= Radial unit hypothesis =

Conceptual theory of cerebral cortex development

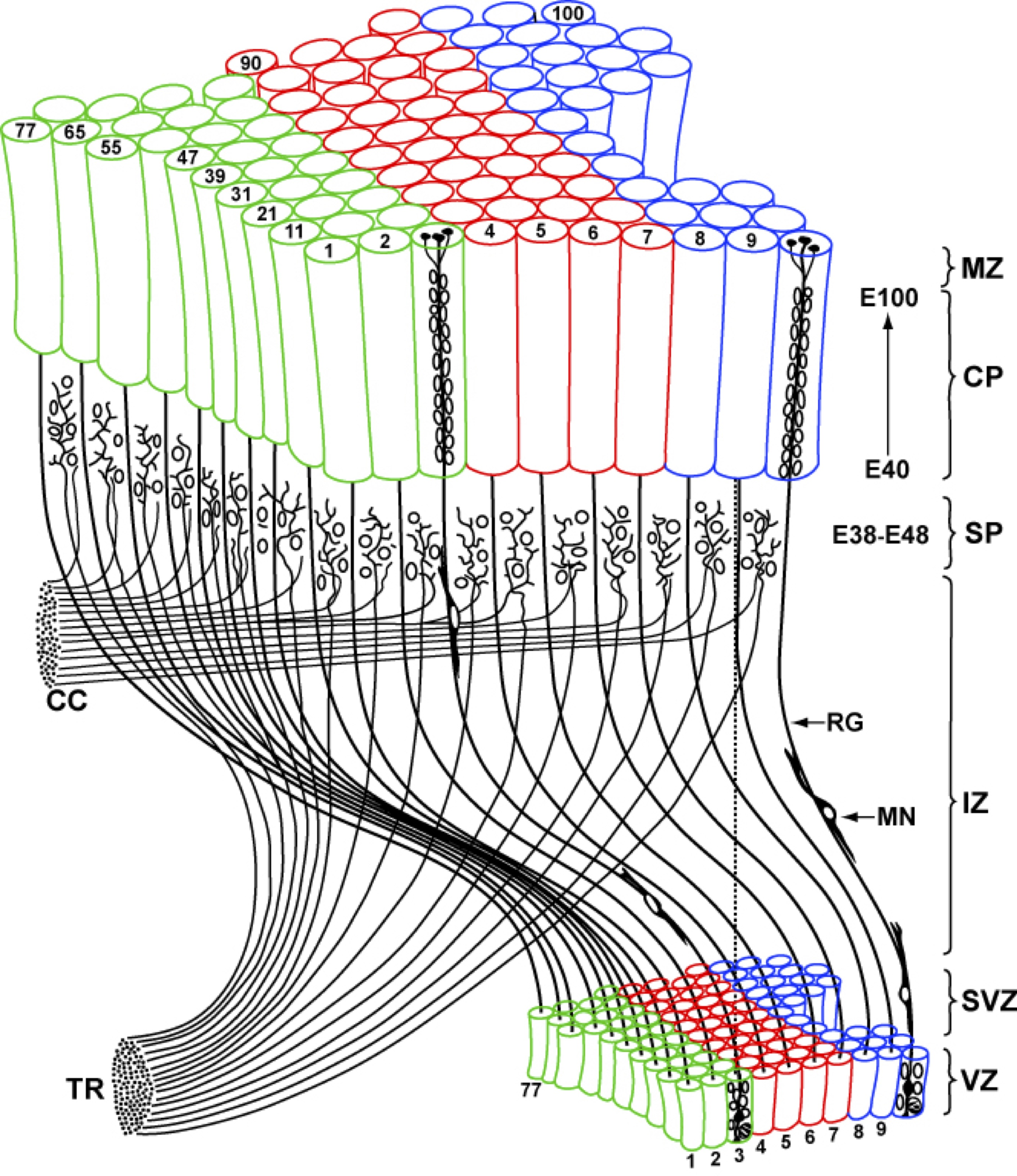
Schematic of the Radial Unit Hypothesis as related to the Protomap Hypothesis (colored regions) of cortical development and evolution. Adapted from Rakic, 1995, 2009. VZ, ventricular zone; SVZ, subventricular zone; IZ, intermediate zone; SP, subplate; CP, cortical plate; MZ, marginal zone; RG, radial glia; MN, migrating neuron; TR, thalamic radiation; CC, cortico-cortical axons. E## represents post-conceptional age of macaque monkey.

The Radial Unit Hypothesis (RUH) is a conceptual theory of cerebral cortex development, first described by Pasko Rakic. It states that the cerebral cortex develops during embryogenesis as an array of interacting cortical columns, or 'radial units', each of which originates from a transient stem cell layer called the ventricular zone, which contains neural stem cells known as radial glial cells.

== Cortical evolution ==
The reiterative nature of the cerebral cortex, in the sense that it is a vast array of repeating functional circuits, led to the idea that cortical evolution is governed by mechanisms regulating the addition of cortical columns, enabling additional functional areas to become specialized and incorporated into the brain. The addition of new radial units is thought to depend on control of the cell cycle (proliferation) of cortical stem cells lining the ventricular system in the ventricular zone and subventricular zone.

== Protomap ==
Intimately related to the RUH is the 'protomap' hypothesis, which states that the primordial identity of each functional area of the cerebral cortex is encoded within the cortical stem cells prior to the formation of the cortical layers. Within each developing radial unit, the process of neurogenesis gives rise to post-mitotic (non-dividing) cortical neurons, which begin the process of radial neuronal migration from the ventricular zone and adjacent subventricular zone to form the cortical plate in the classic 'inside-out' manner beginning with the deep cortical layers. Once their final destination is achieved, cortical neurons begin to form circuits with other cortical and subcortical neurons, often taking on a columnar shape following the radial migration route. Some localized lateral dispersion takes place during cortical column development in the mouse, but the degree of dispersion is molecularly regulated and indeed could vary across species.

== Principles of development ==
Together, the RUH and protomap hypothesis represent two core principles of early cerebral cortex development. After neurons arrive in the cortical plate, other processes—especially activity-dependent processes—govern the maturation of cortical circuitry.

== See also ==
- Neural stem cell
- Stem cell
- Ventricular zone
- Subventricular zone
- Neurogenesis
- Cellular differentiation
- Cortical patterning
- Protomap
- Cortical column
