= Protomap (neuroscience) =

Embryo cerebral cortex mapping

The Protomap is a primordial molecular map of the functional areas of the mammalian cerebral cortex during early embryonic development, at a stage when neural stem cells are still the dominant cell type. The protomap is a feature of the ventricular zone, which contains the principal cortical progenitor cells, known as radial glial cells. Through a process called 'cortical patterning', the protomap is patterned by a system of signaling centers in the embryo, which provide positional information and cell fate instructions. These early genetic instructions set in motion a development and maturation process that gives rise to the mature functional areas of the cortex, for example the visual, somatosensory, and motor areas. The term protomap was coined by Pasko Rakic. The protomap hypothesis was opposed by the protocortex hypothesis, which proposes that cortical proto-areas initially have the same potential, and that regionalization in large part is controlled by external influences, such as axonal inputs from the thalamus to the cortex. However, a series of papers in the year 2000 and in 2001 provided strong evidence against the protocortex hypothesis, and the protomap hypothesis has been well accepted since then. The protomap hypothesis, together with the related radial unit hypothesis, forms our core understanding of the embryonic development of the cerebral cortex. Once the basic structure is present and cortical neurons have migrated to their final destinations, many other processes contribute to the maturation of functional cortical circuits.

== See also ==
- Radial unit hypothesis
- Neural stem cell
- Stem cell
- Neurogenesis
- Cellular differentiation
- Cortical patterning
- Gyrification
