= Protomap =

Protomap may refer to:

- Protomap (neuroscience) - a hypothetical map of the ventricular zone in the brain
- Protomap (proteomics) - a proteomic technique for characterizing proteolytic events using mass spectrometry
