= Laminar organization =

Way certain tissues are arranged in layers

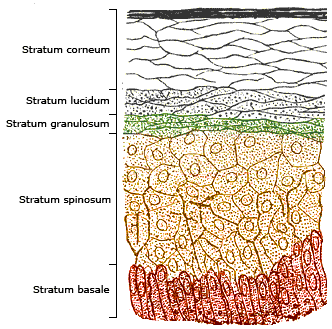
- Organization of epidermal layers in the skin

A laminar organization describes the way certain tissues, such as bone membrane, skin, or brain tissues, are arranged in layers.

== Types ==
=== Embryo ===
The earliest forms of laminar organization are shown in the diploblastic and triploblastic formation of the germ layers in the embryo. In the first week of human embryogenesis two layers of cells have formed, an external epiblast layer (the primitive ectoderm), and an internal hypoblast layer (primitive endoderm). This gives the early bilaminar disc. In the third week in the stage of gastrulation epiblast cells invaginate to form endoderm, and a third layer of cells known as mesoderm. Cells that remain in the epiblast become ectoderm. This is the trilaminar disc and the epiblast cells have given rise to the three germ layers.

=== Brain ===
In the brain a laminar organization is evident in the arrangement of the three meninges, the membranes that cover the brain and spinal cord. These membranes are the dura mater, arachnoid mater, and pia mater. The dura mater has two layers a periosteal layer near to the bone of the skull, and a meningeal layer next to the other meninges.

The cerebral cortex, the outer neural sheet covering the cerebral hemispheres can be described by its laminar organization, due to the arrangement of cortical neurons into six distinct layers.

=== Eye ===
The eye in mammals has an extensive laminar organization. There are three main layers – the outer fibrous tunic, the middle uvea, and the inner retina. These layers have sublayers with the retina having ten ranging from the outer choroid to the inner vitreous humor and including the retinal nerve fiber layer.

=== Skin ===
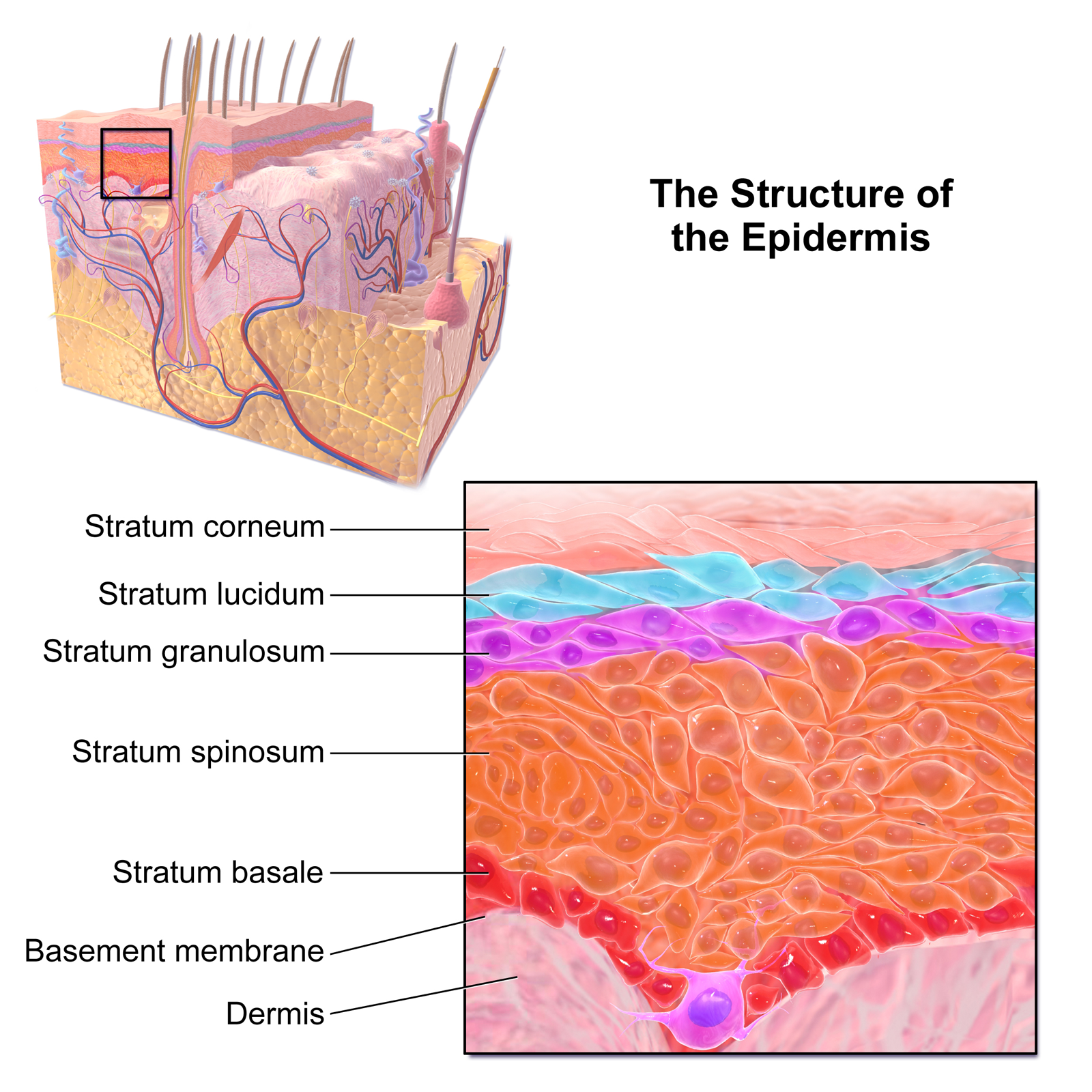
Five epidermal layers shown as various strata

The human skin has a dense laminar organization. The outer epidermis has four or five layers.
