= Pasko Rakic =

Yugoslav-born American neuroscientist (born 1933)

Pasko Rakic ForMemRS
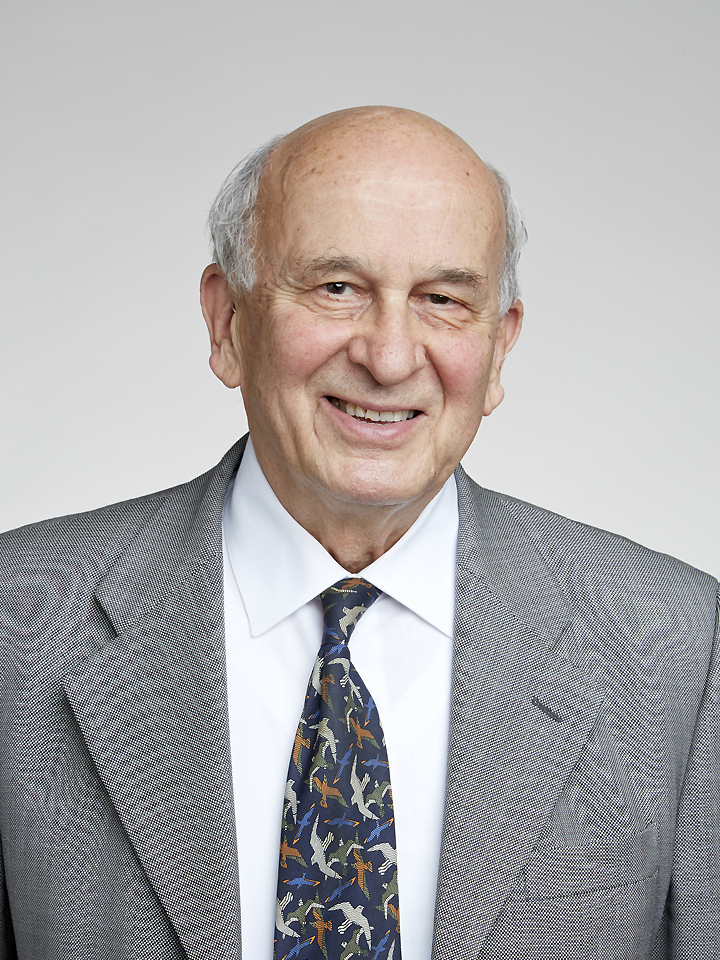
- Rakic in 2016
- Born: May 15, 1933 (age 93); Ruma, Kingdom of Yugoslavia
- Education: University of Belgrade; Harvard University
- Awards: Kavli Prize (2008)
- Scientific career
- Fields: Neuroscience
- Workplaces: Yale University

Pasko Rakic ForMemRS (Croatian: Paško Rakić; Serbian Cyrillic: Пашко Ракић; born May 15, 1933) is a Yugoslav-born American neuroscientist, who currently works in the Yale School of Medicine Department of Neuroscience in New Haven, Connecticut. His main research interest is in the development and evolution of the human brain. He was the founder and served as Chairman of the Department of Neurobiology at Yale, and was founder and Director of the Kavli Institute for Neuroscience. He is best known for elucidating the mechanisms involved in development and evolution of the cerebral cortex. In 2008, Rakic shared the inaugural Kavli Prize in Neuroscience. He is currently the Dorys McConell Duberg Professor of Neuroscience, leads an active research laboratory, and serves on Advisory Boards and Scientific Councils of a number of Institutions and Research Foundations.

== Early life and education ==
Rakic was born on May 15, 1933, in Ruma (formerly Kingdom of Yugoslavia). His father, Toma Rakić, was Croatian, originally from Pula (Istria, at that time part of Italy), but emigrated to Yugoslavia, where in the town of Novi Sad (Bačka) he studied to become an accountant and tax official. His mother, Juliana Todorić, of Serbian and Slovak descent was born in Dubrovnik (Dalmatia) and moved to Ruma, where they met and got married in 1929.

Due to the nature of his father's job as Director of Regional Tax Services, the family moved to different towns every few years. Finally, their daughter, Vera, and son, Pasko, completed Gimnasium (High School) in the town of Sremska Mitrovica. Vera eventually graduated in mathematics from Belgrade University, and Pasko obtained his medical degree (MD) from the University of Belgrade School of Medicine, where he embarked on a career as a neurosurgeon.

His research career began in 1962, with a Fulbright Fellowship at Harvard University in Boston, MA, where he met professor Paul Yakovlev, who introduced him to the joy of studying human brain development, which inspired him to abandon neurosurgery. In 1966, he returned to Belgrade and obtained his graduate degree in Developmental Biology and Genetics in 1969. During work on his doctoral thesis, Rakic made his first significant discovery that was internationally recognized.

He then accepted a faculty position at Harvard Medical School, where he worked and taught for eight years.

== Later career ==
In 1978, Rakic was recruited by George Palade to join the faculty of Yale University, where he founded and served as Chair of the Department of Neurobiology and the director of the Kavli Institute for Neuroscience. He was also president of the Society for Neuroscience from 1995 to 1996.

In 2015, he returned to work full-time on his research projects, funded by US Public Health Services and various private foundations. That same year, he delivered the inaugural address for the Irene Jakob Memorial Lecture series, which was established at the University of Pittsburgh in honor of the late Irene Jakab, a psychiatrist and humanist who had achieved prominence for her use of art therapy in the diagnosis and treatment of learning disabilities and mental illness.

== Research ==
Rakic is known for his studies of the development and evolution of the brain. More specifically, he has discovered and formulated basic cellular and molecular mechanisms of proliferation and migration of neurons in the cerebral cortex, the brain's outer layer, which plays a key role in cognition and human exceptional mental capacities.

According to Nature Medicine, his first experiments at Harvard required an especially large research grant, that enabled exposure of non-human primate rhesus monkeys to so much radioactive thymidine that manufacturers had to retool their entire production system to provide it. Rakic injected the monkeys' fetuses with radioactive thymidine at a particular time after conception. Only replicating cells took up the radioactive label, which enabled Rakic to trace the lineages of brain cells as they were created. He and his team then sliced the brain of each monkey into 7,000 sections, which were stored in Rakic's collection for the benefit of future researchers. Because he used a radiolabel that decays slowly, the slides should be useful for years, and have so far led to more than 24 papers. This material has also provided evidence that contributed one of the significant tenets of Neuroscience, that neurons of the cerebral cortex last for the entire lifespan and are irreplaceable. This and other material, such as tissue from monkeys of different age, are available in MacBrainResource.

Rakic discovered the early commitment of newborn neurons to their laminar, radial and areal fates and proposed differential cell adhesion as the basic mechanism for their surface-mediating migration along transient radial glial scaffolding. These studies led him to postulate the "radial unit hypothesis" and "protomap" hypotheses of cortical development and evolution that provide the framework for understanding basic principles of normal and pathological development of the human brain. These concepts were further elaborated in his paper published in the journal Neuron in 2013.

Rakic also provided direct cellular evidence for the competitive interactions among binocular visual connections before birth, and showed that axons, synapses and neurotransmitter receptors are overproduced before declining to the adult levels by a process of competitive selective elimination.

Rakic is also known for failing to identify adult neurogenesis in the primate cerebral cortex.

== Honors and awards ==
- Grass Foundation Award, 1985
- Karl Spencer Lashley Award, American Philosophical Society, 1986
- Francois I Medal, College de France, 1986
- Kreig Cortical Discoverer Award, 1989
- Marta Philipson Award, Stockholm 2000
- Pasarow Foundation Award, 2001
- Fyssen International Science Prize, 1992
- F.O. Schmitt Medal, 1992
- Weinstein-Goldenson Award (United Cerebral Palsy Foundation) 1994;
- Henry Gray Award, AAA, 1996
- Bristol-Myers Squibb Award, 2002
- Gerard Prize, SFN, 2002
- Inaugural Kavli Neuroscience Prize shared with T. Jessell & S. Grillner (2008)
- Krieg Lifetime Achievement Award shared with Paul Allen, 2010
- Max Cowan Award, 2013
- Sandy Palay Award, 2014
- Child Mind Institute Award, NYC, 2014
- Becker Award "Gesellschaft fuer Neuropaediatrie" 2014
- Royal Academy of Medicine (Spain), 2018
- Royal Academy of London (UK), 2018

== Personal ==
He is married to Sandra Biller. Previously, he was married to Patricia Goldman-Rakic (née Shoer), also a pioneering neuroscientist, who died on July 31, 2003.
