= Trilaminar embryonic disc =

Details

Identifiers
- Latin: blastodiscus trilaminaris
- TE: embryonic disc_by_E6.0.1.1.4.0.1 E6.0.1.1.4.0.1

A trilaminar embryonic disc, trilaminary blastoderm, or trilaminar germ disk is an early stage in the development of triploblastic organisms, which include humans and many other animals. It is the next stage from the earlier bilaminar embryonic disc.

It is an embryo which exists as three different germ layers – the ectoderm, the mesoderm and the endoderm. These layers are arranged on top of each other, giving rise to the name trilaminar, or "three-layered". The mesoderm is segmented further into the paraxial, intermediate and the lateral plate mesoderm.

These three layers arise early in the third week (during gastrulation) from the epiblast (a portion of the mammalian inner cell mass).
