= Ventricular zone =

Transient embryonic layer of tissue containing neural stem cells

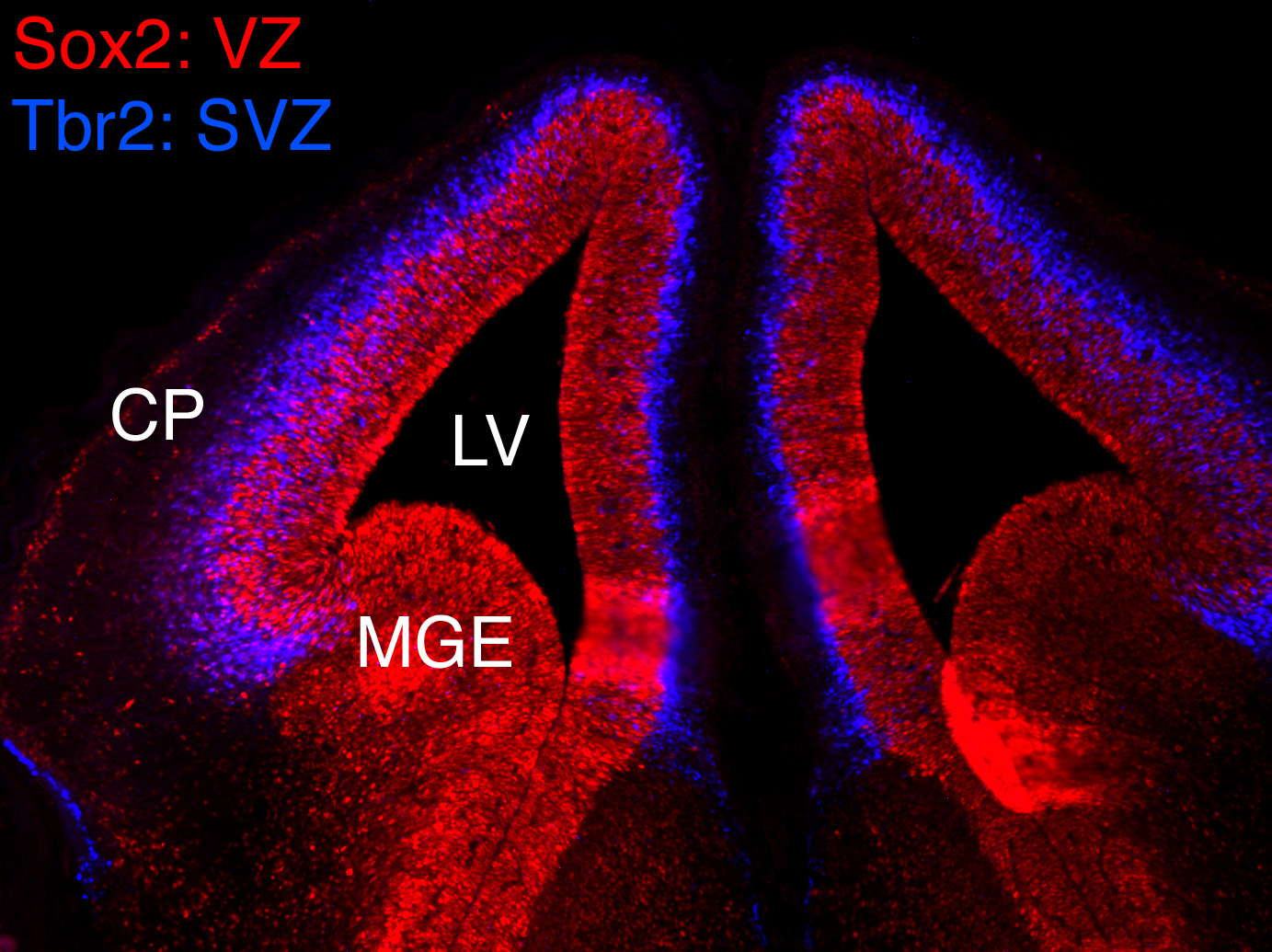
The VZ and SVZ are indicated by immunohistochemical labelling of Sox2 and Tbr2 gene expression in the embryonic mouse forebrain at embryonic day 13.5. The dorsal telencephalon becomes the cerebral cortex, and contains the Tbr2-labeled cells. CP, cortical plate; LV, lateral ventricle; MGE, medial ganglionic eminence

In vertebrates, the ventricular zone (VZ) is a transient embryonic layer of tissue containing neural stem cells, principally radial glial cells, of the central nervous system (CNS). The VZ is so named because it lines the ventricular system, which contains cerebrospinal fluid (CSF). The embryonic ventricular system contains growth factors and other nutrients needed for the proper function of neural stem cells. Neurogenesis, or the generation of neurons, occurs in the VZ during embryonic and fetal development as a function of the Notch pathway, and the newborn neurons must migrate substantial distances to their final destination in the developing brain or spinal cord where they will establish neural circuits. A secondary proliferative zone, the subventricular zone (SVZ), lies adjacent to the VZ. In the embryonic cerebral cortex, the SVZ contains intermediate neuronal progenitors that continue to divide into post-mitotic neurons. Through the process of neurogenesis, the parent neural stem cell pool is depleted and the VZ disappears. The balance between the rates of stem cell proliferation and neurogenesis changes during development, and species from mouse to human show large differences in the number of cell cycles, cell cycle length, and other parameters, which is thought to give rise to the large diversity in brain size and structure.

Epigenetic DNA modifications appear to have a central role in regulating gene expression during differentiation of neural stem cells. One type of epigenetic modification occurring in the VZ is the formation of DNA 5-Methylcytosine from cytosine by DNA methyltransferases. Another important type of epigenetic modification is the demethylation of 5mC, catalyzed in several steps by TET enzymes and enzymes of the base excision repair pathway.

== See also ==
- Cortical patterning
- Protomap
- Microcephaly
