= Cerebral cortex =

Outer layer of the cerebrum of the mammalian brain

- The sulci and gyri (folds and ridges) of the cortex

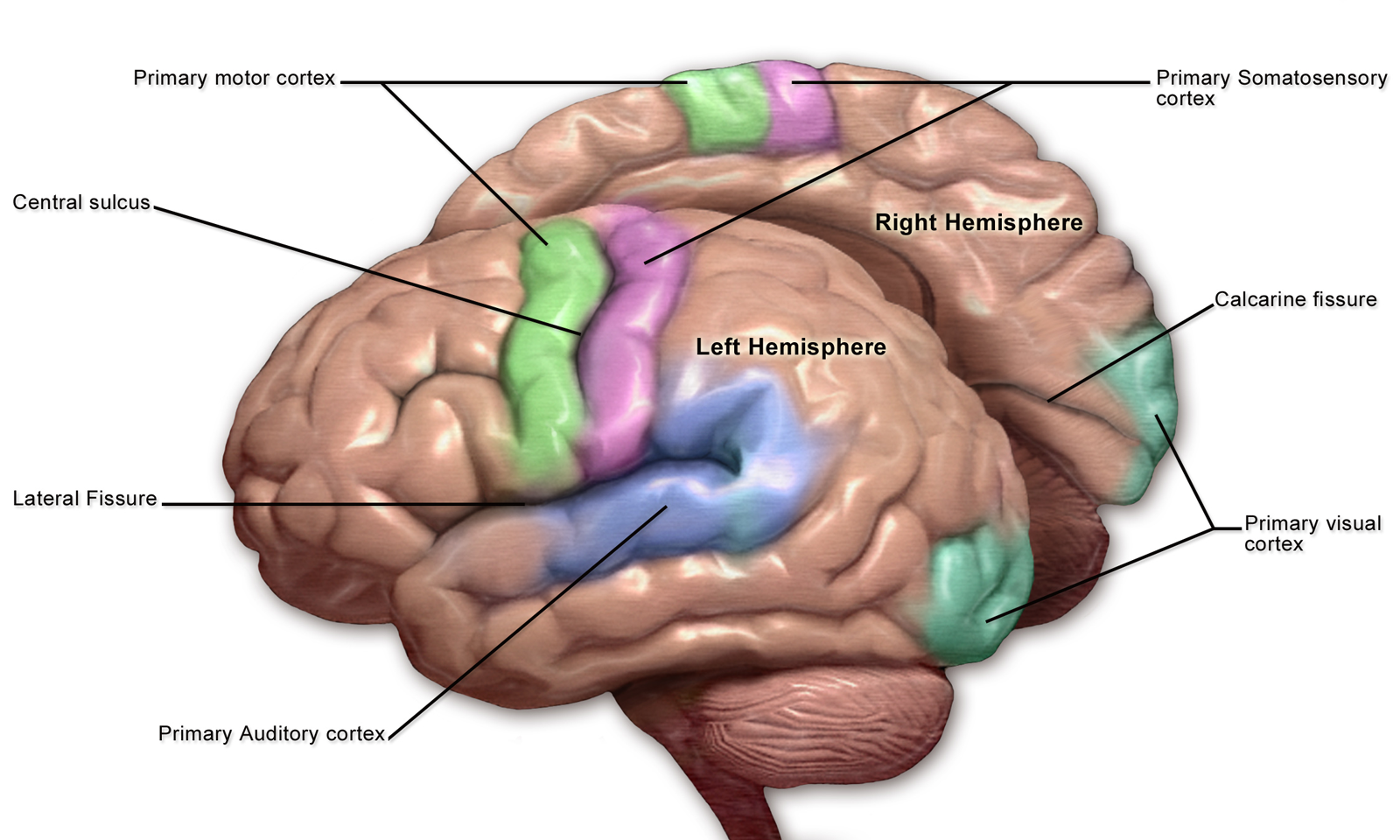
- Motor and sensory areas of the cerebral cortex

Details
- Part of: Cerebrum

Identifiers
- Latin: cortex cerebri
- MeSH: D002540
- NeuroNames: 39
- NeuroLex ID: birnlex_1494
- TA98: A14.1.09.003; A14.1.09.301
- TA2: 5527, 5528
- FMA: 61830

The cerebral cortex, also known as the cerebral mantle, is the outer layer of neural tissue of the cerebrum of the brain in humans and other mammals. It is the largest site of neural integration in the central nervous system, and plays a key role in attention, perception, awareness, thought, memory, language, and consciousness.

The six-layered neocortex makes up approximately 90% of the cortex, with the allocortex making up the remainder. The cortex is divided into left and right parts by the longitudinal fissure, which separates the two cerebral hemispheres that are joined beneath the cortex by the corpus callosum and other commissural fibers. In most mammals, the cerebral cortex is folded, providing a greater surface area in the confined volume of the cranium. Apart from minimising brain and cranial volume, cortical folding is crucial for the brain circuitry and its functional organisation. In mammals with small brains, there is no folding and the cortex is smooth.

A fold or ridge in the cortex is termed a gyrus (plural gyri) and a groove is termed a sulcus (plural sulci). These surface convolutions appear during fetal development and continue to mature after birth through the process of gyrification. In the human brain, the majority of the cerebral cortex is not visible from the outside, but buried in the sulci. The major sulci and gyri mark the divisions of the cerebrum into the lobes of the brain. The four major lobes are the frontal, parietal, occipital and temporal lobes. Other lobes are the limbic lobe, and the insular cortex often referred to as the insular lobe.

There are between 14 and 16 billion neurons in the human cerebral cortex. These are organised into horizontal cortical layers, and radially into cortical columns and minicolumns. Cortical areas have specific functions such as movement in the motor cortex, and sight in the visual cortex. The motor cortex is primarily located in the precentral gyrus, and the visual cortex is located in the occipital lobe.

== Structure ==
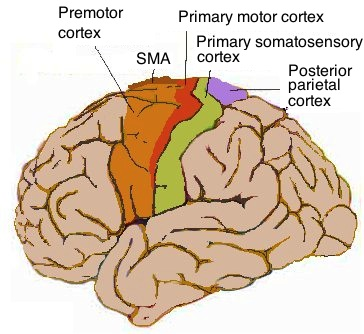
Lateral view of cerebrum showing several cortices

The cerebral cortex is the outer covering of the surfaces of the cerebral hemispheres and is folded into peaks called gyri, and grooves called sulci. In the human brain, it is between 2 and 3–4 mm. thick, and makes up 40% of the brain's mass. 90% of the cerebral cortex is the six-layered neocortex whilst the other 10% is made up of the three/four-layered allocortex. There are between 14 and 16 billion neurons in the cortex. These cortical neurons are organized radially in cortical columns, and minicolumns, in the horizontally organized layers of the cortex.

The neocortex is separable into different regions of cortex known in the plural as cortices, and include the motor cortex and visual cortex. About two thirds of the cortical surface is buried in the sulci and the insular cortex is completely hidden. The cortex is thickest over the top of a gyrus and thinnest at the bottom of a sulcus.

=== Folds ===
The cerebral cortex is folded in a way that allows a large surface area of neural tissue to fit within the confines of the neurocranium. When unfolded in the human, each hemispheric cortex has a total surface area of about 0.12 square metres (1.3 sq ft). The folding is inward away from the surface of the brain, and is also present on the medial surface of each hemisphere within the longitudinal fissure. Most mammals have a cerebral cortex that is convoluted with the peaks known as gyri and the troughs or grooves known as sulci. Some small mammals including some small rodents have smooth cerebral surfaces without gyrification.

=== Lobes ===
The larger sulci and gyri mark the divisions of the cortex of the cerebrum into the lobes of the brain. There are four main lobes: the frontal lobe, parietal lobe, temporal lobe, and occipital lobe. The insular cortex is often included as the insular lobe. The limbic lobe is a rim of cortex on the medial side of each hemisphere and is also often included. There are also three lobules of the brain described: the paracentral lobule, the superior parietal lobule, and the inferior parietal lobule.

=== Thickness ===
For species of mammals, larger brains (in absolute terms, not just in relation to body size) tend to have thicker cortices. The smallest mammals, such as shrews, have a neocortical thickness of about 0.5 mm; the ones with the largest brains, such as humans and fin whales, have thicknesses of 2–4 mm. There is an approximately logarithmic relationship between brain weight and cortical thickness. Magnetic resonance imaging of the brain (MRI) makes it possible to get a measure for the thickness of the human cerebral cortex and relate it to other measures. The thickness of different cortical areas varies but in general, sensory cortex is thinner than motor cortex. One study has found some positive association between the cortical thickness and intelligence. Another study has found that the somatosensory cortex is thicker in migraine patients, though it is not known if this is the result of migraine attacks, the cause of them or if both are the result of a shared cause. A later study using a larger patient population reports no change in the cortical thickness in patients with migraine. A genetic disorder of the cerebral cortex, whereby decreased folding in certain areas results in a microgyrus, where there are four layers instead of six, is in some instances seen to be related to dyslexia.

=== Layers of neocortex ===
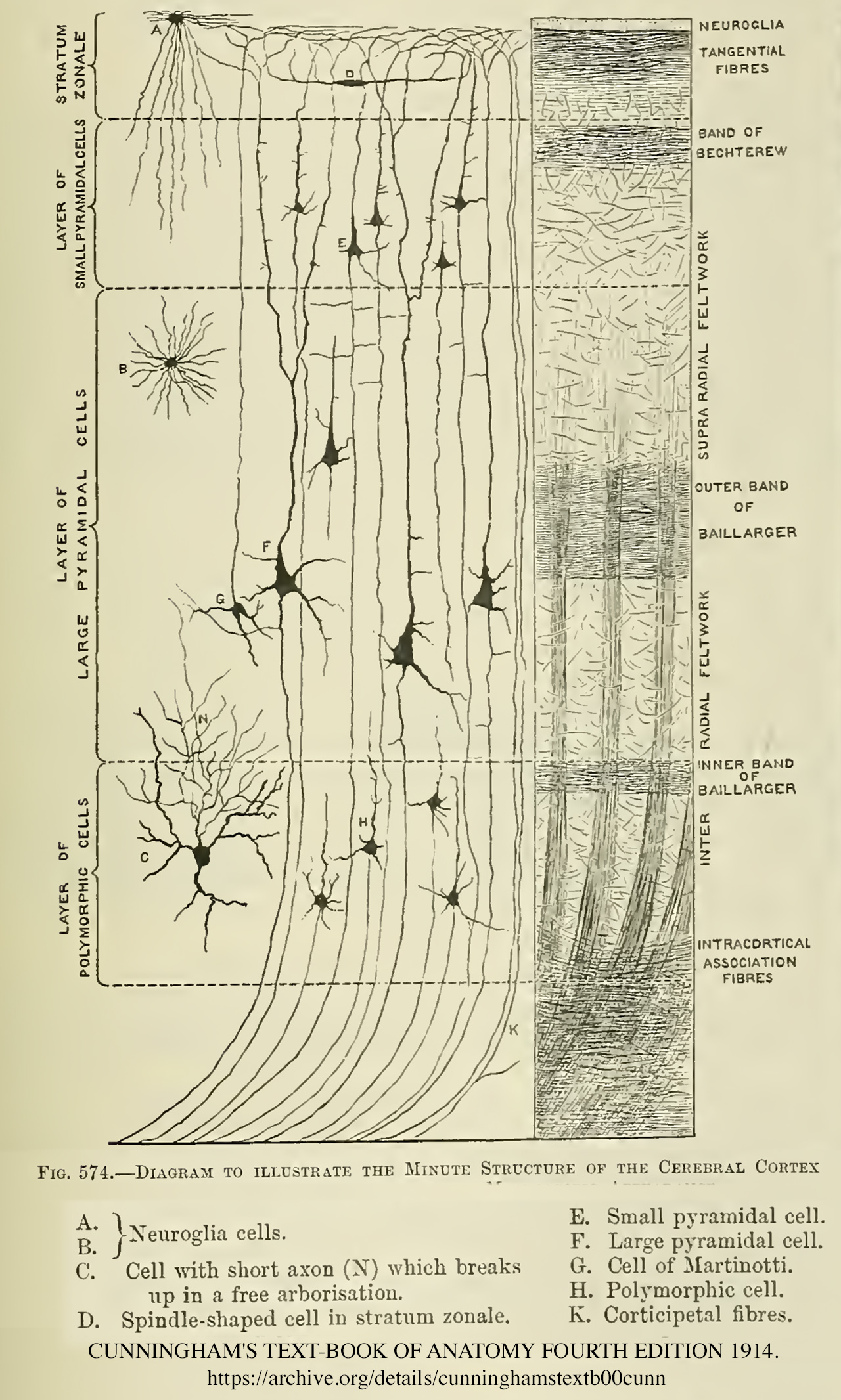
Diagram of layers pattern. Cells grouped on left, axonal layers on right.

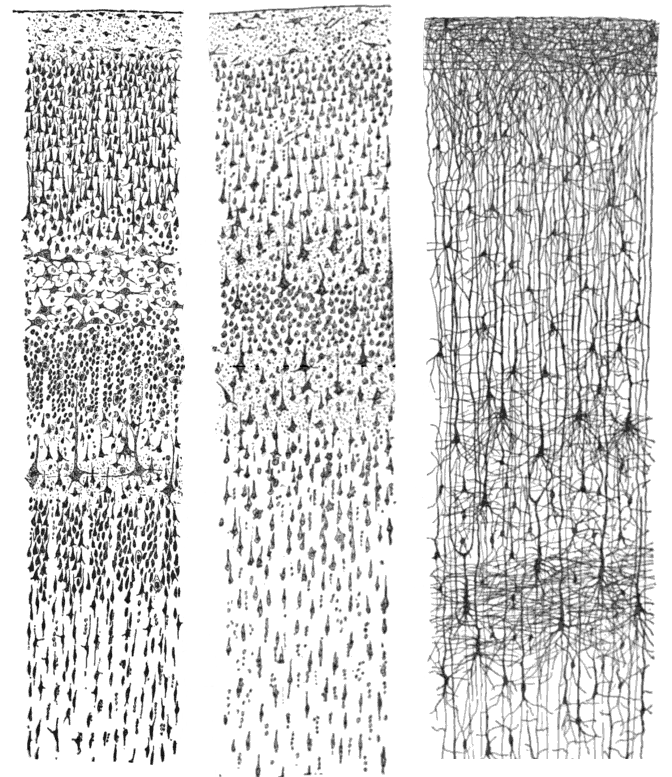
Three drawings of cortical lamination by Santiago Ramon y Cajal, each showing a vertical cross-section, with the surface of the cortex at the top. Left: Nissl-stained visual cortex of a human adult. Middle: Nissl-stained motor cortex of a human adult. Right: Golgi-stained cortex of a 1 1/2 month-old infant. The Nissl stain shows the cell bodies of neurons; the Golgi stain shows the dendrites and axons of a random subset of neurons.

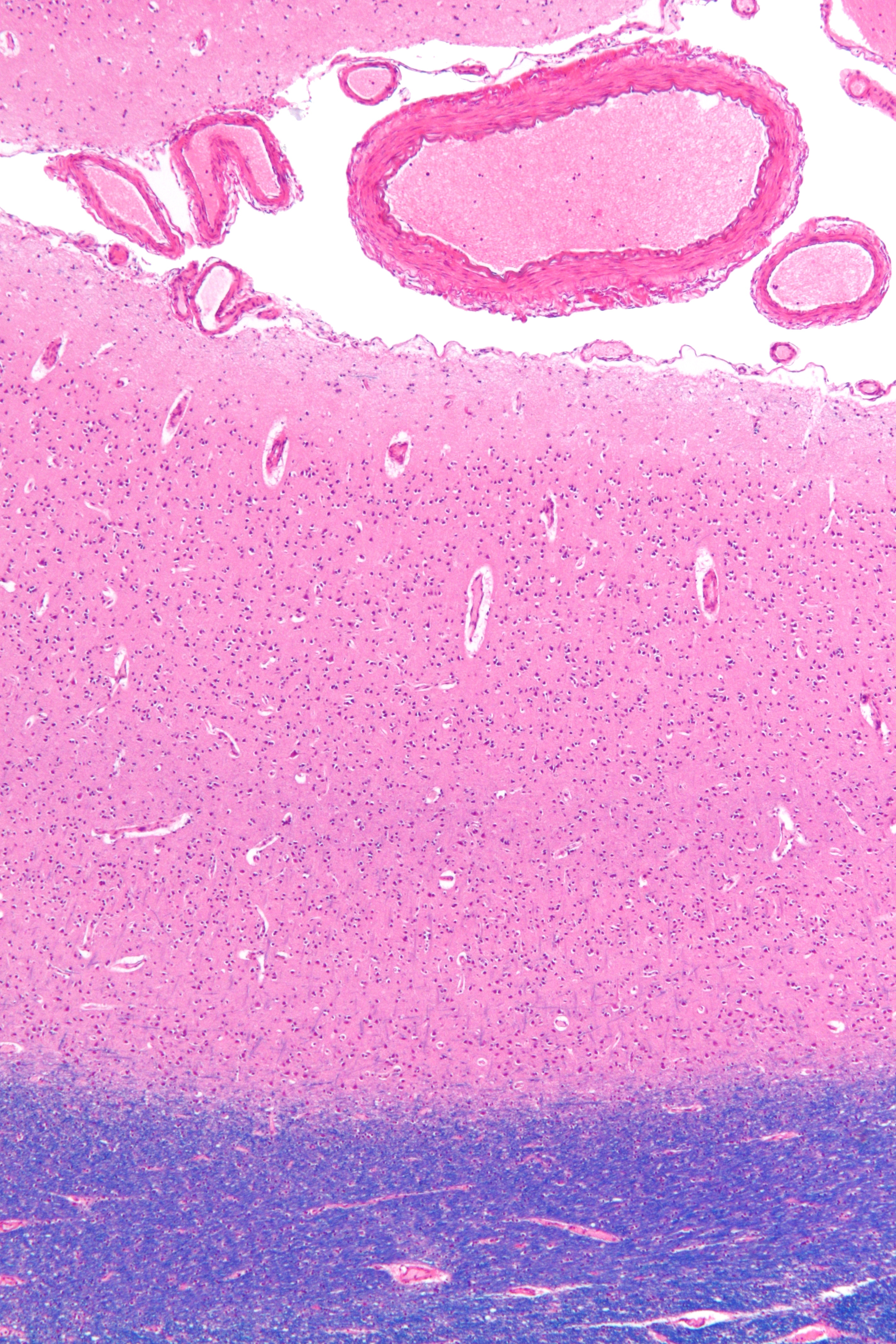
Micrograph showing the visual cortex (predominantly pink). Subcortical white matter (predominantly blue) is seen at the bottom of the image. HE-LFB stain.

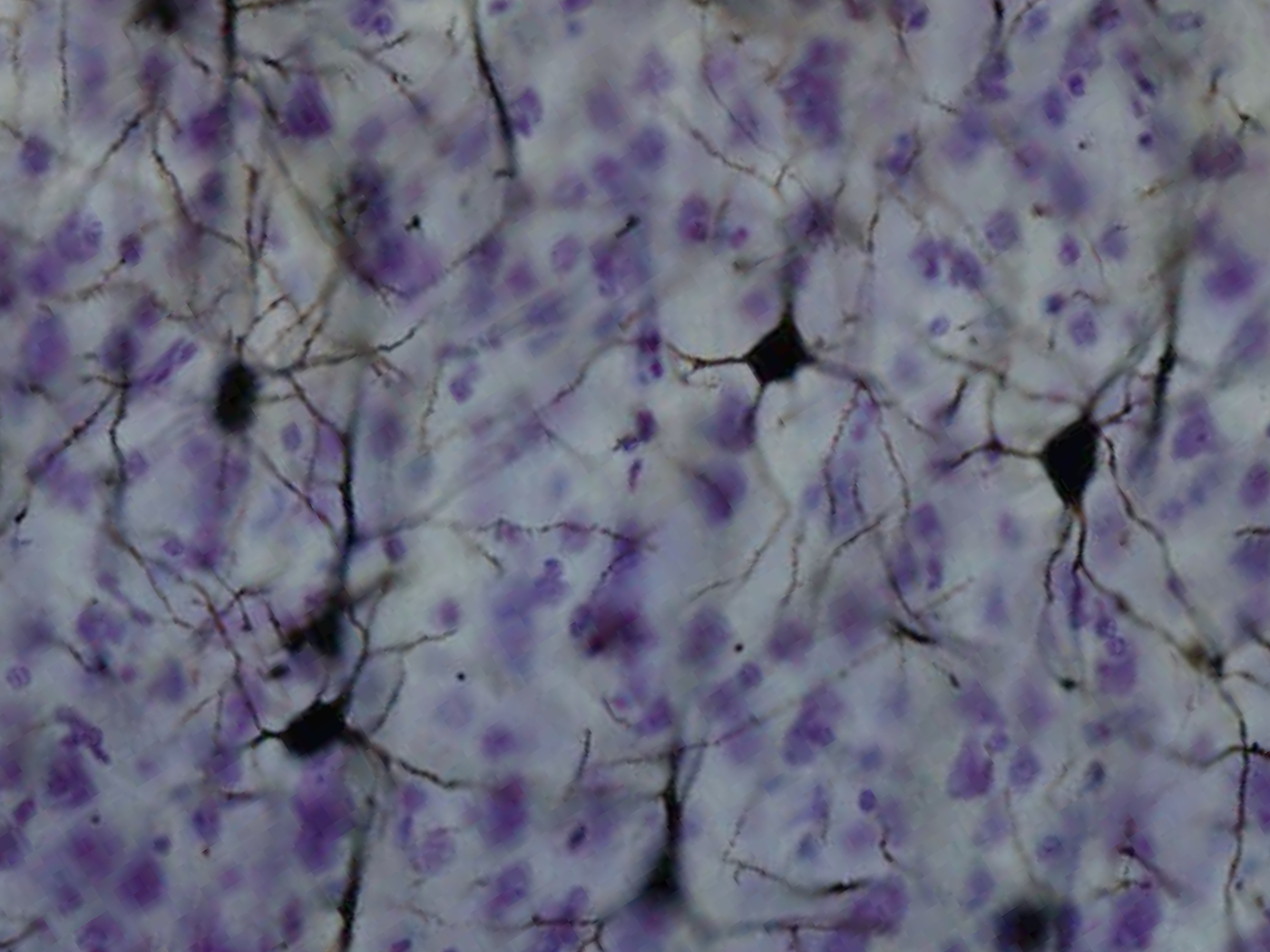
Golgi-stained neurons in the cortex (macaque)

The neocortex is formed of six layers, numbered I to VI, from the outermost layer I – near to the pia mater, to the innermost layer VI – near to the underlying white matter. Each cortical layer has a characteristic distribution of different neurons and their connections with other cortical and subcortical regions. For instance, the primary motor cortex is almost devoid of granule cells (layer IV), because of the lack of inputs to this layer. There are direct connections between different cortical areas and indirect connections via the thalamus.

One of the clearest examples of cortical layering is the line of Gennari in the primary visual cortex. This is a band of whiter tissue that can be observed with the naked eye in the calcarine sulcus of the occipital lobe. The line of Gennari is composed of axons bringing visual information from the thalamus into layer IV of the visual cortex.

Staining cross-sections of the cortex to reveal the position of neuronal cell bodies and the intracortical axon tracts allowed neuroanatomists in the early 20th century to produce a detailed description of the laminar structure of the cortex in different species. The work of Korbinian Brodmann (1909) established that the mammalian neocortex is consistently divided into six layers.

==== Layer I ====
Layer I is the molecular layer, and contains few scattered neurons, including GABAergic rosehip neurons. Layer I consists largely of extensions of apical dendritic tufts of pyramidal neurons and horizontally oriented axons, as well as glial cells. During development, Cajal–Retzius cells and subpial granular layer cells are present in this layer. Also, some spiny stellate cells can be found here. Inputs to the apical tufts are thought to be crucial for the feedback interactions in the cerebral cortex involved in associative learning and attention.

While it was once thought that the input to layer I came from the cortex itself, it is now known that layer I across the cerebral cortex receives substantial input from matrix or M-type thalamus cells, as opposed to core or C-type that go to layer IV.

It is thought that layer I serves as a central hub for collecting and processing widespread information. It integrates ascending sensory inputs with top-down expectations, regulating how sensory perceptions align with anticipated outcomes. Further, layer I sorts, directs, and combines excitatory inputs, integrating them with neuromodulatory signals. Inhibitory interneurons, both within layer I and from other cortical layers, gate these signals. Together, these interactions dynamically calibrate information flow throughout the neocortex, shaping perceptions and experiences.

==== Layer II ====
Layer II, the external granular layer, contains small pyramidal neurons and numerous stellate neurons.

==== Layer III ====
Layer III, the external pyramidal layer, contains predominantly small and medium-size pyramidal neurons, as well as non-pyramidal neurons with vertically oriented intracortical axons; layers I through III are the main target of commissural corticocortical afferents, and layer III is the principal source of corticocortical efferents.

==== Layer IV ====
Layer IV, the internal granular layer, contains different types of stellate and pyramidal cells, and is the main target of thalamocortical afferents from thalamus type C neurons (core-type) as well as intra-hemispheric corticocortical afferents. The layers above layer IV are also referred to as supragranular layers (layers I-III), whereas the layers below are referred to as infragranular layers (layers V and VI). African elephants, cetaceans, and hippopotamus do not have a layer IV with axons which would terminate there going instead to the inner part of layer III.

==== Layer V ====
Layer V, the internal pyramidal layer, contains large pyramidal neurons. Axons from these leave the cortex and connect with subcortical structures including the basal ganglia. In the primary motor cortex of the frontal lobe, layer V contains giant pyramidal cells called Betz cells, whose axons travel through the internal capsule, the brain stem, and the spinal cord forming the corticospinal tract, which is the main pathway for voluntary motor control.

==== Layer VI ====
Layer VI, the polymorphic layer or multiform layer, contains few large pyramidal neurons and many small spindle-like pyramidal and multiform neurons; layer VI sends efferent fibers to the thalamus, establishing a very precise reciprocal interconnection between the cortex and the thalamus. That is, layer VI neurons from one cortical column connect with thalamus neurons that provide input to the same cortical column. These connections are both excitatory and inhibitory. Neurons send excitatory fibers to neurons in the thalamus and also send collaterals to the thalamic reticular nucleus that inhibit these same thalamus neurons or ones adjacent to them. One theory is that because the inhibitory output is reduced by cholinergic input to the cerebral cortex, this provides the brainstem with adjustable "gain control for the relay of lemniscal inputs".

=== Columns ===
The cortical layers are not simply stacked one over the other; there exist characteristic connections between different layers and neuronal types, which span all the thickness of the cortex. These cortical microcircuits are grouped into cortical columns and minicolumns. It has been proposed that the minicolumns are the basic functional units of the cortex. In 1957, Vernon Mountcastle showed that the functional properties of the cortex change abruptly between laterally adjacent points; however, they are continuous in the direction perpendicular to the surface. Later works have provided evidence of the presence of functionally distinct cortical columns in the visual cortex (Hubel and Wiesel, 1959), auditory cortex, and associative cortex.

Cortical areas that lack a layer IV are called agranular. Cortical areas that have only a rudimentary layer IV are called dysgranular. Information processing within each layer is determined by different temporal dynamics with that in layers II/III having a slow 2 Hz oscillation while that in layer V has a fast 10–15 Hz oscillation.

=== Types of cortex ===
Based on the differences in laminar organization the cerebral cortex can be classified into two types, the large area of neocortex which has six cell layers, and the much smaller area of allocortex that has three or four layers:

- The neocortex is also known as the isocortex or neopallium and is the part of the mature cerebral cortex with six distinct layers. Examples of neocortical areas include the granular primary motor cortex, and the striate primary visual cortex. The neocortex has two subtypes, the true isocortex and the proisocortex which is a transitional region between the isocortex and the regions of the periallocortex.
- The allocortex is the part of the cerebral cortex with three or four layers, and has three subtypes, the paleocortex with three cortical laminae, the archicortex which has four or five, and a transitional area adjacent to the allocortex, the periallocortex. Examples of allocortex are the olfactory cortex and the hippocampus.

There is a transitional area between the neocortex and the allocortex called the paralimbic cortex, where layers 2, 3 and 4 are merged. This area incorporates the proisocortex of the neocortex and the periallocortex of the allocortex. In addition, the cerebral cortex may be classified into four lobes: the frontal lobe, temporal lobe, the parietal lobe, and the occipital lobe, named from their overlying bones of the skull.

== Blood supply and drainage ==
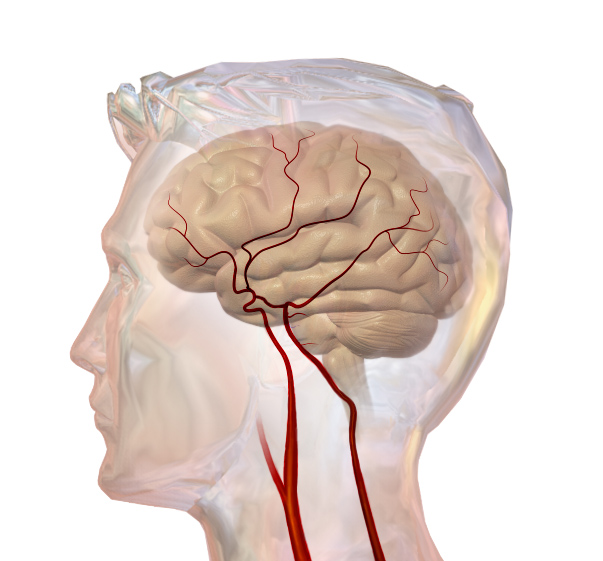
Arterial supply showing the regions supplied by the posterior, middle, and anterior cerebral arteries.

Blood supply to the cerebral cortex is part of the cerebral circulation. Cerebral arteries supply the blood that perfuses the cerebrum. This arterial blood carries oxygen, glucose, and other nutrients to the cortex. Cerebral veins drain the deoxygenated blood, and metabolic wastes including carbon dioxide, back to the heart.

The main arteries supplying the cortex are the anterior cerebral artery, the middle cerebral artery, and the posterior cerebral artery. The anterior cerebral artery supplies the anterior portions of the brain, including most of the frontal lobe. The middle cerebral artery supplies the parietal lobes, temporal lobes, and parts of the occipital lobes. The middle cerebral artery splits into two branches to supply the left and right hemisphere, where they branch further. The posterior cerebral artery supplies the occipital lobes.

The circle of Willis is the main blood system that deals with blood supply in the cerebrum and cerebral cortex.

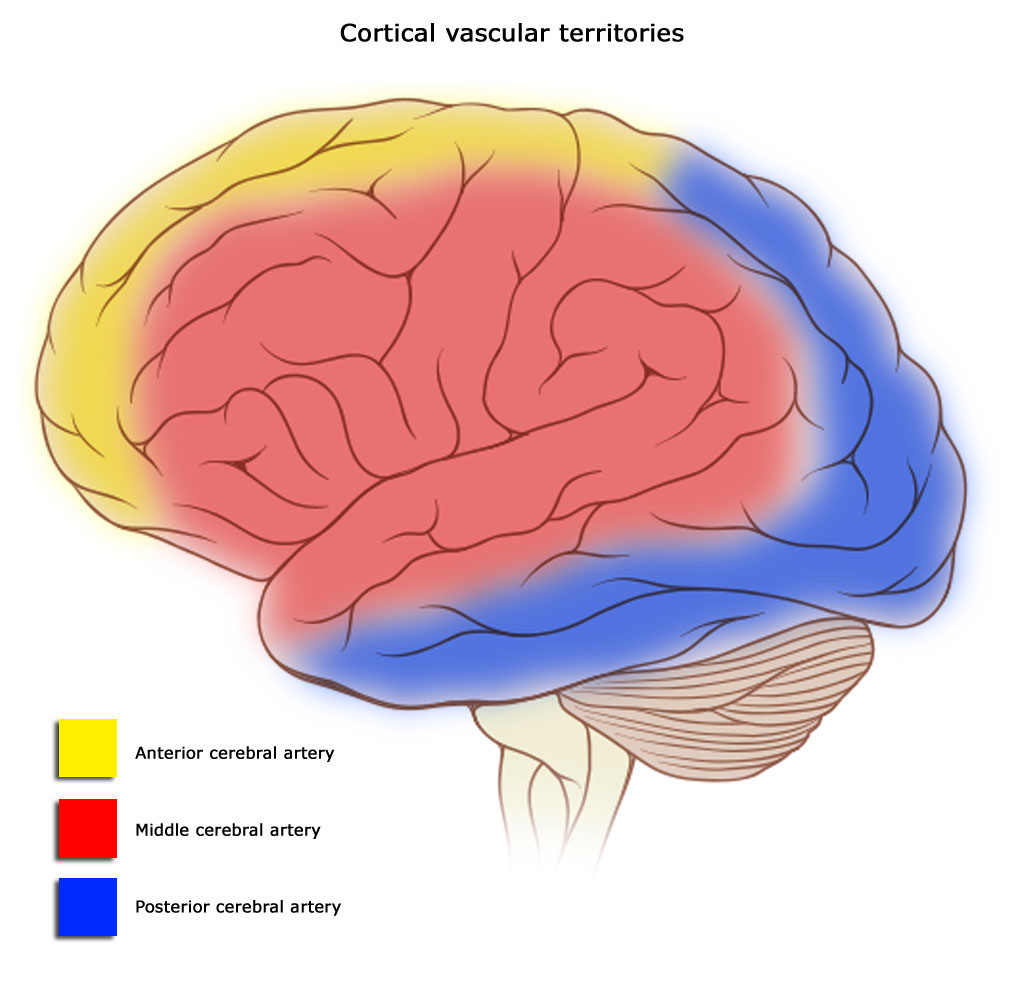
Cortical blood supply

== Development ==
The prenatal development of the cerebral cortex is a complex and finely tuned process called corticogenesis, influenced by the interplay between genes and the environment.

=== Neural tube ===
The cerebral cortex develops from the most anterior part, the forebrain region, of the neural tube. The neural plate folds and closes to form the neural tube. From the cavity inside the neural tube develops the ventricular system, and, from the neuroepithelial cells of its walls, the neurons and glia of the nervous system. The most anterior (front, or cranial) part of the neural plate, the prosencephalon, which is evident before neurulation begins, gives rise to the cerebral hemispheres and later cortex.

=== Cortical neuron development ===
Cortical neurons are generated within the ventricular zone, next to the ventricles. At first, this zone contains neural stem cells, that transition to radial glial cells–progenitor cells, which divide to produce glial cells and neurons.

==== Radial glia ====
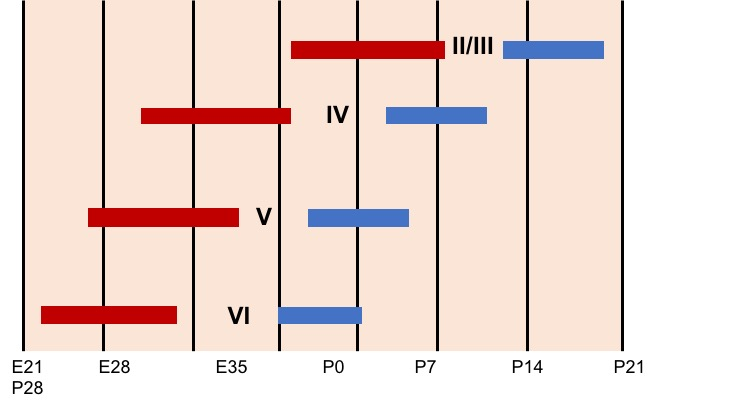
Neurogenesis is shown in red and lamination is shown in blue. Adapted from (Sur et al. 2001)

The cerebral cortex is composed of a heterogenous population of cells that give rise to different cell types. The majority of these cells are derived from radial glia migration that form the different cell types of the neocortex and it is a period associated with an increase in neurogenesis. Similarly, the process of neurogenesis regulates lamination to form the different layers of the cortex. During this process there is an increase in the restriction of cell fate that begins with earlier progenitors giving rise to any cell type in the cortex and later progenitors giving rise only to neurons of superficial layers. This differential cell fate creates an inside-out topography in the cortex with younger neurons in superficial layers and older neurons in deeper layers. In addition, laminar neurons are stopped in S or G2 phase in order to give a fine distinction between the different cortical layers. Laminar differentiation is not fully complete until after birth since during development laminar neurons are still sensitive to extrinsic signals and environmental cues.

Although the majority of the cells that compose the cortex are derived locally from radial glia there is a subset population of neurons that migrate from other regions. Radial glia give rise to neurons that are pyramidal in shape and use glutamate as a neurotransmitter, however these migrating cells contribute neurons that are stellate-shaped and use GABA as their main neurotransmitter. These GABAergic neurons are generated by progenitor cells in the medial ganglionic eminence (MGE) that migrate tangentially to the cortex via the subventricular zone. This migration of GABAergic neurons is particularly important since GABA receptors are excitatory during development. This excitation is primarily driven by the flux of chloride ions through the GABA receptor, however in adults chloride concentrations shift causing an inward flux of chloride that hyperpolarizes postsynaptic neurons. The glial fibers produced in the first divisions of the progenitor cells are radially oriented, spanning the thickness of the cortex from the ventricular zone to the outer, pial surface, and provide scaffolding for the migration of neurons outwards from the ventricular zone.

At birth there are very few dendrites present on the cortical neuron's cell body, and the axon is undeveloped. During the first year of life the dendrites become dramatically increased in number, such that they can accommodate up to a hundred thousand synaptic connections with other neurons. The axon can develop to extend a long way from the cell body.

=== Asymmetric division ===
The first divisions of the progenitor cells are symmetric, which duplicates the total number of progenitor cells at each mitotic cycle. Then, some progenitor cells begin to divide asymmetrically, producing one postmitotic cell that migrates along the radial glial fibers, leaving the ventricular zone, and one progenitor cell, which continues to divide until the end of development, when it differentiates into a glial cell or an ependymal cell. As the G1 phase of mitosis is elongated, in what is seen as selective cell-cycle lengthening, the newly born neurons migrate to more superficial layers of the cortex. The migrating daughter cells become the pyramidal cells of the cerebral cortex. The development process is time ordered and regulated by hundreds of genes and epigenetic regulatory mechanisms.

=== Layer organization ===
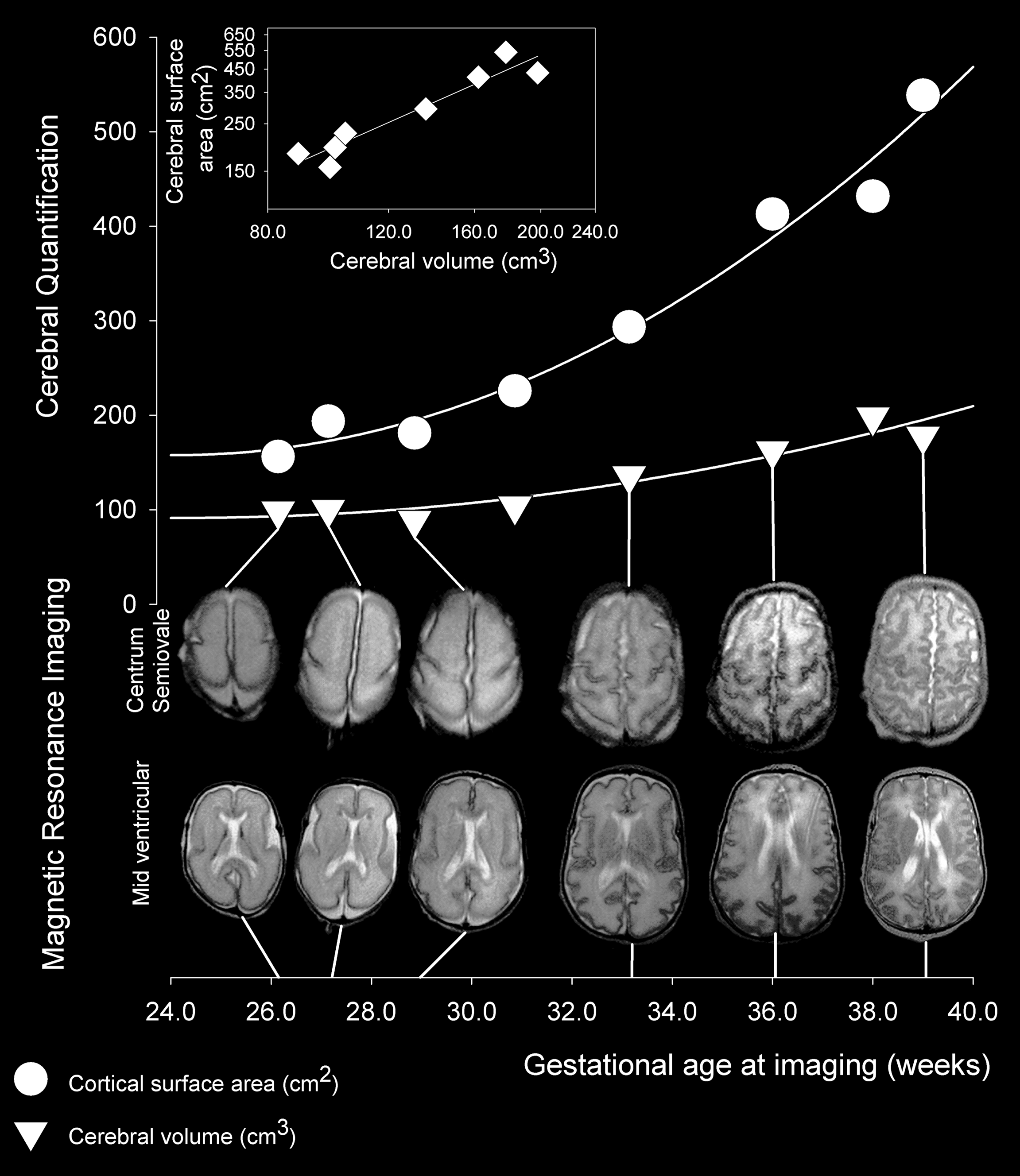
Human cortical development between 26 and 39 week gestational age

The layered structure of the mature cerebral cortex is formed during development. The first pyramidal neurons generated migrate out of the ventricular zone and subventricular zone, together with reelin-producing Cajal–Retzius neurons, from the preplate. Next, a cohort of neurons migrating into the middle of the preplate divides this transient layer into the superficial marginal zone, which will become layer I of the mature neocortex, and the subplate, forming a middle layer called the cortical plate. These cells will form the deep layers of the mature cortex, layers five and six. Later born neurons migrate radially into the cortical plate past the deep layer neurons, and become the upper layers (two to four). Thus, the layers of the cortex are created in an inside-out order. The only exception to this inside-out sequence of neurogenesis occurs in the layer I of primates, in which, in contrast to rodents, neurogenesis continues throughout the entire period of corticogenesis.

=== Cortical patterning ===
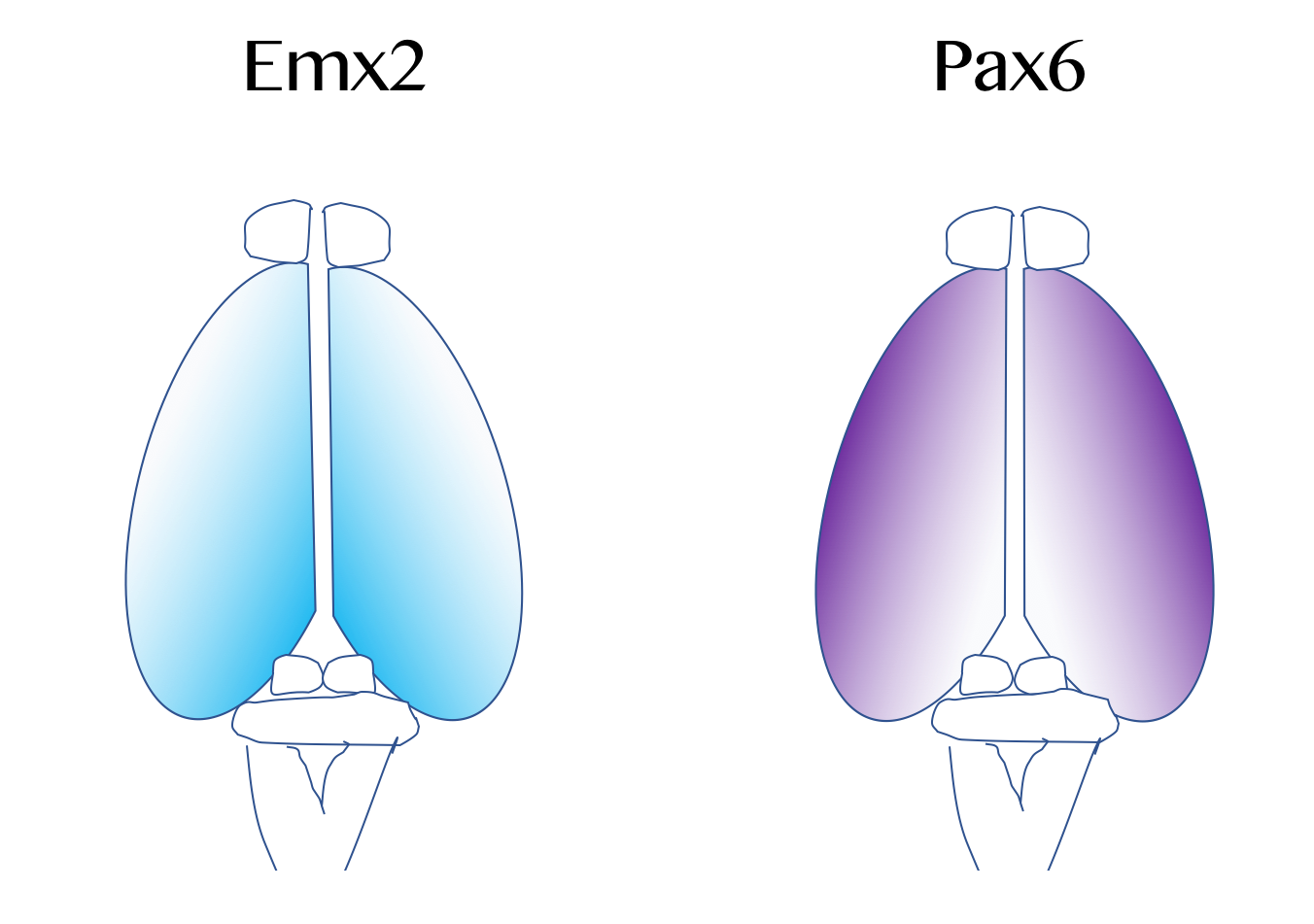
Depicted in blue, Emx2 is highly expressed at the caudomedial pole and dissipates outward. Pax6 expression is represented in purple and is highly expressed at the rostral lateral pole. (Adapted from Sanes, D., Reh, T., & Harris, W. (2012). Development of the Nervous System (3rd ed.). Burlington: Elsevier Science)

The map of functional cortical areas, which include primary motor and visual cortex, originates from a 'protomap', which is regulated by molecular signals such as fibroblast growth factor FGF8 early in embryonic development. These signals regulate the size, shape, and position of cortical areas on the surface of the cortical primordium, in part by regulating gradients of transcription factor expression, through a process called cortical patterning. Examples of such transcription factors include the genes EMX2 and PAX6. Together, both transcription factors form an opposing gradient of expression. Pax6 is highly expressed at the rostral lateral pole, while Emx2 is highly expressed in the caudomedial pole. The establishment of this gradient is important for proper development. For example, mutations in Pax6 can cause expression levels of Emx2 to expand out of its normal expression domain, which would ultimately lead to an expansion of the areas normally derived from the caudal medial cortex, such as the visual cortex. On the contrary, if mutations in Emx2 occur, it can cause the Pax6-expressing domain to expand and result in the frontal and motor cortical regions enlarging. Therefore, researchers believe that similar gradients and signaling centers next to the cortex could contribute to the regional expression of these transcription factors. Two very well studied patterning signals for the cortex include FGF and retinoic acid. If FGFs are misexpressed in different areas of the developing cortex, cortical patterning is disrupted. Specifically, when Fgf8 is increased in the anterior pole, Emx2 is downregulated and a caudal shift in the cortical region occurs. This ultimately causes an expansion of the rostral regions. Therefore, Fgf8 and other FGFs play a role in the regulation of expression of Emx2 and Pax6 and represent how the cerebral cortex can become specialized for different functions.

Rapid expansion of the cortical surface area is regulated by the amount of self-renewal of radial glial cells and is partly regulated by FGF and Notch genes. During the period of cortical neurogenesis and layer formation, many higher mammals begin the process of gyrification, which generates the characteristic folds of the cerebral cortex. Gyrification is regulated by a DNA-associated protein Trnp1 and by FGF and SHH signaling.

== Evolution ==
Of all the different brain regions, the cerebral cortex shows the largest evolutionary variation and has evolved most recently. In contrast to the highly conserved circuitry of the medulla oblongata, for example, which serves critical functions such as regulation of heart and respiration rates, many areas of the cerebral cortex are not strictly necessary for survival. Thus, the evolution of the cerebral cortex has seen the advent and modification of new functional areas—particularly association areas that do not directly receive input from outside the cortex.

A key theory of cortical evolution is embodied in the radial unit hypothesis and related protomap hypothesis, first proposed by Rakic. This theory states that new cortical areas are formed by the addition of new radial units, which is accomplished at the stem cell level. The protomap hypothesis states that the cellular and molecular identity and characteristics of neurons in each cortical area are specified by cortical stem cells, known as radial glial cells, in a primordial map. This map is controlled by secreted signaling proteins and downstream transcription factors.

== Function ==
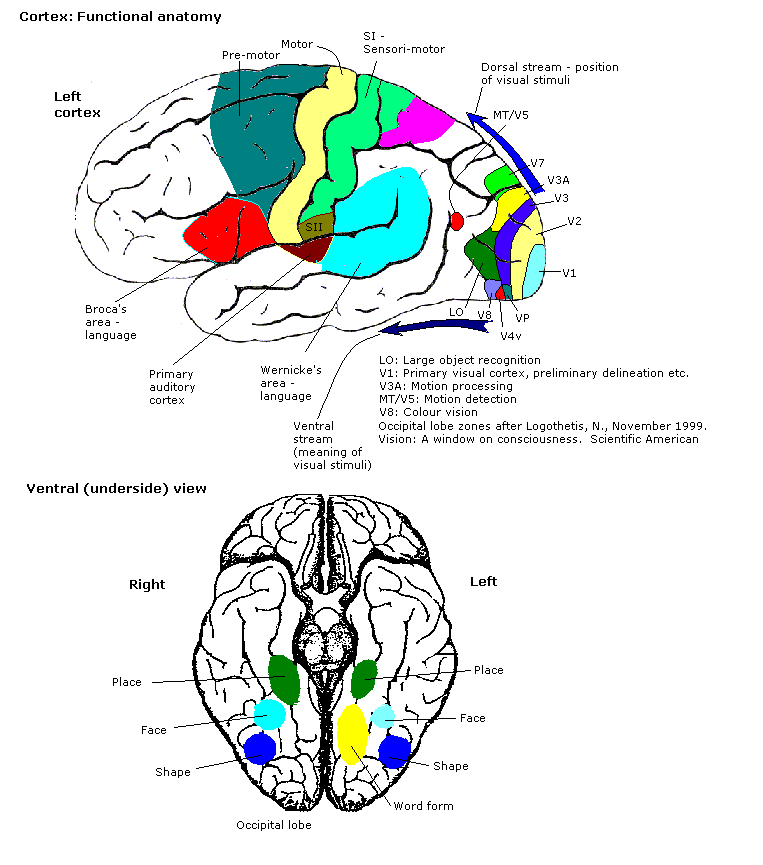
Some functional areas of cortex

=== Connections ===
The cerebral cortex is connected to various subcortical structures such as the thalamus and the basal ganglia, sending information to them along efferent connections and receiving information from them via afferent connections. Most sensory information is routed to the cerebral cortex via the thalamus. Olfactory information, however, passes through the olfactory bulb to the olfactory cortex (piriform cortex). The majority of connections are from one area of the cortex to another, rather than from subcortical areas; Braitenberg and Schüz (1998) claim that in primary sensory areas, at the cortical level where the input fibers terminate, up to 20% of the synapses are supplied by extracortical afferents but that in other areas and other layers the percentage is likely to be much lower.

=== Cortical areas ===
The whole of the cerebral cortex was divided into 52 different areas in an early presentation by Korbinian Brodmann. These areas, known as Brodmann areas, are based on their cytoarchitecture but also relate to various functions. An example is Brodmann area 17, which is the primary visual cortex.

In more general terms the cortex is typically described as comprising three parts: sensory, motor, and association areas. Sensory and motor areas are defined as primary regions, while association areas work with primary regions but go beyond them.

==== Sensory areas ====
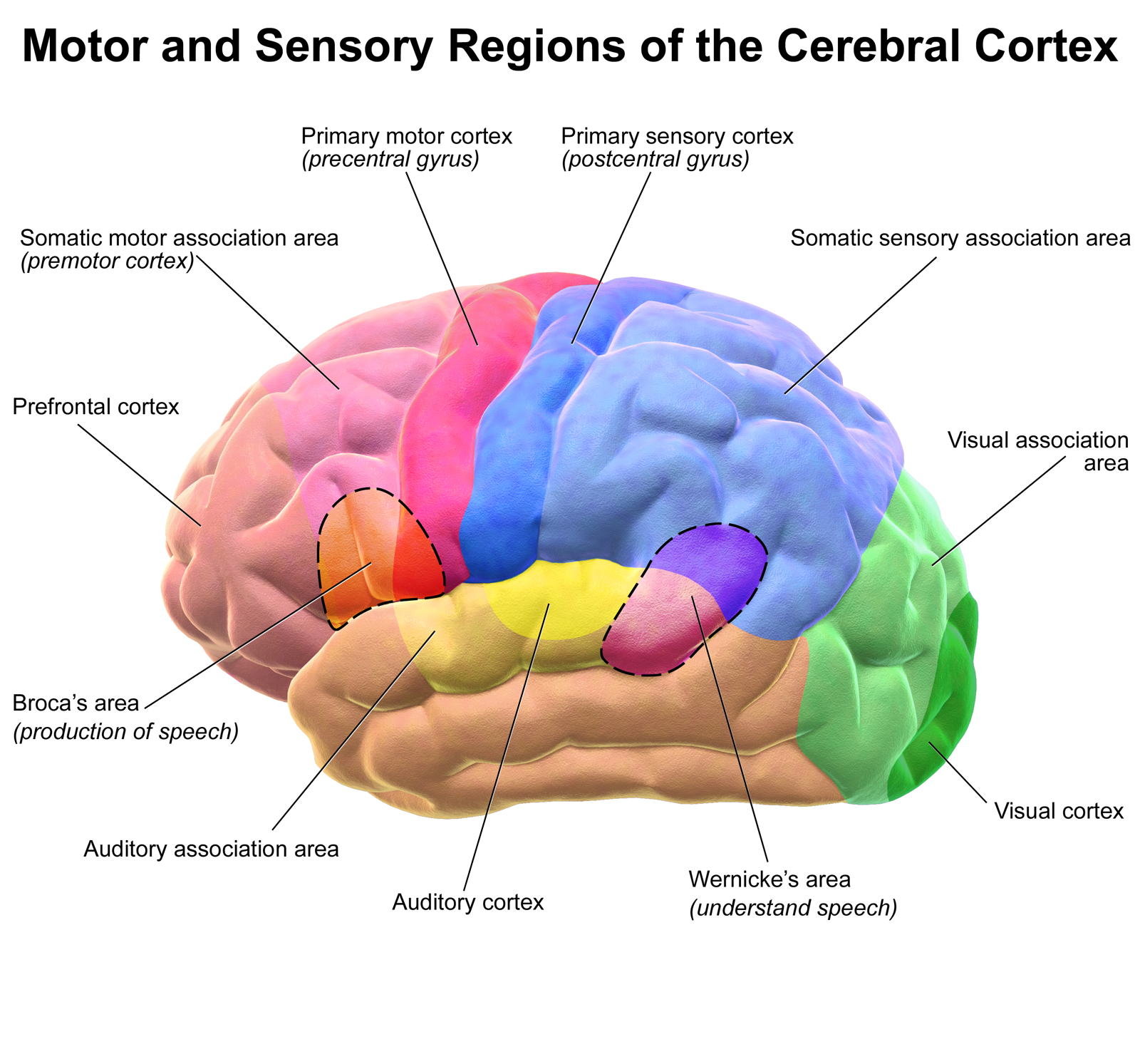
Motor and sensory regions of the cerebral cortex

The sensory areas are the cortical areas that receive and process information from the senses. Parts of the cortex that receive sensory inputs from the thalamus are called primary sensory areas. The senses of vision, hearing, and touch are served by the primary visual cortex, primary auditory cortex and primary somatosensory cortex respectively. In general, the two hemispheres receive information from the opposite (contralateral) side of the body. For example, the right primary somatosensory cortex receives information from the left limbs, and the right visual cortex receives information from the left visual field.

The organization of sensory maps in the cortex reflects that of the corresponding sensing organ, in what is known as a topographic map. Neighboring points in the primary visual cortex, for example, correspond to neighboring points in the retina. This topographic map is called a retinotopic map. In the same way, there exists a tonotopic map in the primary auditory cortex and a somatotopic map in the primary sensory cortex. This last topographic map of the body onto the posterior central gyrus has been illustrated as a deformed human representation, the somatosensory homunculus, where the size of different body parts reflects the relative density of their innervation. Areas with much sensory innervation, such as the fingertips and the lips, require more cortical area to process finer sensation.

==== Motor areas ====
The motor areas are located in both hemispheres of the cortex. The motor areas are very closely related to the control of voluntary movements, especially fine fragmented movements performed by the hand. The right half of the motor area controls the left side of the body, and vice versa.

Two areas of the cortex are commonly referred to as motor:

- Primary motor cortex, which executes voluntary movements
- Supplementary motor areas and premotor cortex, which select voluntary movements.

In addition, motor functions have been described for:

- Posterior parietal cortex, which guides voluntary movements in space
- Dorsolateral prefrontal cortex, which decides which voluntary movements to make according to higher-order instructions, rules, and self-generated thoughts.

Just underneath the cerebral cortex are interconnected subcortical masses of grey matter called basal ganglia (or nuclei). The basal ganglia receive input from the substantia nigra of the midbrain and motor areas of the cerebral cortex, and send signals back to both of these locations. They are involved in motor control. They are found lateral to the thalamus. The main components of the basal ganglia are the caudate nucleus, the putamen, the globus pallidus, the substantia nigra, the nucleus accumbens, and the subthalamic nucleus. The putamen and globus pallidus are also collectively known as the lentiform nucleus, because together they form a lens-shaped body. The putamen and caudate nucleus are also collectively called the corpus striatum after their striped appearance.

==== Association areas ====
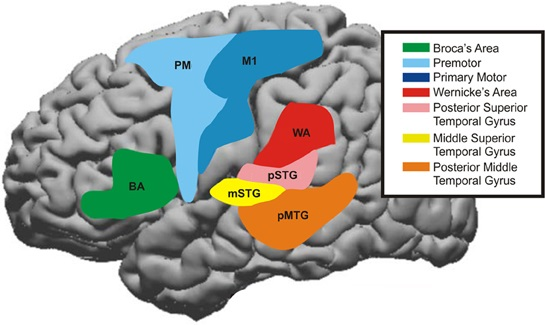
Cortical areas involved in speech processing.

The association areas are the parts of the cerebral cortex that do not belong to the primary regions. They function to produce a meaningful perceptual experience of the world, enable us to interact effectively, and support abstract thinking and language. The parietal, temporal, and occipital lobes – all located in the posterior part of the cortex – integrate sensory information and information stored in memory. The frontal lobe or prefrontal association complex is involved in planning actions and movement, as well as abstract thought. Globally, the association areas are organized as distributed networks. Each network connects areas distributed across widely spaced regions of the cortex. Distinct networks are positioned adjacent to one another yielding a complex series of interwoven networks. The specific organization of the association networks is debated with evidence for interactions, hierarchical relationships, and competition between networks.

In humans, association networks are particularly important to language function. In the past it was theorized that language abilities are localized in Broca's area in areas of the left inferior frontal gyrus, BA44 and BA45, for language expression and in Wernicke's area BA22, for language reception. However, the processes of language expression and reception have been shown to occur in areas other than just those structures around the lateral sulcus, including the frontal lobe, basal ganglia, cerebellum, and pons.

== Clinical significance ==
Hemodynamic changes observed on gyrencephalic brain cortex after an arterial vessel occlusion in IOS. The video has a speed of 50x to better appreciate the spreading depolarization over the brain cortex. Pictures are dynamically subtracted to a reference picture 40 s before. First we see the initial area of change at the exact moment where the middle cerebral artery group (left) is occluded. The area is highlighted with a white line. Later we appreciate the signal produced by Spreading Depolarizations. We see markedly the front of waves. https://doi.org/10.1007/s00701-019-04132-8

Neurodegenerative diseases such as Alzheimer's disease, show as a marker, an atrophy of the grey matter of the cerebral cortex.Fractal dimension of the cerebral cortex of patients with Alzheimer's disease differs from the fractal dimension of the cerebral cortex of healthy individuals.

Other diseases of the central nervous system include neurological disorders such as epilepsy, movement disorders, and different types of aphasia (difficulties in speech expression or comprehension).

Brain damage from disease or trauma, can involve damage to a specific lobe such as in frontal lobe disorder, and associated functions will be affected. The blood–brain barrier that serves to protect the brain from infection can become compromised allowing entry to pathogens.

The developing fetus is susceptible to a range of environmental factors that can cause birth defects and problems in later development. Maternal alcohol consumption for example can cause fetal alcohol spectrum disorder. Other factors that can cause neurodevelopment disorders are toxicants such as drugs, and exposure to radiation as from X-rays. Infections can also affect the development of the cortex. A viral infection is one of the causes of lissencephaly, which results in a smooth cortex without gyrification.

A type of electrocorticography called cortical stimulation mapping is an invasive procedure that involves placing electrodes directly onto the exposed brain in order to localise the functions of specific areas of the cortex. It is used in clinical and therapeutic applications including pre-surgical mapping.

=== Genes associated with cortical disorders ===
There are a number of genetic mutations that can cause a wide range of genetic disorders of the cerebral cortex, including microcephaly, schizencephaly and types of lissencephaly. Chromosome abnormalities can also result causing a number of neurodevelopmental disorders such as fragile X syndrome and Rett syndrome.

MCPH1 codes for microcephalin, and disorders in this and in ASPM are associated with microcephaly. Mutations in the gene NBS1 that codes for nibrin can cause Nijmegen breakage syndrome, characterised by microcephaly.

Mutations in EMX2, and COL4A1 are associated with schizencephaly, a condition marked by the absence of large parts of the cerebral hemispheres.

== History ==
In 1909, Korbinian Brodmann distinguished 52 different regions of the cerebral cortex based on their cytoarchitecture. These are known as Brodmann areas.

Rafael Lorente de Nó, a student of Santiago Ramon y Cajal, identified more than 40 different types of cortical neurons based on the distribution of their dendrites and axons.

== Other animals ==
The cerebral cortex is derived from the pallium, a layered structure found in the forebrain of all vertebrates. The basic form of the pallium is a cylindrical layer enclosing fluid-filled ventricles. Around the circumference of the cylinder are four zones, the dorsal pallium, medial pallium, ventral pallium, and lateral pallium, which are thought to be homologous to the neocortex, hippocampus, amygdala, and olfactory cortex, respectively.

In avian brains, evidence suggests the avian pallium's neuroarchitecture to be reminiscent of the mammalian cerebral cortex. The avian pallium has also been suggested to be an equivalent neural basis for consciousness.

Until recently no counterpart to the cerebral cortex had been recognized in invertebrates. However, a study published in the journal Cell in 2010, based on gene expression profiles, reported strong affinities between the cerebral cortex and the mushroom bodies of the ragworm Platynereis dumerilii. Mushroom bodies are structures in the brains of many types of worms and arthropods that are known to play important roles in learning and memory; the genetic evidence indicates a common evolutionary origin, and therefore indicates that the origins of the earliest precursors of the cerebral cortex date back to the Precambrian era.

== Additional images ==
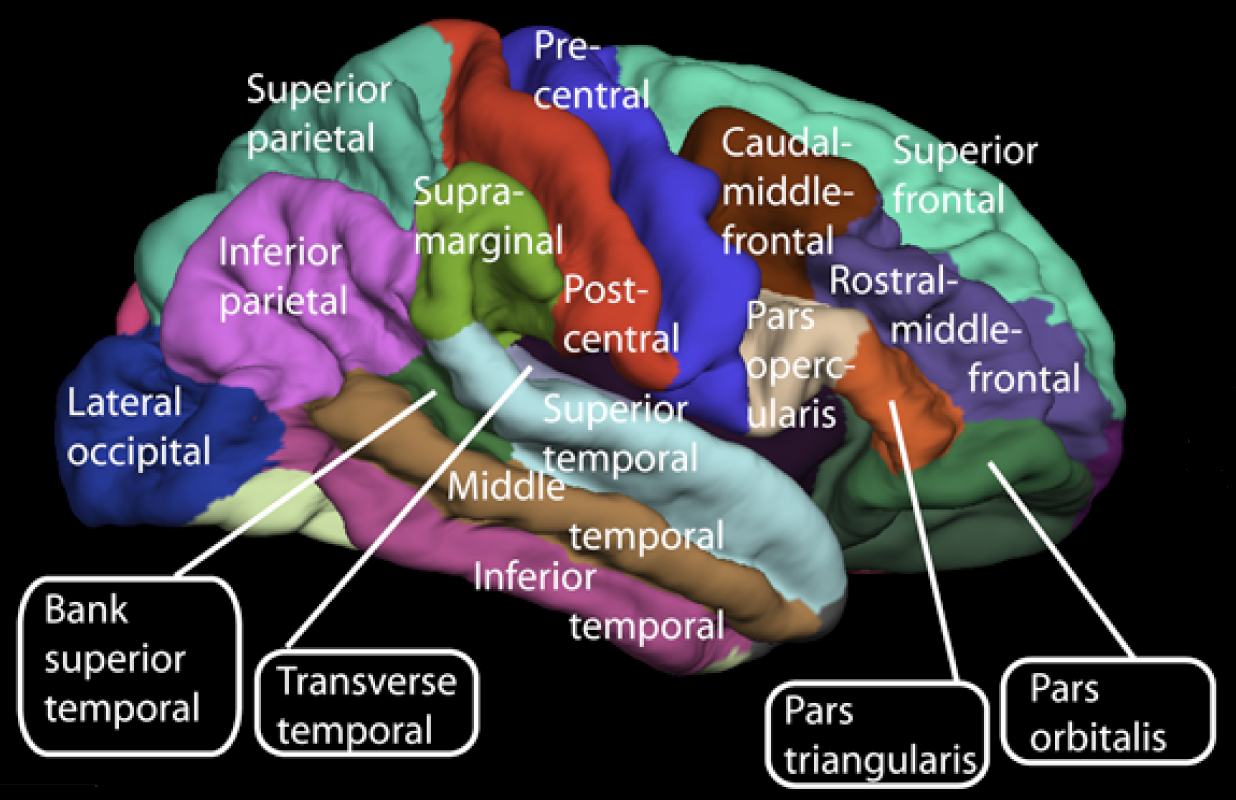
Lateral surface of the human cerebral cortex

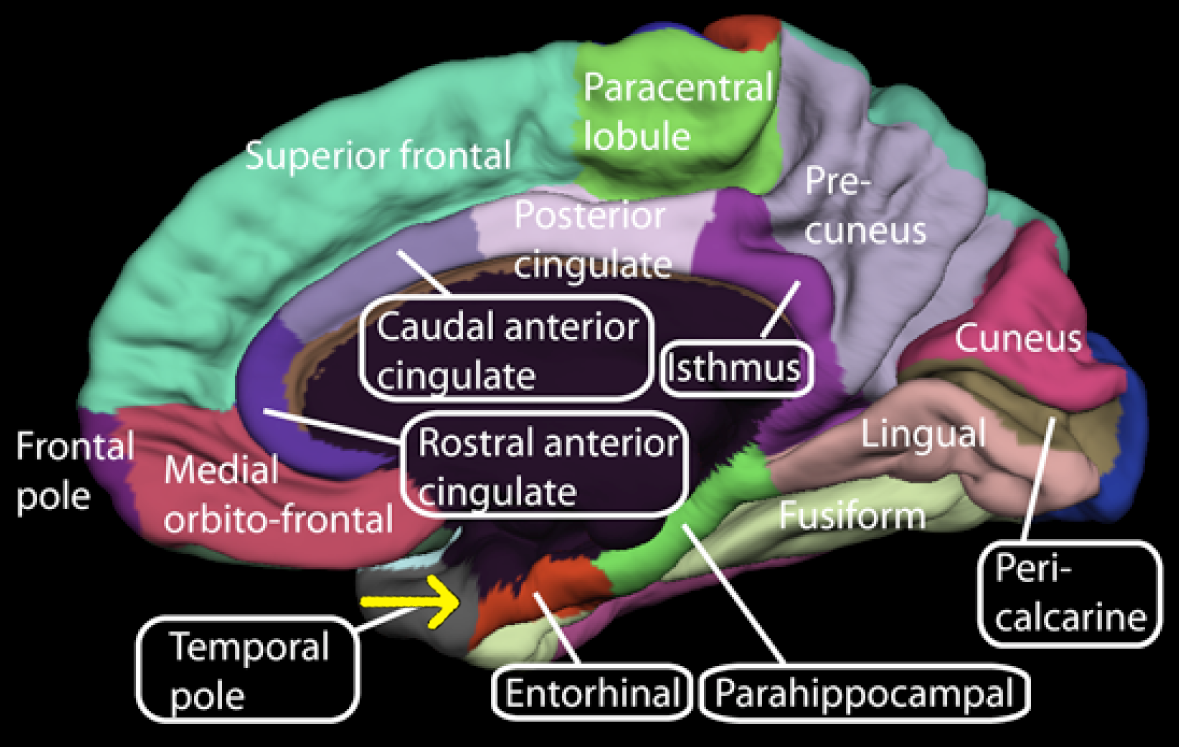
Medial surface of the human cerebral cortex

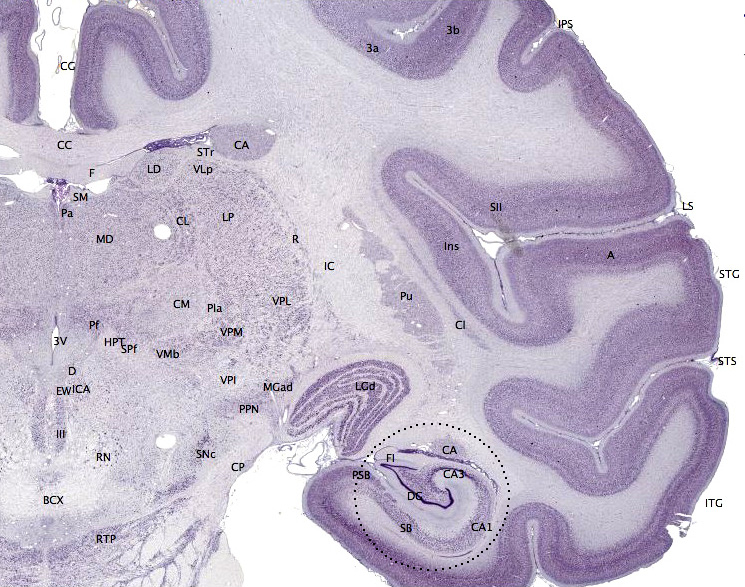
Tissue slice from the brain of an adult macaque monkey. The cerebral cortex is depicted in dark violet.

== See also ==
- Brain–computer interface
- Cortical dysplasia
- Cortical homunculus
- Eloquent cortex
- EMX1
- Gray matter heterotopia
- Insular cortex
- Limbic system
- List of regions in the human brain
