= Neurogenesis =

Generation of cells within the nervous system

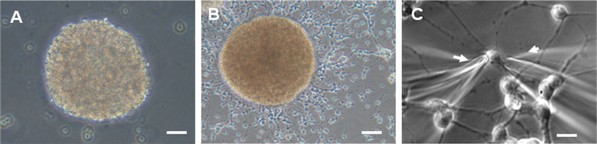
- A neurosphere of neural stem cells in rat embryo spreads out into a single layer of cells. A) Neurosphere of subventricular zone cells after two days in culture. B) Shows the neurosphere at four days in culture and cells migrating away. C) Cells at the periphery of the neurosphere mostly having extending processes.

Identifiers
- MeSH: D055495

Neurogenesis is the process by which nervous system cells, the neurons, are produced by neural stem cells (NSCs). This occurs in all species of animals except the porifera (sponges) and placozoans. Types of NSCs include neuroepithelial cells (NECs), radial glial cells (RGCs), basal progenitors (BPs), intermediate neuronal precursors (INPs), subventricular zone astrocytes, and subgranular zone radial astrocytes, among others.

Neurogenesis is most active during embryonic development and is responsible for producing all the various types of neurons of the organism, but it continues throughout adult life in a variety of organisms. Once born, neurons do not divide (see mitosis), and many will live the lifespan of the animal, except under extraordinary and usually pathogenic circumstances.

== In mammals ==
=== Developmental neurogenesis ===
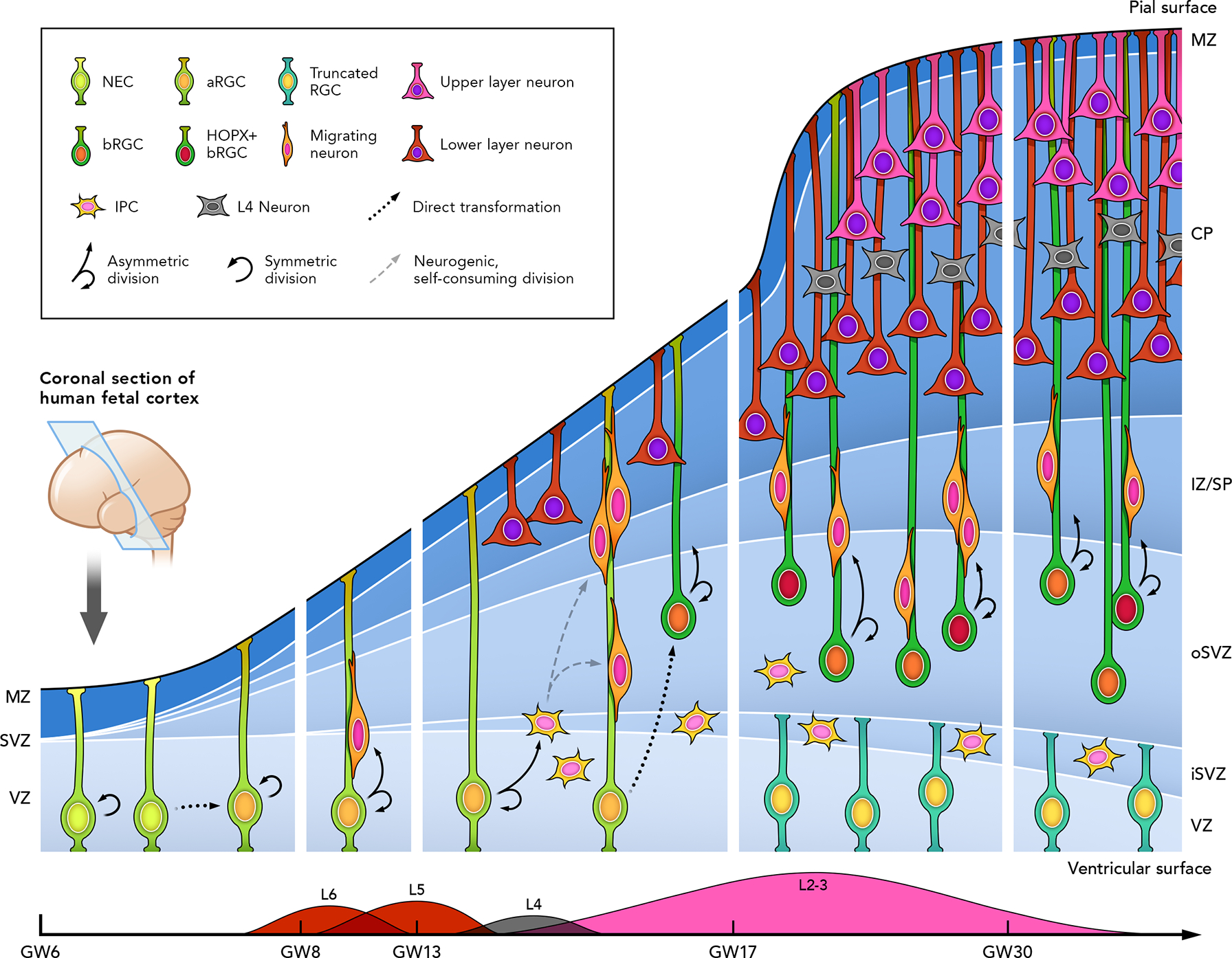
Stages of neuronal development in the fetal cerebral cortex

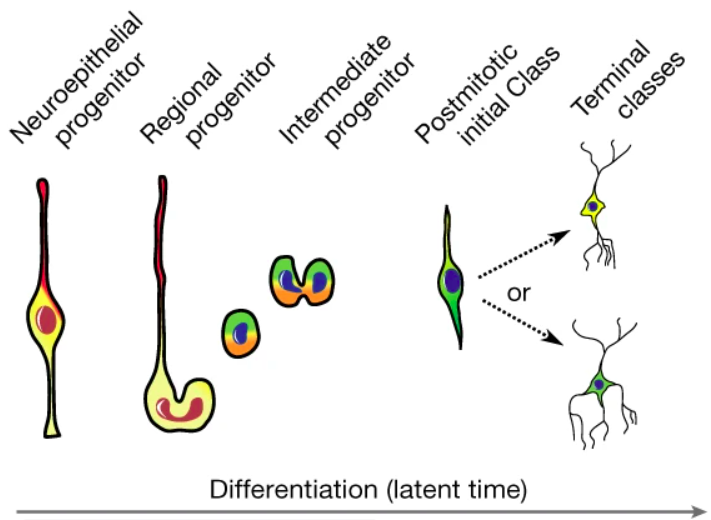
Model of mammalian neurogenesis

During embryonic development, the mammalian central nervous system (CNS; brain and spinal cord) is derived from the neural tube, which contains NSCs that will later generate neurons. However, neurogenesis doesn't begin until a sufficient population of NSCs has been achieved. These early stem cells are called neuroepithelial cells (NEC)s, but soon take on a highly elongated radial morphology and are then known as radial glial cells (RGC)s. RGCs are the primary stem cells of the mammalian CNS, and reside in the embryonic ventricular zone, which lies adjacent to the central fluid-filled cavity (ventricular system) of the neural tube. Following RGC proliferation, neurogenesis involves a final cell division of the parent RGC, which produces one of two possible outcomes. First, this may generate a subclass of neuronal progenitors called intermediate neuronal precursors (INP)s, which will divide one or more times to produce neurons. Alternatively, daughter neurons may be produced directly. Neurons do not immediately form neural circuits through the growth of axons and dendrites. Instead, newborn neurons must first migrate long distances to their final destinations, maturing and finally generating neural circuitry. For example, neurons born in the ventricular zone migrate radially to the cortical plate, which is where neurons accumulate to form the cerebral cortex. Thus, the generation of neurons occurs in a specific tissue compartment or 'neurogenic niche' occupied by their parent stem cells.

The rate of neurogenesis and the type of neuron generated (broadly, excitatory or inhibitory) are principally determined by molecular and genetic factors. These factors notably include the Notch signaling pathway, and many genes have been linked to Notch pathway regulation. The genes and mechanisms involved in regulating neurogenesis are the subject of intensive research in academic, pharmaceutical, and government settings worldwide.

The amount of time required to generate all the neurons of the CNS varies widely across mammals, and brain neurogenesis is not always complete by the time of birth. For example, mice undergo cortical neurogenesis from about embryonic day (post-conceptional day) (E)11 to E17, and are born at about E19.5. Ferrets are born at E42, although their period of cortical neurogenesis does not end until a few days after birth. In contrast, neurogenesis in humans generally begins around gestational week (GW) 10 and ends around GW 25 with birth about GW 38–40.

==== Epigenetic modification ====
As embryonic development of the mammalian brain unfolds, neural progenitor and stem cells switch from proliferative divisions to differentiative divisions. This progression leads to the generation of neurons and glia that populate cortical layers. Epigenetic modifications play a key role in regulating gene expression in the cellular differentiation of neural stem cells. Epigenetic modifications include DNA cytosine methylation to form 5-methylcytosine and 5-methylcytosine demethylation. These modifications are critical for cell fate determination in the developing and adult mammalian brain.

DNA cytosine methylation is catalyzed by DNA methyltransferases (DNMTs). Methylcytosine demethylation is catalyzed in several stages by TET enzymes that carry out oxidative reactions (e.g. 5-methylcytosine to 5-hydroxymethylcytosine) and enzymes of the DNA base excision repair (BER) pathway.

=== Adult neurogenesis ===
Neurogenesis can be a complex process in some mammals. In rodents for example, neurons in the central nervous system arise from three types of neural stem and progenitor cells: neuroepithelial cells, radial glial cells and basal progenitors, which go through three main divisions: symmetric proliferative division; asymmetric neurogenic division; and symmetric neurogenic division. Out of all the three cell types, neuroepithelial cells that pass through neurogenic divisions have a much more extended cell cycle than those that go through proliferative divisions, such as the radial glial cells and basal progenitors. In the human, adult neurogenesis has been shown to occur at low levels compared with development, and in only three regions of the brain: the adult subventricular zone (SVZ) of the lateral ventricles, the amygdala and the dentate gyrus of the hippocampus.

==== Subventricular zone ====
In many mammals, including rodents, the olfactory bulb is a brain region containing cells that detect smell, featuring integration of adult-born neurons, which migrate from the SVZ of the striatum to the olfactory bulb through the rostral migratory stream (RMS). The migrating neuroblasts in the olfactory bulb become interneurons that help the brain communicate with these sensory cells. The majority of those interneurons are inhibitory granule cells, but a small number are periglomerular cells. In the adult SVZ, the primary neural stem cells are SVZ astrocytes rather than RGCs. Most of these adult neural stem cells lie dormant in the adult, but in response to certain signals, these dormant cells, or B cells, go through a series of stages, first producing proliferating cells, or C cells. The C cells then produce neuroblasts, or A cells, that will become neurons.

==== Hippocampus ====
Significant neurogenesis also occurs during adulthood in the hippocampus of many mammals, from rodents to some primates, although its existence in adult humans is debated. The hippocampus plays a crucial role in the formation of new declarative memories, and it has been theorized that the reason human infants cannot form declarative memories is because they are still undergoing extensive neurogenesis in the hippocampus and their memory-generating circuits are immature. Many environmental factors, such as exercise, stress, and antidepressants have been reported to change the rate of neurogenesis within the hippocampus of rodents. Some evidence indicates postnatal neurogenesis in the human hippocampus decreases sharply in newborns for the first year or two after birth, dropping to "undetectable levels in adults."

== In other organisms ==
Neurogenesis has been best characterized in model organisms such as the fruit fly Drosophila melanogaster. Neurogenesis in these organisms occur in the medulla cortex region of their optic lobes. These organisms can represent a model for the genetic analysis of adult neurogenesis and brain regeneration. There has been research that discuss how the study of "damage-responsive progenitor cells" in Drosophila can help to identify regenerative neurogenesis and how to find new ways to increase brain rebuilding. Recently, a study was made to show how "low-level adult neurogenesis" has been identified in Drosophila, specifically in the medulla cortex region, in which neural precursors could increase the production of new neurons, making neurogenesis occur. In Drosophila, Notch signaling was first described, controlling a cell-to-cell signaling process called lateral inhibition, in which neurons are selectively generated from epithelial cells. In some vertebrates, regenerative neurogenesis has also been shown to occur.

== Substance-induced neurogenesis ==
An in vitro and in vivo study found that DMT present in the ayahuasca infusion promotes neurogenesis on the subgranular zone of the dentate gyrus in the hippocampus. A study showed that a low dose (0.1 mg/kg) of psilocybin given to mice increased neurogenesis in the hippocampus 2 weeks after administration, while a high dose (1 mg/kg) significantly decreased neurogenesis. No orally-available drugs are known to elicit neurogenesis outside of the already neurogenic niches.

== Other findings ==
There is evidence that new neurons are produced in the dentate gyrus of the adult mammalian hippocampus, the brain region important for learning, motivation, memory, and emotion. A study reported that newly made cells in the adult mouse hippocampus can display passive membrane properties, action potentials and synaptic inputs similar to the ones found in mature dentate granule cells. These findings suggested that these newly made cells can mature into more practical and useful neurons in the adult mammalian brain. Recent studies confirm that microglia, the resident immune cell of the brain, establish direct contacts with the cell bodies of developing neurons, and through these connections, regulate neurogenesis, migration, integration and the formation of neuronal networks.

== See also ==
- Neurulation
- Gliogenesis
- Neuronal migration disorder
- Neuroplasticity
