= Radial glial cell =

Bipolar-shaped progenitor cells of all neurons in the cerebral cortex and some glia

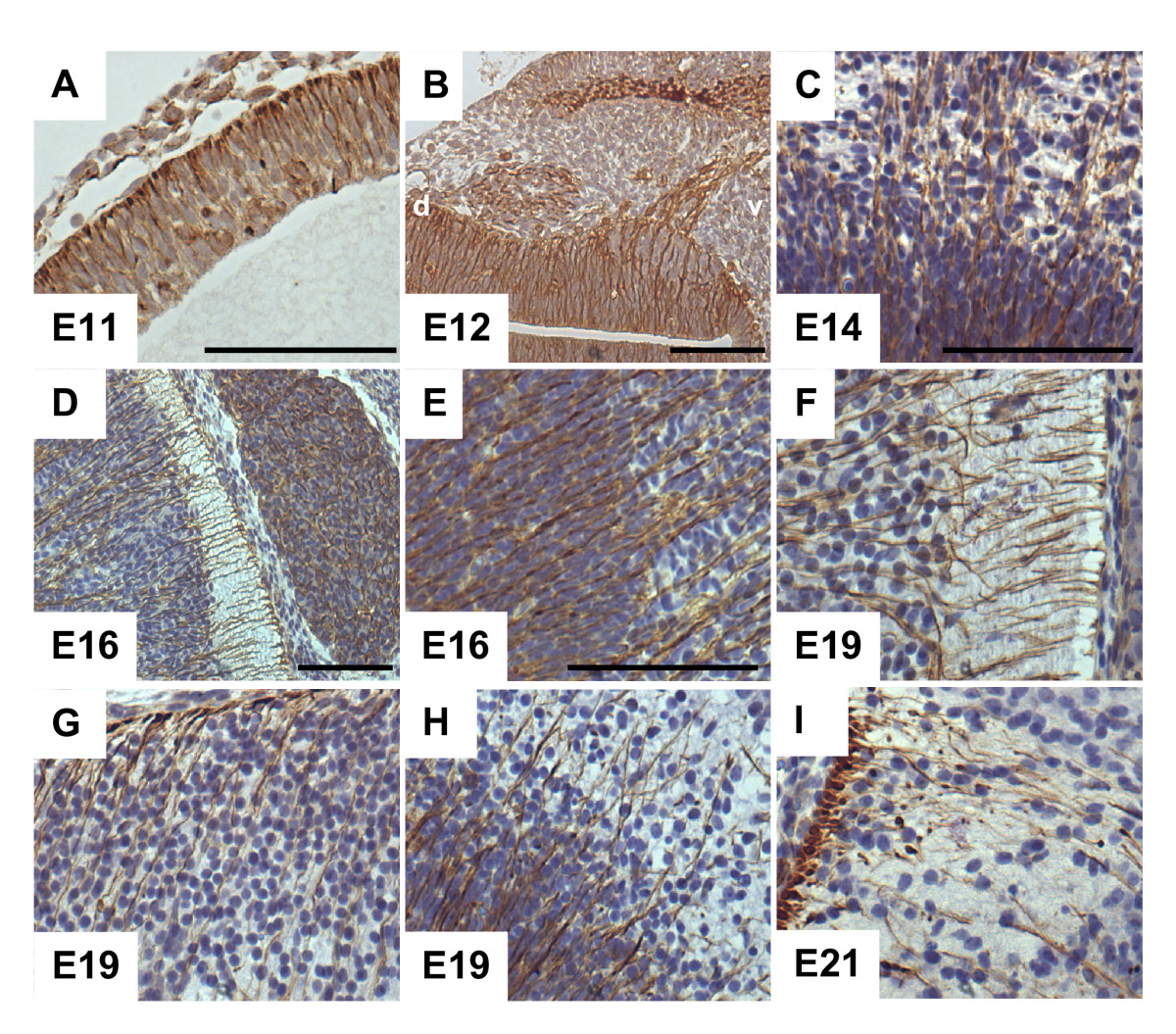
- G-CSF receptor expression clearly delineates cells of radial glia in the embryonic murine brain. From Kirsch et al., 2008.

Details

Identifiers
- Latin: gliocytus radialis
- TH: H3.11.08.3.01098

Radial glial cells (RGCs), or radial glial progenitor cells (RGPs), are bipolar-shaped progenitor cells that are responsible for producing all of the neurons in the cerebral cortex. RGPs also produce certain lineages of glia, including astrocytes and oligodendrocytes. Their cell bodies (somata) reside in the embryonic ventricular zone, which lies next to the developing ventricular system.

During development, newborn neurons use radial glia as scaffolds, traveling along the radial glial fibers in order to reach their final destinations. Despite the various possible fates of the radial glial population, it has been demonstrated through clonal analysis that most radial glia have restricted, unipotent or multipotent, fates. Radial glia can be found during the neurogenic phase in all vertebrates (studied to date).

The term "radial glia" refers to the morphological characteristics of these cells that were first observed: namely, their radial processes and their similarity to astrocytes, another member of the glial cell family.

== Structure ==
=== Müller glia ===
Müller glia are radial glial cells that are present in the developing, as well as the adult, retina. As in the cortex, Müller glia have long processes that span the entire width of the retina, from the basal cell layer to the apical layer. However, unlike cortical radial glia, Müller glia do not appear in the retina until after the first rounds of neurogenesis have occurred. Studies suggest that Müller glia can dedifferentiate into readily dividing neural progenitors in response to injury.

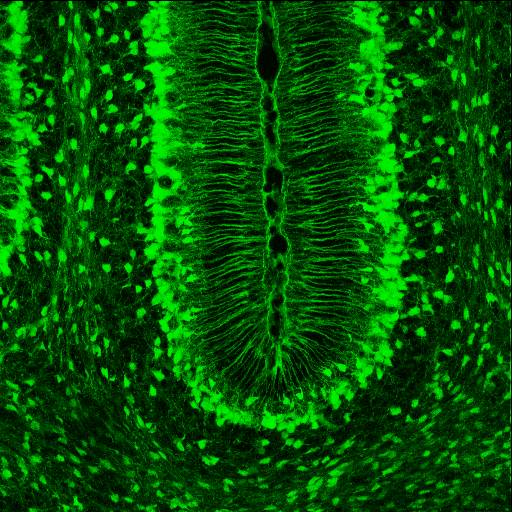
Slcla3 in Bergmann Glia

The characteristics that truly set Müller glia apart from radial glia in other areas of the brain is their possession of optical properties. The majority of the retina is actually largely light scattering, suggesting that Müller glia serve as the main fiber responsible for the relay of light to the photoreceptors in the rear of the retina. Properties that help Müller glia achieve this function include a limited number mitochondria (which are very light scattering), as well as a specialized arrangement of internal protein filaments.

Müller glia are the predominant type of macroglia in the retina, so they take on many of the supportive functions that astrocytes and oligodendrocytes usually handle in the rest of the central nervous system.

=== Bergmann glia ===
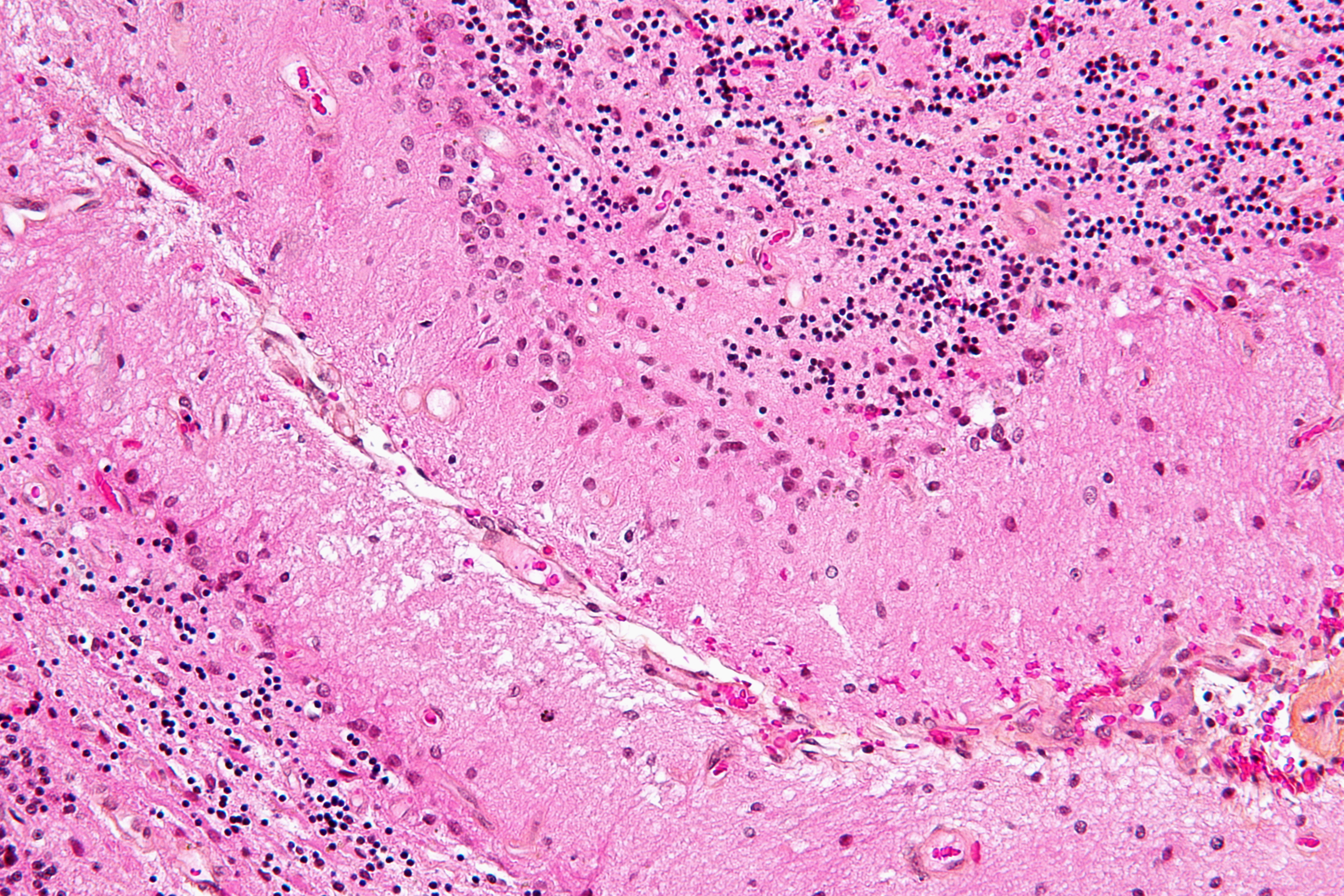
Micrograph showing Bergmann gliosis. H&E stain.

Bergmann glia (also known as radial epithelial cells, Golgi epithelial cells, or radial astrocytes) are unipolar astrocytes derived from radial glia that are intimately associated with Purkinje cells in the cerebellum. Since Bergmann glia appear to persist in the cerebellum, and perform many of the roles characteristic of astrocytes, they have also been called "specialized astrocytes." Bergmann glia have multiple radial processes that extend across the molecular layer of the cerebellar cortex and terminate at the pial surface as a bulbous endfoot. Bergmann glial cells assist with the migration of granule cells, guiding the small neurons from the external granular layer down to the internal granular layer along their extensive radial processes. Besides their role in early development of the cerebellum, Bergmann glia are also required for synaptic pruning. Following Purkinje cell death induced by CNS injury, Bergmann glia undergo extensive proliferative changes so as to replace lost or damaged tissue in a process known as gliosis.

== Development ==
Radial glial cells originate from the transformation of neuroepithelial cells that form the neural plate during neurogenesis in early embryonic development. This process is mediated through the down-regulation of epithelium-related protein expression (such as tight junctions) and an up-regulation of glial-specific features such as glycogen granules, the astrocyte glutamate aspartate transporter (GLAST), the intermediate filament vimentin, and, in some instances, including humans, glial fibrillary acidic protein (GFAP).

After this transition, radial glia retain many of the original characteristics of neuroepithelial cells including: their apical-basal polarity, their position along the lateral ventricles of the developing cortex, and the phasic migration of their nuclei depending on their location with the cell cycle (termed "interkinetic nuclear migration").

== Function ==
=== Progenitors ===
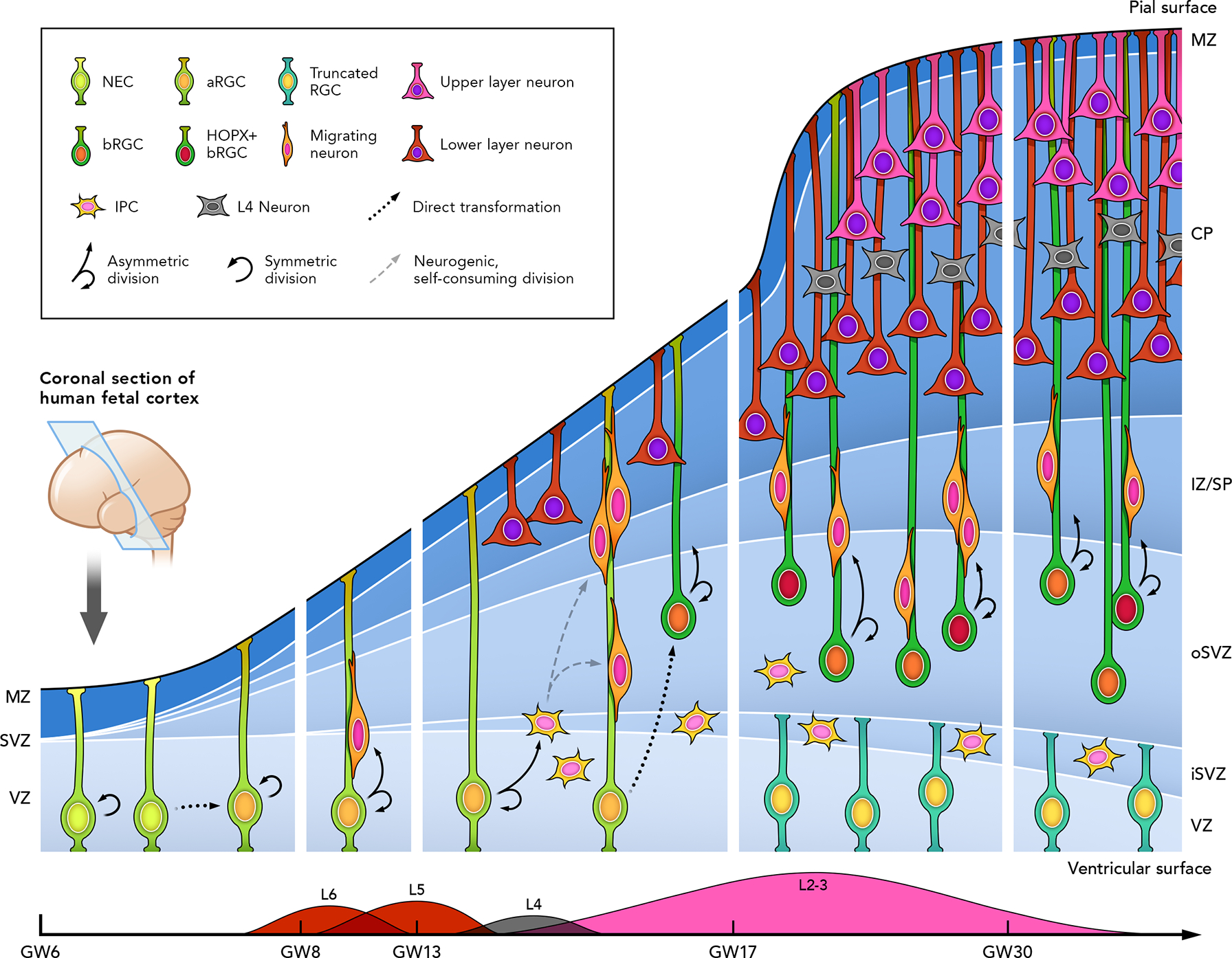
Stages of neuronal development in the fetal cerebral cortex from radial glial cells

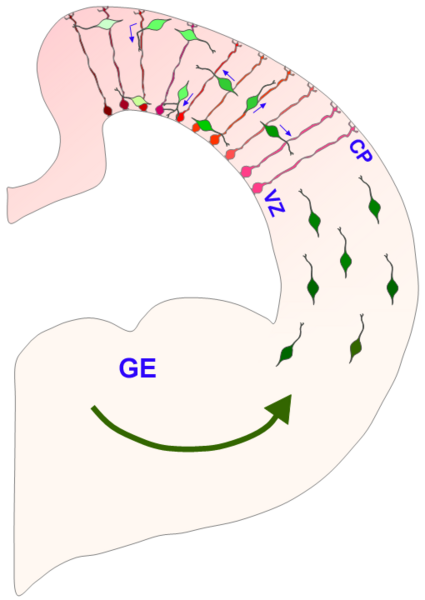
Interneuron-radial glial interactions in the developing cerebral cortex

Radial glia are now recognized as key progenitor cells in the developing nervous system. During the late stages of neurogenesis, radial glial cells divide asymmetrically in the ventricular zone, generating a new radial glial cell, as well as a postmitotic neuron or an intermediate progenitor (IPC) daughter cell. Intermediate progenitor cells then divide symmetrically in the subventricular zone to generate neurons. Local environmental cues such as Notch and fibroblast growth factor (FGF) signaling, developmental period, and differing abilities of radial glia to respond to environmental cues have all been shown to influence the type of radial glia and radial glia-derived daughter cells that will be produced. FGF and Notch signaling regulate the proliferation of radial glia and the rate of neurogenesis, which affects the surface area expansion of the cerebral cortex and its ability to form surface convolutions known as gyri (see gyrification). Radial glial cells show high levels of calcium transient activity, which is transmitted between RGCs in the ventricular zone and along the radial fibers bidirectionally to/from the cortical plate. The calcium activity is thought to promote RGC proliferation and could be involved in radial communication before synapses are present in the brain. Additionally, recent evidence suggests that cues from the external sensory environment can also influence the proliferation and neural differentiation of radial glia.

At the conclusion of cortical development, most radial glia lose their attachment to the ventricles, and migrate towards the surface of the cortex, where, in mammals, most will become astrocytes during the process of gliogenesis.

While it has been suggested that radial glia most likely give rise to oligodendrocytes, through the generation of oligodendrocyte progenitor cells (OPCs), and OPCs can be generated from radial glial cells in vitro, more evidence is yet needed to conclude whether this process also occurs in the developing brain.

Recently, radial glia that exclusively generate upper-layer cortical neurons have also been discovered. Since upper cortical layers have expanded greatly in recent evolution, and are associated with higher-level information processing and thinking, radial glia have been implicated as important mediators of brain evolution.

=== Migration pattern ===
The best characterized and first widely accepted function of radial glia is their role as scaffolds for neuronal migration in the cerebral and cerebellar cortexes. This role can be easily visualized using the electron microscope or high-resolution time-lapse microscopy, through which neurons can be seen tightly wrapped around radial glia as they travel upwards through the cortex. Additional evidence suggests that many neurons may move between neighboring radial glial fibers during migration.

While excitatory neuronal migration is largely radial, inhibitory GABAergic neurons have been shown to undergo tangential migration. Tangentially migrating neurons also appear to initiate contact with radial glial fibers in the developing cortex of ferrets, implicating radial glial cells in both of these forms of migration.

As radial glia seem to differentiate late in spinal cord development, near the onset of gliogenesis, it is unclear whether they are involved in spinal cord neurogenesis or migration.

=== Compartmentalization ===
Radial glia have also been implicated in forming boundaries between different axonal tracts and white matter areas of the brain.

== Clinical significance ==
As radial glia serve as the primary neural and glial progenitors in the brain, as well as being crucial for proper neuronal migration, defects in radial glial function can have profound effects in the development of the nervous system.

Mutations in either Lis1 or Nde1, essential proteins for radial glial differentiation and stabilization, cause the associated neurodevelopmental diseases Lissencephaly and microlissencephaly (which literally translate to "smooth brain"). Patients with these diseases are characterized by a lack of cortical folds (sulci and gyri) and reduced brain volume. Extreme cases of Lissencephaly cause death a few months after birth, while patients with milder forms may experience intellectual disability, difficulty balancing, motor and speech deficits, and epilepsy.

Death of neural progenitor cells has recently been linked the mosquito-borne virus, Zika. Epidemiological evidence indicates infection of the embryo within the first two trimesters of pregnancy has potential to cause fetal birth defects and microcephaly, possibly due to the death of progenitor cells. Further, mutations in microcephaly associated genes which encode proteins such as WDR62 can lead to radial glial depletion during brain development which ultimately leads to a smaller brain size and mental disabilities.

== History ==
Camillo Golgi, using his silver staining technique (later deemed the Golgi method), first described radially oriented cells spanning from the central canal to the outer surface of the embryonic chick spinal cord, in 1885.

Using the Golgi method, Giuseppe Magini then studied the mammalian fetal cerebral cortex in 1888, confirming the similar presence of elongated radial cells in the cortex (also described by Kölliker just before him), and observing "various varicosities or swellings" on the radial fibers. Intrigued, Magini also observed that the size and number of these varicosities increased later in development, and were absent in the adult nervous system. Based on these findings, Magini then hypothesized that these varicosities could be developing neurons. Using a combination Golgi and hematoxylin staining method, Magini was able to identify these varicosities as cells, some of which were very closely associated with the radial fibers.

Additional early works that were important in elucidating the identity and function of radial glia, were completed by Ramón y Cajal, who first suggested that the radial cells were a type of glia through their similarities to astrocytes; and Wilhelm His, who also proposed the idea that growing axons may use radial cells for orientation and guidance during development.

Despite the initial period of interest in radial glia, little additional information was learned about these cells until the electron microscope and immunohistochemistry became available some 60 years later.

== See also ==
- List of distinct cell types in the adult human body
