= Adult neurogenesis =

Generating of neurons from neural stem cells in adults

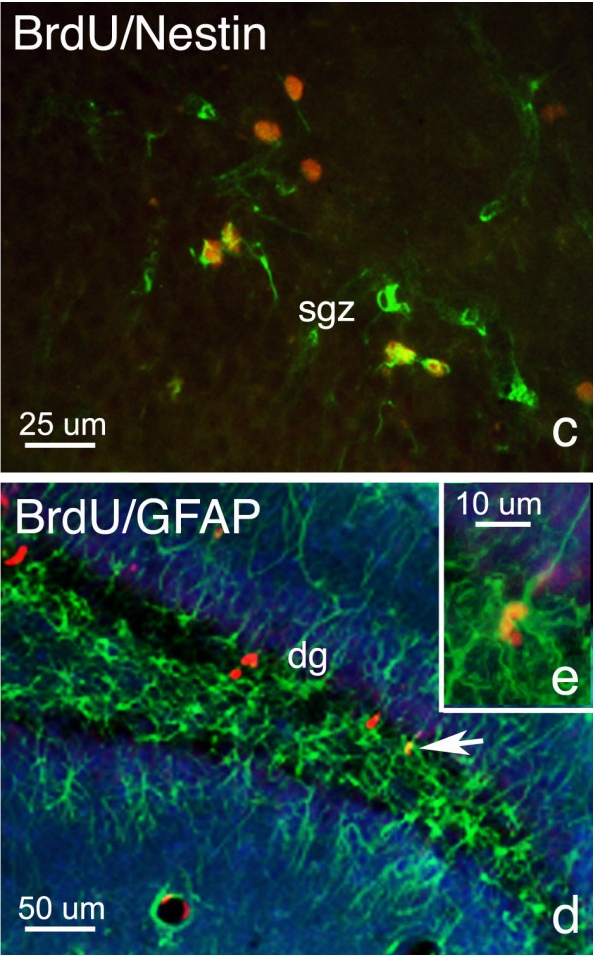
BrdU (red), a marker of DNA replication, highlights neurogenesis in the subgranular zone of hippocampal dentate gyrus. Fragment of an illustration from Faiz et al., 2005.

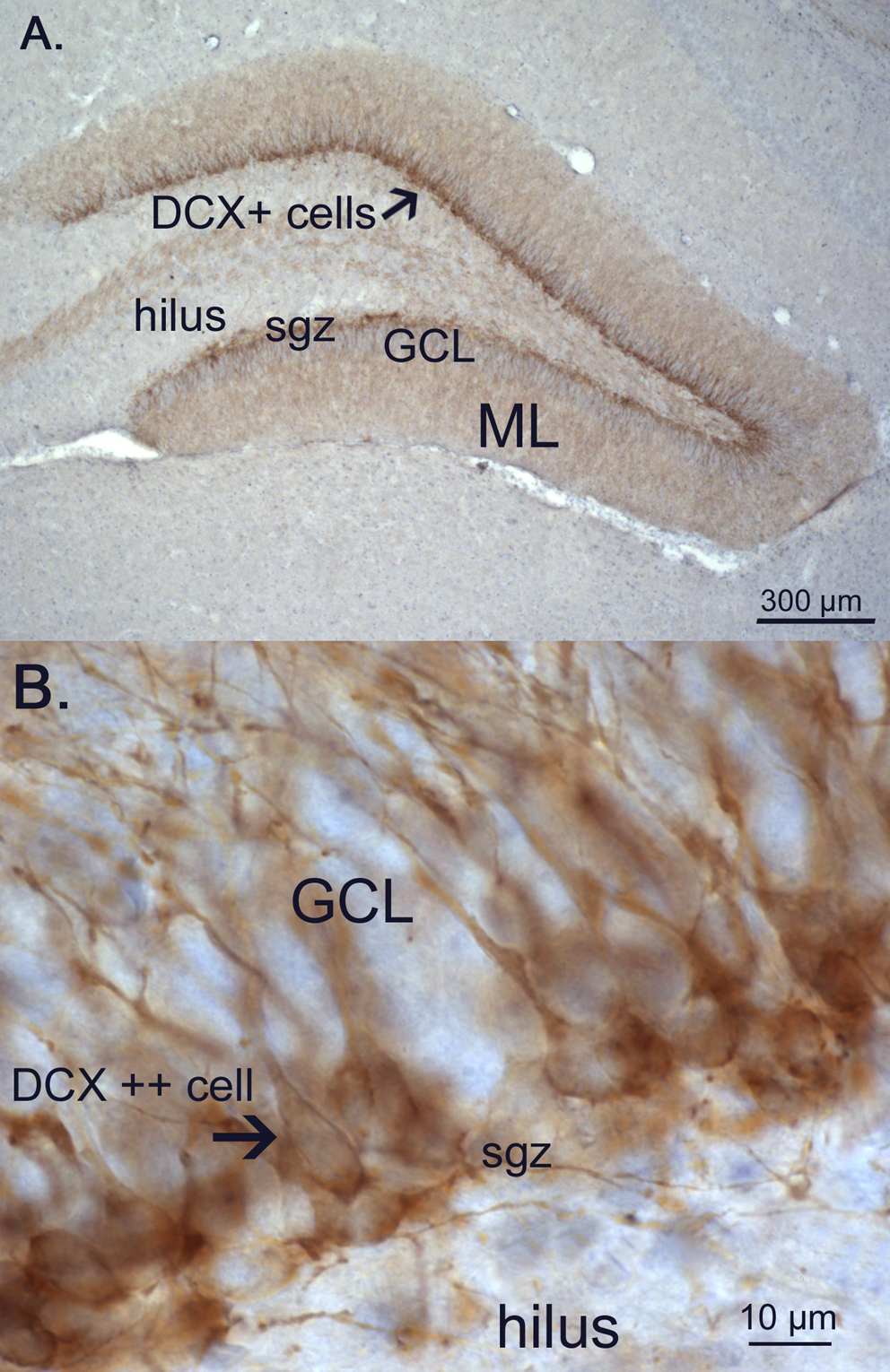
Doublecortin expression in the rat dentate gyrus, 21st postnatal day. Oomen et al., 2009.

Adult neurogenesis is the process in which neurons are generated from neural stem cells in the adult. This process differs from prenatal neurogenesis.

In most mammals, new neurons are born throughout adulthood in two regions of the brain:

- The subgranular zone (SGZ), part of the dentate gyrus of the hippocampus, where neural stem cells give birth to granule cells (implicated in memory formation and learning).
- The subventricular zone (SVZ) of the lateral ventricles, which can be divided into three microdomains: lateral, dorsal and medial. Neural stem cells migrate to the olfactory bulb through the rostral migratory stream where they differentiate into interneurons participating in the sense of smell. In humans, however, few if any olfactory bulb neurons are generated after birth.

More attention has been given to the neurogenesis in the dentate gyrus than in the striatum. In rodents, many of the newborn dentate gyrus neurons die shortly after they are born, but a number of them become functionally integrated into the surrounding brain tissue. Adult neurogenesis in rodents is reported to play a role in learning and memory, emotion, stress, depression, response to injury, and other conditions.

The numbers of neurons born in the human adult hippocampus remains controversial; some studies have reported that in adult humans about 700 new neurons are added in the hippocampus every day, while more recent studies show that adult hippocampal neurogenesis does not exist in humans, or, if it does, it is at undetectable levels. Recent evidence shows that adult neurogenesis is essentially extinct in humans. The experiments advocating for the presence of adult neurogenesis have focused on how dual antigen retrieval finds that DCX antibodies are staining many cells within the adult human dentate gyrus. This finding is not as clear though as supporters of adult neurogenesis suggest; the dentate gyrus cells stained with DCX have been shown to have a mature morphology, contrasting the idea that novel neurons are being generated within the adult brain. The role of new neurons in human adult brain function thus remains unclear.

== Mechanism ==
=== Adult neural stem cells ===
Neural stem cells (NSCs) are the self-renewing, multipotent cells that generate the main phenotypes of the nervous system.

=== Lineage reprogramming (trans-differentiation) ===
Emerging evidence suggests that neural microvascular pericytes, under instruction from resident glial cells, are reprogrammed into interneurons and enrich local neuronal microcircuits. This response is amplified by concomitant angiogenesis.

== Model organisms of neurogenesis ==
=== Planarian ===
Planarian are one of the earliest model organisms used to study regeneration with Pallas as the forefather of planarian studies. Planarian are a classical invertebrate model that in recent decades have been used to examine neurogenesis. The central nervous system of a planarian is simple, though fully formed with two lobes located in the head and two ventral nerve cords. This model reproduces asexually producing a complete and fully functioning nervous system after division allowing for consistent examination of neurogenesis.

=== Axolotl ===
The axolotl is less commonly used than other vertebrates, but is still a classical model for examining regeneration and neurogenesis. Though the axolotl has made its place in biomedical research in terms of limb regeneration, the model organism has displayed a robust ability to generate new neurons following damage. Axolotls have contributed as a bridge organism between invertebrates and mammals, as the species has the regenerative capacity to undergo complete neurogenesis forming a wide range of neuronal populations not limited to a small niche, yet the complexity and architecture is complex and analogous in many ways to human neural development.

=== Zebrafish ===
Zebrafish have long been a classical developmental model due to their transparency during organogenesis and have been utilized heavily in early development neurogenesis. The zebrafish displays a strong neurogenerative capacity capable of regenerating a variety of tissues and complete neuronal diversity (with the exception of astrocytes, as they have yet to be identified within the zebrafish brain) with continued neurogenesis through the life span. In recent decades the model has solidified its role in adult regeneration and neurogenesis following damage. The zebrafish, like the axolotl, has played a key role as a bridge organism between invertebrates and mammals. The zebrafish is a rapidly developing organism that is relatively inexpensive to maintain, while providing the field ease of genetic manipulation and a complex nervous system.

=== Chick ===
Though avians have been used primarily to study early embryonic development, in recent decades the developing chick has played a critical role in the examination of neurogenesis and regeneration as the young chick is capable of neuronal-turnover at a young age, but loses the neurogenerative capacity into adulthood. The loss of neuroregenerative ability over maturation has allowed investigators to further examine genetic regulators of neurogenesis.

=== Rodents ===
Rodents, mice and rats, have been the most prominent model organism since the discovery of modern neurons by Santiago Ramon y Cajal. Rodents have a very similar architecture and a complex nervous system with very little regenerative capacity similar to that found in humans. For that reason, rodents have been heavily used in pre-clinical testing. Rodents display a wide range of neural circuits responsible for complex behaviors making them ideal for studies of dendritic pruning and axonal shearing. While the organism makes for a strong human analog, the model has its limitations not found in the previous models: higher cost of maintenance, lower breeding numbers, and the limited neurogenerative abilities.

To some extent, adult neurogenesis in rodents may be induced by selective disruption of Notch signalling in astrocytes: this produces novel neurons which functionally integrate into the striatal circuit.

Adult neurogenesis in the subventricular zone and dentate gyrus of rodents generates oxidative stress and production of reactive oxygen species that can damage both DNA and lipids. The oxidative stress caused by postnatal neurogenesis may significantly contribute to the reduced learning and memory that occurs with increasing age.

=== Octopus ===
A cephalopod also known as the common octopus, this organism has an intricate nervous system that demonstrates the brain's capacity to produce new cells. In this case and in other taxa when compared, these organisms adapt to unpredictable environments by using newly formed brain cells. This is over a short life-span (female about one year) where wild common octopuses focus most of their energy on mating and offspring care. Findings suggest that the octopus vulgaris like other short-lived species have a complex hippocampal proliferation, needed for spatial/navigation, and short and long-term memory.

=== Chickadees ===
Black-capped chickadees are a well-known model species in the field of neuroscience for their neural mechanisms in song vocalization, plasticity, and memory. Black-capped chickadees are different from other species in the larger group of songbirds because they are characterized by food-caching behaviors. Due to this behavior, chickadees can be described through their remarkable spatial memory. Seasonal changes in hippocampal densities have been described since 1994 where neuronal survival peaks during the fall (October), measured by thymidine (see tracking neurogenesis below) labeled cells, weeks after injection. When compared to non-food caching birds such as the house sparrow, chickadees had significantly more hippocampal neuron recruitment from fall to spring. The changes in hippocampal density is directly associated with increased hoarding behavior, especially during the winter when better spatial memory maximizes their survival.

Over the 2 decades since the initial discovery, the specific role of chickadee hippocampus in memory has gained wide attention. In an experimental setting, hippocampal lesions affect memory for locations, validating previous notions for this specific role. Further, experimentally inhibiting neuronal proliferation decreases scores on spatial memory tasks, supporting that new neurons hold the same role as pre-existing ones. The specific function of the hippocampus, coupled with seasonal changes in their volume, point towards their temporary advantages for spatial memory consolidation. Taken all together, adult neurogenesis in the hippocampus of black-capped chickadees suggest a selective mechanisms for neuronal survival in direct correlation with seasonal food caching behavior.

Developmentally, progenitor cells called radial glial cells are thought to mitigate newly born neurons to their destinations. Radial glial cells extend processes from their soma in the avian ventricular zone to the parenchyma of the adult forebrain. These new neurons have been observed as early as 3 days after thymidine administration in the HVC and as early as 7 days before reaching the hippocampus. Avian migration of new neurons are analogous to mammalian species, providing a future direction in exploring neurogenesis in mammalian species and beyond. However, captivity has been shown to reduce hippocampal volumes when compared to wild counterparts. Reduced neurogenesis in captive birds may be caused by stress, lack of exercise, diminished social interaction, and limited caching opportunities.

== Tracking neurogenesis ==
The creation of new functional neurons can be measured in several ways, summarized in the following sections.

=== DNA labelling ===
Labelled DNA can trace dividing cell's lineage, and determine the location of its daughter cells. A nucleic acid analog is inserted into the genome of a neuron-generating cell (such as a glial cell or neural stem cell). Thymine analogs (3H) thymidine and BrdU are commonly used DNA labels, and are used for radiolabelling and immunohistochemistry respectively.

=== Fate determination via neuronal lineage markers ===
DNA labeling can be used in conjunction with neuronal lineage markers to determine the fate of new functional brain cells. First, incorporated labeled nucleotides are used to detect the populations of newly divided daughter cells. Specific cell types are then determined with unique differences in their expression of proteins, which can be used as antigens in an immunoassay. For example, NeuN/Fox3 and GFAP are antigens commonly used to detect neurons, glia, and ependymal cells. Ki67 is the most commonly used antigen to detect cell proliferation. Some antigens can be used to measure specific stem cell stages. For example, stem cells requires the sox2 gene to maintain pluripotency and is used to detect enduring concentrations of stem cells in CNS tissue. The protein nestin is an intermediate filament, which is essential for the radial growth of axons, and is therefore used to detect the formation of new synapses.

=== Cre-Lox recombination ===
Some genetic tracing studies utilize cre-lox recombination to bind a promoter to a reporter gene, such as lacZ or GFP gene. This method can be used for long term quantification of cell division and labeling, whereas the previously mentioned procedures are only useful for short-term quantification.

=== Viral vectors ===
It has recently become more common to use recombinant viruses to insert the genetic information encoding specific markers (usually protein fluorophores such as GFP) that are only expressed in cells of a certain kind. The marker gene is inserted downstream of a promoter, leading to transcription of that marker only in cells containing the transcription factor(s) that bind to that promoter. For example, a recombinant plasmid may contain the promoter for doublecortin, a protein expressed predominantly by neurons, upstream of a sequence coding for GFP, thereby making infected cells fluoresce green upon exposure to light in the blue to ultraviolet range while leaving non doublecortin expressing cells unaffected, even if they contain the plasmid. Many cells will contain multiple copies of the plasmid and the fluorophore itself, allowing the fluorescent properties to be transferred along an infected cell's lineage.

By labeling a cell that gives rise to neurons, such as a neural stem cells or neural precursor cells, one can track the creation, proliferation, and even migration of newly created neurons. While the plasmid is stable for long periods of time, its protein products may have highly variable half lives and their fluorescence may decrease as well as become too diluted to be seen depending on the number of round of replication they have undergone, making this method more useful for tracking self-similar neural precursor or neural stem cells rather than neurons themselves. The insertion of genetic material via a viral vector tends to be sporadic and infrequent relative to the total number of cells in a given region of tissue, making quantification of cell division inaccurate. However, the above method can provide highly accurate data with respect to when a cell was born as well as full cellular morphologies.

== Methods for inhibiting neurogenesis ==
Many studies analyzing the role of adult neurogenesis utilize a method of inhibiting cell proliferation in specific brain regions, mimicking an inhibition of neurogenesis, to observe the effects on behavior.

=== Pharmacological inhibition ===
Pharmacological inhibition is widely used in various studies, as it provides many benefits. It is generally inexpensive as compared to other methods, such as irradiation, can be used on various species, and does not require any invasive procedures or surgeries for the subjects.

However, it does pose certain challenges, as these inhibitors can't be used to inhibit proliferation in specific regions, thus leading to nonspecific effects from other systems being affected. To avoid these effects, more work must be done to determine optimal doses in order to minimize the effects on systems unrelated to neurogenesis.

A common pharmacological inhibitor for adult neurogenesis is methylazoxymethanol acetate (MAM), a chemotherapeutic agent. Other cell division inhibitors commonly used in studies are cytarabine and temozolomide.

=== Pharmacogenetics ===
Another method used to study the effects of adult neurogenesis is using pharmacogenetic models. These models provide different benefits from the pharmacological route, as it allows for more specificity by targeting specific precursors to neurogenesis and specific stem cell promoters. It also allows for temporal specificity with the interaction of certain drugs. This is beneficial in looking specifically at neurogenesis in adulthood, after normal development of other regions in the brain.

The herpes simplex virus thymidine kinase (HSV-TK) has been used in studies in conjunction with antiviral drugs to inhibit adult neurogenesis. It works by targeting stem cells using glial fibrillary acidic proteins and nestin expression. These targeted stem cells undergo cell death instead of cell proliferation when exposed to antiviral drugs.

Cre protein is also commonly used in targeting stem cells that will undergo gene changes upon treatment with tamoxifen.

=== Irradiation ===
Irradiation, the process of exposing parts of something or someone to radiation, is a method that allows for very specific inhibition of adult neurogenesis. It can be targeted to the brain to avoid affecting other systems and having nonspecific effects. It can even be used to target specific brain regions, which is important in determining how adult neurogenesis in different areas of the brain affects behavior.

Irradiation has previously been tested in adult rats, with no significant changes in cognition having been reported. However, neurogenesis in this study was stopped from progressing when the irradiation was specifically directed towards the hippocampus.

However, irradiation is more expensive than the other methods and also requires large equipment with trained individuals.

== Inhibition of adult neurogenesis in the hippocampus ==
Many studies have observed how inhibiting adult neurogenesis in other mammals, such as rats and mice, affects their behavior. Inhibition of adult neurogenesis in the hippocampus has been shown to have various effects on learning and memory, conditioning, and investigative behaviors.

Impaired fear conditioning has been seen in studies involving rats with a lack of adult neurogenesis in the hippocampus. Inhibition of adult neurogenesis in the hippocampus has also been linked to changes in behavior in tasks involving investigation. Rats also show decreased contextualized freezing behaviors in response to contextualized fear and impairment in learning spatial locations when lacking adult neurogenesis.

=== Effects on pattern separation ===
The changes in learning and memory seen in the studies mentioned previously are thought to be related to the role of adult neurogenesis in regulating pattern separation. Pattern separation is defined as "a process to remove redundancy from similar inputs so that events can be separated from each other and interference can be reduced, and in addition can produce a more orthogonal, sparse, and categorized set of outputs."

This impairment in pattern separation could explain the impairments seen in other learning and memory tasks. A decreased ability in reducing interference could lead to greater difficulty in forming and retaining new memories, although it's hard to discriminate between effects of neurogenesis in learning and pattern separation due to limitations in the interpretation of behavioral results.

Studies show that rats with inhibited adult neurogenesis demonstrate difficulty in differentiating and learning contextualized fear conditioning. Rats with blocked adult neurogenesis also show impaired differential freezing when they are required to differentiate between similar contexts. This also affects their spatial recognition in radial arm maze tests when the arms are closer together rather than when they are further apart. A meta-analysis of behavioral studies evaluating the effect of neurogenesis in different pattern separation tests has shown a consistent effect of neurogenesis ablation on performance, although there are exceptions in the literature.

=== Effects on behavioral inhibition ===
Behavioral inhibition is important in rats and other animals in halting whatever they are currently doing in order to reassess a situation in response to a threat or anything else that may require their attention.

Rats with lesioned hippocampi show less behavioral inhibition when exposed to threats, such as cat odor. The disruption of normal cell proliferation and development of the dentate gyrus in developing rats also impairs their freezing response, which is an example of behavior inhibition, when exposed to an unfamiliar adult male rat.

This impairment in behavioral inhibition also ties into the process of learning and memory, as repressing wrong answers or behaviors requires the ability to inhibit that response.

== Implications ==
=== Role in learning ===
The functional relevance of adult neurogenesis is uncertain, but there is some evidence that hippocampal adult neurogenesis is important for learning and memory. Multiple mechanisms for the relationship between increased neurogenesis and improved cognition have been suggested, including computational theories to demonstrate that new neurons increase memory capacity, reduce interference between memories, or add information about time to memories. Given that the rate of the neurogenesis does not change substantially during the adulthood, it has been proposed that unique episodic memories can be created by simply relying on the increased capacity of the young neurons of a particular age to establish stable new synapses with peers representing the unique features of an event to be memorized Experiments aimed at ablating neurogenesis have proven inconclusive, but several studies have proposed neurogenic-dependence in some types of learning, and others seeing no effect. Studies have demonstrated that the act of learning itself is associated with increased neuronal survival. However, the overall findings that adult neurogenesis is important for any kind of learning are equivocal.

=== Alzheimer's disease ===
Some studies suggest that decreased hippocampal neurogenesis can lead to development of Alzheimer's disease (AD). Yet, others hypothesize that AD patients have increased neurogenesis in the CA1 region of Ammon's horn (the principal region of AD hippocampal pathology) in order to compensate for neuronal loss. While the exact nature of the relationship between neurogenesis and Alzheimer's disease is unknown, insulin-like growth factor 1-stimulated neurogenesis produces major changes in hippocampal plasticity and seems to be involved in Alzheimer's pathology. Allopregnanolone, a neurosteroid, aids the continued neurogenesis in the brain. Levels of allopregnanolone in the brain decline in old age and Alzheimer's disease. Allopregnanolone has been shown through reversing impairment of neurogenesis to reverse the cognitive deficits in a mouse model of Alzheimer's disease. Eph receptors and ephrin signaling have been shown to regulate adult neurogenesis in the hippocampus and have been studied as potential targets to treat some symptoms of AD. Molecules associated with the pathology of AD, including ApoE, PS1 and APP, have also been found to impact adult neurogenesis in the hippocampus.

=== Schizophrenia ===
Studies suggest that people with schizophrenia have a reduced hippocampus volume, which is believed to be caused by a reduction of adult neurogenesis. Correspondingly, this phenomenon might be the underlying cause of many of the symptoms of the disease. Furthermore, several research papers referred to four genes, dystrobrevin binding protein 1 (DTNBP1), neuregulin 1 (NRG1), disrupted in schizophrenia 1 (DISC1), and neuregulin 1 receptor (ERBB4), as being possibly responsible for this deficit in the normal regeneration of neurons. Similarities between depression and schizophrenia suggest a possible biological link between the two diseases. However, further research must be done in order to clearly demonstrate this relationship.

=== Stress and depression ===
Many now believe stress to be the most significant factor for the onset of depression. As discussed above, hippocampal cells are sensitive to stress which can lead to decreased neurogenesis. This area is being considered more frequently when examining the causes and treatments of depression. Studies have shown that removing the adrenal gland in rats caused increased neurogenesis in the dentate gyrus. The adrenal gland is responsible for producing cortisol in response to a stressor, a substance that when produced in chronic amounts causes the down regulation of serotonin receptors and suppresses the birth of neurons. It was shown in the same study that administration of corticosterone to normal animals suppressed neurogenesis, the opposite effect. The most typical class of antidepressants administered for this disease are selective serotonin reuptake inhibitors (SSRIs) and their efficacy may be explained by neurogenesis. In a normal brain, an increase in serotonin causes suppression of the corticotropin-releasing hormone (CRH) through connection to the hippocampus. It directly acts on the paraventricular nucleus to decrease CRH release and down regulate norepinephrine functioning in the locus coeruleus. Because CRH is being repressed, the decrease in neurogenesis that is associated with elevated levels of it is also being reversed. This allows for the production of more brain cells, in particular at the 5-HT1a receptor in the dentate gyrus of the hippocampus which has been shown to improve symptoms of depression. It normally takes neurons approximately three to six weeks to mature, which is approximately the same amount of time it takes for SSRIs to take effect. This correlation strengthens the hypothesis that SSRIs act through neurogenesis to decrease the symptoms of depression. Some neuroscientists have expressed skepticism that neurogenesis is functionally significant, given that a tiny number of nascent neurons are actually integrated into existing neural circuitry. However, a recent study used the irradiation of nascent hippocampal neurons in non-human primates (NHP) to demonstrate that neurogenesis is required for antidepressant efficacy.

Adult-born neurons appear to have a role in the regulation of stress. Studies have linked neurogenesis to the beneficial actions of specific antidepressants, suggesting a connection between decreased hippocampal neurogenesis and depression. In a pioneer study, scientists demonstrated that the behavioral benefits of antidepressant administration in mice is reversed when neurogenesis is prevented with x-irradiation techniques. In fact, newborn neurons are more excitable than older neurons due to a differential expression of GABA receptors. A plausible model, therefore, is that these neurons augment the role of the hippocampus in the negative feedback mechanism of the HPA-axis (physiological stress) and perhaps in inhibiting the amygdala (the region of brain responsible for fearful responses to stimuli). Indeed, suppression of adult neurogenesis can lead to an increased HPA-axis stress response in mildly stressful situations. This is consistent with numerous findings linking stress-relieving activities (learning, exposure to a new yet benign environment, and exercise) to increased levels of neurogenesis, as well as the observation that animals exposed to physiological stress (cortisol) or psychological stress (e.g. isolation) show markedly decreased levels of newborn neurons. Under chronic stress conditions, the elevation of newborn neurons by antidepressants improves the hippocampal-dependent control on the stress response; without newborn neurons, antidepressants are unable to restore the regulation of the stress response and recovery becomes impossible.

Some studies have hypothesized that learning and memory are linked to depression, and that neurogenesis may promote neuroplasticity. One study proposes that mood may be regulated, at a base level, by plasticity, and thus not chemistry. Accordingly, the effects of antidepressant treatment would only be secondary to change in plasticity. However another study has demonstrated an interaction between antidepressants and plasticity; the antidepressant fluoxetine has been shown to restore plasticity in the adult rat brain. The results of this study imply that instead of being secondary to changes in plasticity, antidepressant therapy could promote it.

=== Major depressive disorder ===
Research indicates that adult hippocampal neurogenesis is inversely related to major depressive disorder (MDD). Neurogenesis is decreased in the hippocampus of animal models of major depressive disorder, and many treatments for the disorder, including antidepressant medication and electroconvulsive therapy, increase hippocampal neurogenesis. It has been theorized that decreased hippocampal neurogenesis in individuals with major depressive disorder may be related to the high levels of stress hormones called glucocorticoids, which are also associated with the disorder. The hippocampus instructs the hypothalamic-pituitary-adrenal axis to produce fewer glucocorticoids when glucocorticoid levels are high. A malfunctioning hippocampus, therefore, might explain the chronically high glucocorticoid levels in individuals with major depressive disorder. However, some studies have indicated that hippocampal neurogenesis is not lower in individuals with major depressive disorder and that blood glucocorticoid levels do not change when hippocampal neurogenesis changes, so the associations are still uncertain.

=== Parkinson's disease ===
Parkinson's disease is a neurodegenerative disorder characterized by a progressive loss of dopaminergic neurons in the substantia nigra. Transplantation of fetal dopaminergic precursor cells has paved the way for the possibility of a cell replacement therapy that could ameliorate clinical symptoms in affected patients. In recent years, scientists have provided evidence for the existence of neural stem cells with the potential to produce new neurons, particularly of a dopaminergic phenotype, in the adult mammalian brain. Experimental depletion of dopamine in rodents decreases precursor cell proliferation in both the subependymal zone and the subgranular zone. Proliferation is restored completely by a selective agonist of D2-like (D2L) receptors. Neural stem cells have been identified in the neurogenic brain regions, where neurogenesis is constitutively ongoing, but also in the non-neurogenic zones, such as the midbrain and the striatum, where neurogenesis is not thought to occur under normal physiological conditions. Newer research has shown that there in fact is neurogenesis in the striatum. A detailed understanding of the factors governing adult neural stem cells in vivo may ultimately lead to elegant cell therapies for neurodegenerative disorders such as Parkinson's disease by mobilizing autologous endogenous neural stem cells to replace degenerated neurons.

=== Traumatic brain injury ===
Traumatic brain injuries vary in their mechanism of injury, producing a blunt or penetrating trauma resulting in a primary and secondary injury with excitotoxicity and relatively wide spread neuronal death. Due to the overwhelming number of traumatic brain injuries as a result of the war on terror, tremendous amounts of research have been placed towards a better understanding of the pathophysiology of traumatic brain injuries as well as neuroprotective interventions and possible interventions prompting restorative neurogenesis. Hormonal interventions, such as progesterone, estrogen, and allopregnanolone have been examined heavily in recent decades as possible neuroprotective agents following traumatic brain injuries to reduce the inflammation response stunt neuronal death. In rodents, lacking the regenerative capacity for adult neurogenesis, the activation of stem cells following administration of α7 nicotinic acetylcholine receptor agonist, PNU-282987, has been identified in damaged retinas with follow-up work examining activation of neurogenesis in mammals after traumatic brain injury. Currently, there is no medical intervention that has passed phase-III clinical trials for use in the human population.

=== Effects of sleep reduction ===
One study has linked lack of sleep to a reduction in rodent hippocampal neurogenesis. The proposed mechanism for the observed decrease was increased levels of glucocorticoids. It was shown that two weeks of sleep deprivation acted as a neurogenesis-inhibitor, which was reversed after return of normal sleep and even shifted to a temporary increase in normal cell proliferation. More precisely, when levels of corticosterone are elevated, sleep deprivation inhibits this process. Nonetheless, normal levels of neurogenesis after chronic sleep deprivation return after 2 weeks, with a temporary increase of neurogenesis. While this is recognized, overlooked is the blood glucose demand exhibited during temporary diabetic hypoglycemic states. The American Diabetes Association amongst many documents the pseudosenilia and agitation found during temporary hypoglycemic states. Much more clinical documentation is needed to competently demonstrate the link between decreased hematologic glucose and neuronal activity and mood.

On the other hand, short-term sleep deprivation is known to have an antidepressant effect in humans. In animal models, it increases adult neurogenesis and reduces depression-like behavior.

== Factors affecting ==
=== Changes in old age ===
Neurogenesis is substantially reduced in the hippocampus of aged animals, raising the possibility that it may be linked to age-related declines in hippocampal function. For example, the rate of neurogenesis in aged animals is predictive of memory. However, new born cells in aged animals are functionally integrated. Given that neurogenesis occurs throughout life, it might be expected that the hippocampus would steadily increase in size during adulthood, and that therefore the number of granule cells would be increased in aged animals. However, this is not the case, indicating that proliferation is balanced by cell death. Thus, it is not the addition of new neurons into the hippocampus that seems to be linked to hippocampal functions, but rather the rate of turnover of granule cells.

=== Effects of exercise ===
Scientists have shown that physical activity in the form of voluntary exercise results in an increase in the number of newborn neurons in the hippocampus of mice and rats. These and other studies have shown that learning in both species can be enhanced by physical exercise. Recent research has shown that brain-derived neurotrophic factor and insulin-like growth factor 1 are key mediators of exercise-induced neurogenesis. Exercise increases the production of BDNF, as well as the NR2B subunit of the NMDA receptor. Exercise increases the uptake of IGF-1 from the bloodstream into various brain regions, including the hippocampus. In addition, IGF-1 alters c-fos expression in the hippocampus. When IGF-1 is blocked, exercise no longer induces neurogenesis. Other research demonstrated that exercising mice that did not produce beta-endorphin, a mood-elevating hormone, had no change in neurogenesis. Yet, mice that did produce this hormone, along with exercise, exhibited an increase in newborn cells and their rate of survival. While the association between exercise-mediated neurogenesis and enhancement of learning remains unclear, this study could have strong implications in the fields of aging and/or Alzheimer's disease.

=== Effects of cannabinoids ===
Some studies have shown that the stimulation of the cannabinoids results in the growth of new nerve cells in the hippocampus from both embryonic and adult stem cells. In 2005 a clinical study of rats at the University of Saskatchewan showed regeneration of nerve cells in the hippocampus. Studies have shown that a synthetic drug resembling THC, the main psychoactive ingredient in marijuana, provides some protection against brain inflammation, which might result in better memory at an older age. This is due to receptors in the system that can also influence the production of new neurons. Nonetheless, a study directed at Rutgers University demonstrated how synchronization of action potentials in the hippocampus of rats was altered after THC administration. Lack of synchronization corresponded with impaired performance in a standard test of memory. Recent studies indicate that a natural cannabinoid of cannabis, cannabidiol (CBD), increases adult neurogenesis while having no effect on learning. THC however impaired learning and had no effect on neurogenesis. A greater CBD to THC ratio in hair analyses of cannabis users correlates with protection against gray matter reduction in the right hippocampus. CBD has also been observed to attenuate the deficits in prose recall and visuo-spatial associative memory of those currently under the influence of cannabis, implying neuroprotective effects against heavy THC exposure. Neurogenesis might play a role in its neuroprotective effects, but further research is required.

A few studies have reported a positive association between THC and hippocampal neurogenesis. Some of them hypotethize a biphasic effect, some of them express that part of the negative effects could be attributable to neuroadaptation due to exposure at a specific period of life, and that it could be reversed.

== Regulation ==
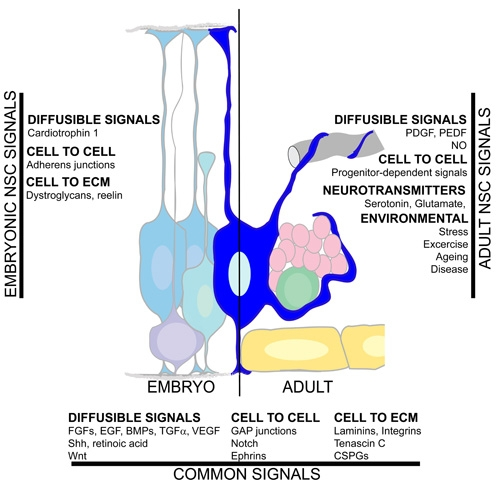
Summary of the signalling pathways in the neural stem cell microenvironment.

Many factors may affect the rate of hippocampal neurogenesis. Exercise and an enriched environment have been shown to promote the survival of neurons and the successful integration of newborn cells into the existing hippocampus. Another factor is central nervous system injury since neurogenesis occurs after cerebral ischemia, epileptic seizures, and bacterial meningitis. On the other hand, conditions such as chronic stress, viral infection and aging can result in a decreased neuronal proliferation. Circulating factors within the blood may reduce neurogenesis. In healthy aging humans, the plasma and cerebrospinal fluid levels of certain chemokines are elevated. In a mouse model, plasma levels of these chemokines correlate with reduced neurogenesis, suggesting that neurogenesis may be modulated by certain global age-dependent systemic changes. These chemokines include CCL11, CCL2 and CCL12, which are highly localized on mouse and human chromosomes, implicating a genetic locus in aging. Another study implicated the cytokine, IL-1beta, which is produced by glia. That study found that blocking IL-1 could partially prevent the severe impairment of neurogenesis caused by a viral infection.

Epigenetic regulation also plays a large role in neurogenesis. DNA methylation is critical in the fate-determination of adult neural stem cells in the subventricular zone for post-natal neurogenesis through the regulation of neuronic genes such as Dlx2, Neurog2, and Sp8. Many microRNAs such as miR-124 and miR-9 have been shown to influence cortical size and layering during development.

ephrin-A2 and ephrin-A3 have been shown to negatively regulate adult neurogenesis.

== History ==
Early neuroanatomists, including Santiago Ramón y Cajal, considered the nervous system fixed and incapable of regeneration. The first evidence of adult mammalian neurogenesis in the cerebral cortex was presented by Joseph Altman in 1962, followed by a demonstration of adult neurogenesis in the dentate gyrus of the hippocampus in 1963. In 1969, Joseph Altman discovered and named the rostral migratory stream as the source of adult generated granule cell neurons in the olfactory bulb. Up until the 1980s, the scientific community ignored these findings despite use of the most direct method of demonstrating cell proliferation in the early studies, i.e. 3H-thymidine autoradiography. By that time, Shirley Bayer (and Michael Kaplan) again showed that adult neurogenesis exists in mammals (rats), and Nottebohm showed the same phenomenon in birds sparking renewed interest in the topic. Studies in the 1990s finally put research on adult neurogenesis into a mainstream pursuit. Also in the early 1990s hippocampal neurogenesis was demonstrated in non-human primates and humans. More recently, neurogenesis in the cerebellum of adult rabbits has also been characterized. Further, some authors (particularly Elizabeth Gould) have suggested that adult neurogenesis may also occur in regions within the brain not generally associated with neurogenesis including the neocortex. However, others have questioned the scientific evidence of these findings, arguing that the new cells may be of glial origin. Recent research has elucidated the regulatory effect of GABA on neural stem cells. GABA's well-known inhibitory effects across the brain also affect the local circuitry that triggers a stem cell to become dormant. They found that diazepam (Valium) has a similar effect.

== See also ==
- Artificial neural membrane
- Neural development
- Neuroplasticity
- Neurotrophin
- Neurulation
- Gliogenesis
- Adult neurogenesis in songbirds
