= Elizabeth Gould (neuroscientist) =

American neuroscientist (born 1962)

- Born: 1962 (age 63–64); New York
- Education: UCLA
- Scientific career
- Fields: Neuroscience
- Workplaces: Princeton University

Elizabeth Gould (born 1962) is an American neuroscientist and the Dorman T. Warren Professor of Psychology at Princeton University. She demonstrated adult neurogenesis in the mammalian hippocampus, and subsequently found evidence for neurogenesis in adult humans that has been challenged by other researchers in the field. In November 2002, Discover magazine listed her as one of the 50 most important women scientists.

Gould discovered evidence of adult neurogenesis in the hippocampus and olfactory bulb of rats, marmosets and macaque monkeys. In her early studies, she laid the groundwork for understanding the relationship between stress and adult neurogenesis. Specifically, she and Dr. Heather A. Cameron reported on adrenal steroid control of adult neurogenesis in rat dentate gyrus. Additionally, her work has provided evidence of neurogenesis in the adult primate neocortex. Gould and the researchers reported new neurons in adult marmoset monkeys are added to three neocortical association areas important in cognitive function: the prefrontal, inferior temporal and posterior parietal cortex. The new neurons appeared to originate in the subventricular zone, where stem cells giving rise to other cell types are located. They then migrate through the white matter to the neocortex, extending axons. Continual addition of neurons in adulthood apparently contributes to association neocortex functions.

== Early life and education ==
Gould was born in 1962 and received her Ph.D. in behavioral neuroscience in 1988 at UCLA.

== Earlier work in neurogenesis ==
In 1989, she joined the lab of Bruce McEwen at Rockefeller University as a postdoctoral researcher investigating the effect of stress hormones on rat brains. Gould's research focused on the death of cells in the hippocampus. While Gould was documenting the degeneration of these brains, she discovered evidence that pointed to the idea that the brain might also heal itself. Confused by this anomaly, Gould assumed she must have been making some simple experimental error, and she went to the Rockefeller library, hoping she could find an explanation as to what she was doing wrong. She ended up looking through numerous papers in the Rockefeller stacks. Several 1962 papers revealed the research at MIT by Joseph Altman claiming that adult rats, cats, and guinea pigs all formed new neurons. Altman's results had been at first ridiculed, then ignored, and quickly forgotten in favor of Pasko Rakic's findings.

Further investigation by Gould revealed that a decade later Michael Kaplan, at the University of New Mexico, had used an electron microscope to image neurons giving birth. Kaplan had, he believed, discovered new neurons everywhere in the mammalian brain, including the cortex. However, other scientists continued to support Rakic's doctrine which denied the possibility of neurogenesis in mammals. Kaplan is reported as remembering Rakic telling him that "Those [cells] may look like neurons in New Mexico, but they don't in New Haven." Like Altman before him, Kaplan abandoned his work in neurogenesis.

Gould spent the next eight years quantifying endless numbers of radioactive rat hippocampi in pursuit of neurogenesis. Gould became a member of the Princeton faculty in 1997. The very next year, in a series of papers, Gould began documenting neurogenesis in primates, directly confronting Rakic's data. She demonstrated that adult marmosets created new neurons in their brains, especially in the olfactory cortex and the hippocampus. By 1999, Rakic admitted that adult neurogenesis was real. To that end he published a paper in the Proceedings of the National Academy of Sciences that reported seeing new neurons in the hippocampus of macaques.

== Current work ==
Gould's laboratory at Princeton studies the production of new neurons in the early postnatal and adult mammalian brain. Her laboratory explores issues related to the regulation of cell production and survival in three brain regions the hippocampus, the olfactory bulb and the neocortex in rodents and primates (marmosets and macaques).

Gould and her colleagues believe the answer to the question, 'What possible function could late-generated cells serve?' could have immense significance in neuroscience and their investigations are guided mostly by this question. Gould and her team are also endeavoring to discover how hormones modulate the production of new neurons and how experience affects new cell production and if so, through what underlying mechanisms.

== Research by Gould and her colleagues ==
=== Hormonal regulation of cell production ===
Gould and her colleagues found that the ovarian steroid estrogen enhances cell proliferation in the dentate gyrus of the adult rat. This effect can be seen following ovariectomy and hormone replacement as well as under naturally occurring changes in hormone levels. They discovered that cell proliferation peaks during proestrus, a time when estrogen levels are highest. Also and conversely, steroid hormones of the adrenal glands were found to inhibit cell proliferation in the dentate gyrus but do so indirectly via an NMDA receptor-dependent mechanism.

=== Experience-dependent changes in neurogenesis ===
Gould's research has shown that exposure of aversive stimuli results in a decrease in cell proliferation in the dentate gyrus of adult rats, tree shrews and marmoset monkeys. Gould and her colleagues have shown that social stress inhibits cell production in these three species in a series of studies. Furthermore, they have discovered that exposure of adult rats to the odors of natural predators, but not other novel odors, suppresses the proliferation of cells in the dentate gyrus. This effect was found to be dependent on adrenal steroids because the prevention of the stress-induced rise in glucocorticoids (by adrenalectomy and replacement with low-dose corticosterone in the drinking water) eliminated the inhibitory effect of fox odor on cell production.

=== The importance of complex environments ===
Gould's team has observed that many new cells in the hippocampus of adult rats and monkeys do not survive in animals living under standard laboratory conditions. In rodents, they discovered that these cells can be rescued by exposing the animals to more complex environments. These results they believe reflect the deprived laboratory conditions in which experimental animals live. This they also suspect is a phenomenon, that is probably, even more pronounced in primates with higher social needs than in rodents. The Gould team is continuing to explore this issue by examining the brains of adult rats living in a visible burrow system and adult monkeys living in semi-naturalistic conditions with opportunities for foraging and other natural activities.

=== The functional role of new neurons ===
Although the function of new neurons in the adult brain is as yet unknown Gould and her colleagues have begun to conjecture possibilities. So many new neurons are generated in the hippocampus and these cells appear to be a sensitive to experience, therefore it seems likely to the Gould team that they participate in hippocampal function. They are exploring the possibility that new neurons participate in two functions of the hippocampus, learning and modulation of the stress response. They have shown that learning enhances the number of new neurons but only under certain conditions. Furthermore, they have discovered, experimental depletion of new neurons is associated with impairment in certain types of learning but not others. A decrease in the number of new neurons following treatment with anti-mitotic drugs impairs trace eye blink conditioning but not spatial learning in a Morris water maze, both hippocampal-dependent tasks.

== Honors and awards ==
Gould received a multitude of awards throughout the duration of her career. From 1989 to 1991, Gould was awarded an NRSA Individual postdoctoral fellowship. From 1991 to 1992, she was awarded the Winston Tri-Institutional (Rockefeller, Cornell, Sloan-Kettering) fellowship. From 1992 to 1993, she was awarded an American Paralysis Association grant. From 1993 to 1994, she was awarded the NIMH RO3 small grant. From 1994 to 1996, she was awarded the NARSAD Young Investigator Award. From 1994 to 1999, she was awarded the NIMH FIRST award. In 2000, she was awarded the National Academy of Sciences Troland Award. In 2006, she was awarded the NARSAD Distinguished Investigator Award. In 2009 she was awarded the Benjamin Franklin Medal by the Royal Society for the encouragement of Arts, Manufactures and Commerce (RSA) for her work on neurogenesis.
