= Synthetic organelles =

Artificial cell compartments

Synthetic organelles, also known as artificial organelles, are artificial compartments designed to mimic the functions of these natural organelles, enabling controlled biochemical reactions within living cells. Organelles provides protection of more fragile cellular components, and is separately enclosed within its own membrane or exists as a spatially distinct functional unit without a surrounding lipid bilayer. Synthetic organelles are designed to mimic the functions of these natural organelles, enabling controlled biochemical reactions within living cells. They can be derived from various sources, including neural stem cells and self-assembling proteins.
