= Neural stem cell =

Precursor cells of neurons and glia during embryonic development

Details
- System: Nervous system

Identifiers
- Latin: cellula nervosa praecursoria
- MeSH: D058953
- TH: H2.00.01.0.00010
- FMA: 86684

A neural stem cell can form into a neuron in the nervous system.

Neural stem cells (NSCs) are self-renewing, multipotent cells that firstly generate the radial glial progenitor cells that generate the neurons and glia of the nervous system of all animals during embryonic development. Some neural progenitor stem cells persist in highly restricted regions in the adult vertebrate brain and continue to produce neurons throughout life. Differences in the size of the central nervous system are among the most important distinctions between the species and thus mutations in the genes that regulate the size of the neural stem cell compartment are among the most important drivers of vertebrate evolution.

Stem cells are characterized by their capacity to differentiate into multiple cell types. They undergo symmetric or asymmetric cell division into two daughter cells. In symmetric cell division, both daughter cells are also stem cells. In asymmetric division, a stem cell produces one stem cell and one specialized cell. NSCs primarily differentiate into neurons, astrocytes, and oligodendrocytes.

== Brain location ==
In the adult mammalian brain, the subgranular zone in the hippocampal dentate gyrus, the subventricular zone around the lateral ventricles, and the hypothalamus (precisely in the dorsal α1, α2 region and the hypothalamic proliferative region, located in the adjacent median eminence) have been reported to contain neural stem cells.

== Development ==
=== In vivo origin ===
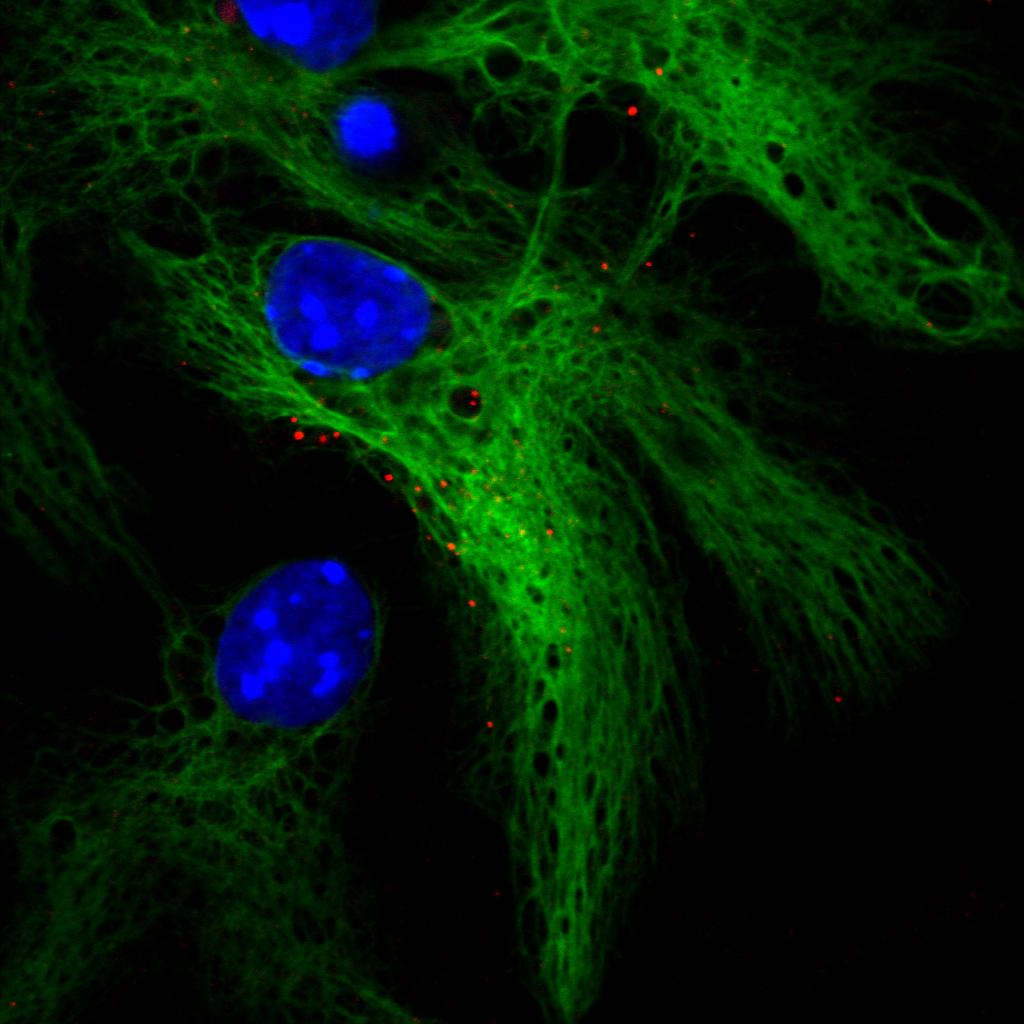
Neural stem cells differentiating to astrocytes (green) and sites of growth hormone receptor shown in red

There are two basic types of stem cell: adult stem cells, which are limited in their ability to differentiate, and embryonic stem cells (ESCs), which are pluripotent and have the capability of differentiating into any cell type.

Neural stem cells are more specialized than ESCs because they only generate radial glial cells that give rise to the neurons and to glia of the central nervous system (CNS). During the embryonic development of vertebrates, NSCs transition into radial glial cells (RGCs) also known as radial glial progenitor cells, (RGPs) and reside in a transient zone called the ventricular zone (VZ). Neurons are generated in large numbers by (RGPs) during a specific period of embryonic development through the process of neurogenesis, and continue to be generated in adult life in restricted regions of the adult brain. Adult NSCs differentiate into new neurons within the adult subventricular zone (SVZ), a remnant of the embryonic germinal neuroepithelium, as well as the dentate gyrus of the hippocampus.

=== In vitro origin ===
Adult NSCs were first isolated from mouse striatum in the early 1990s. They are capable of forming multipotent neurospheres when cultured in vitro. Neurospheres can produce self-renewing and proliferating specialized cells. These neurospheres can differentiate to form the specified neurons, glial cells, and oligodendrocytes. In previous studies, cultured neurospheres have been transplanted into the brains of immunodeficient neonatal mice and have shown engraftment, proliferation, and neural differentiation.

=== Communication and migration ===
NSCs are stimulated to begin differentiation via exogenous cues from the microenvironment, or stem cell niche. Some neural cells are migrated from the SVZ along the rostral migratory stream which contains a marrow-like structure with ependymal cells and astrocytes when stimulated. The ependymal cells and astrocytes form glial tubes used by migrating neuroblasts. The astrocytes in the tubes provide support for the migrating cells as well as insulation from electrical and chemical signals released from surrounding cells. The astrocytes are the primary precursors for rapid cell amplification. The neuroblasts form tight chains and migrate towards the specified site of cell damage to repair or replace neural cells. One example is a neuroblast migrating towards the olfactory bulb to differentiate into periglomercular or granule neurons which have a radial migration pattern rather than a tangential one.

=== Aging ===
Neural stem cell proliferation declines as a consequence of aging. Various approaches have been taken to counteract this age-related decline. Because FOX proteins regulate neural stem cell homeostasis, FOX proteins have been used to protect neural stem cells by inhibiting Wnt signaling.

== Function ==
Epidermal growth factor (EGF) and fibroblast growth factor (FGF) are mitogens that promote neural progenitor and stem cell growth in vitro, though other factors synthesized by the neural progenitor and stem cell populations are also required for optimal growth. It is hypothesized that neurogenesis in the adult brain originates from NSCs. The origin and identity of NSCs in the adult brain remain to be defined.

=== During differentiation ===
The most widely accepted model of an adult NSC is a radial, glial fibrillary acidic protein-positive cell. Quiescent stem cells are Type B that are able to remain in the quiescent state due to the renewable tissue provided by the specific niches composed of blood vessels, astrocytes, microglia, ependymal cells, and extracellular matrix present within the brain. These niches provide nourishment, structural support, and protection for the stem cells until they are activated by external stimuli. Once activated, the Type B cells develop into Type C cells, active proliferating intermediate cells, which then divide into neuroblasts consisting of Type A cells. The undifferentiated neuroblasts form chains that migrate and develop into mature neurons. In the olfactory bulb, they mature into GABAergic granule neurons, while in the hippocampus they mature into dentate granule cells.

==== Epigenetic modification ====
Epigenetic modifications are important regulators of gene expression in differentiating neural stem cells. Key epigenetic modifications include DNA cytosine methylation to form 5-methylcytosine and 5-methylcytosine demethylation. These types of modification are critical for cell fate determination in the developing and adult mammalian brain.

DNA cytosine methylation is catalyzed by DNA methyltransferases (DNMTs). Methylcytosine demethylation is catalyzed in several distinct steps by TET enzymes that carry out oxidative reactions (e.g. 5-methylcytosine to 5-hydroxymethylcytosine) and enzymes of the DNA base excision repair (BER) pathway.

==== Molecular regulation ====
In addition to DNA-level epigenetic mechanisms, regulation of neural stem cell differentiation also involves post-translational modification of transcription factors. For example, acetylation of the transcription factor PAX6 by KAT2A has been shown to promote its ubiquitination and proteasomal degradation, thereby influencing the balance between proliferation and neuronal differentiation.

=== During disease ===
NSCs have an important role during development producing the enormous diversity of neurons, astrocytes and oligodendrocytes in the developing CNS. They also have important role in adult animals, for instance in learning and hippocampal plasticity in the adult mice in addition to supplying neurons to the olfactory bulb in mice.

Notably the role of NSCs during diseases is now being elucidated by several research groups around the world. The responses during stroke, multiple sclerosis, and Parkinson's disease in animal models and humans is part of the current investigation. The results of this ongoing investigation may have future applications to treat human neurological diseases.

Neural stem cells have been shown to engage in migration and replacement of dying neurons in classical experiments performed by Sanjay Magavi and Jeffrey Macklis. Using a laser-induced damage of cortical layers, Magavi showed that SVZ neural progenitors expressing Doublecortin, a critical molecule for migration of neuroblasts, migrated long distances to the area of damage and differentiated into mature neurons expressing NeuN marker. In addition, Masato Nakafuku's group from Japan showed for the first time the role of hippocampal stem cells during stroke in mice. These results demonstrated that NSCs can engage in the adult brain as a result of injury. Furthermore, in 2004 Evan Y. Snyder's group showed that NSCs migrate to brain tumors in a directed fashion. Jaime Imitola, M.D and colleagues from Harvard demonstrated for the first time, a molecular mechanism for the responses of NSCs to injury. They showed that chemokines released during injury such as SDF-1a were responsible for the directed migration of human and mouse NSCs to areas of injury in mice. Since then other molecules have been found to participate in the responses of NSCs to injury. All these results have been widely reproduced and expanded by other investigators joining the classical work of Richard L. Sidman in autoradiography to visualize neurogenesis during development, and neurogenesis in the adult by Joseph Altman in the 1960s, as evidence of the responses of adult NSCs activities and neurogenesis during homeostasis and injury.

The search for additional mechanisms that operate in the injury environment and how they influence the responses of NSCs during acute and chronic disease is matter of intense research.

== Research ==
=== Regenerative therapy of the CNS ===
Cell death is a characteristic of acute CNS disorders as well as neurodegenerative disease. The loss of cells is amplified by the lack of regenerative abilities for cell replacement and repair in the CNS. One way to circumvent this is to use cell replacement therapy via regenerative NSCs. NSCs can be cultured in vitro as neurospheres. These neurospheres are composed of neural stem cells and progenitors (NSPCs) with growth factors such as EGF and FGF. The withdrawal of these growth factors activate differentiation into neurons, astrocytes, or oligodendrocytes which can be transplanted within the brain at the site of injury. The benefits of this therapeutic approach have been examined in Parkinson's disease, Huntington's disease, and multiple sclerosis. NSPCs induce neural repair via intrinsic properties of neuroprotection and immunomodulation. Some possible routes of transplantation include intracerebral transplantation and xenotransplantation.

For neurodegenerative diseases, another transplantation therapy arising in research is the directional induction of neural stem cells. The direct transplantation of NCSs is limited and faces challenges due to low survival rate and irrational differentiation. To overcome the limitations, the direct induction of NCSs aims to manipulate the differentiation of NCS prior to transplantation. Currently NSCs are obtained from primary CNS tissues, the differentiation of pluripotent stem cells (PSC) and transdifferentiation from somatic cells. Induced NCSs can be reprogrammed from somatic cells. Hence, directional induction takes NSCs from different sources and forces them to differentiate into the desired neural lineage cells. An example of the therapeutic usage of this technique is the targeted differentiation of ventral midbrain dopaminergic (DAergenic) neurons into different models of PD. Current therapies for the neurodegenerative disease Parkinson's Disease (PD) include dopamine replacement therapy (DRT). This works to alleviate PD symptoms, but as the disease progresses, the alleviating mechanisms are affected in a nonlinear manner.

An alternative therapeutic approach to the transplantation of NSPCs is the pharmacological activation of endogenous NSPCs (eNSPCs). Activated eNSPCs produce neurotrophic factors, several treatments that activate a pathway that involves the phosphorylation of STAT3 on the serine residue and subsequent elevation of Hes3 expression (STAT3-Ser/Hes3 Signaling Axis) oppose neuronal death and disease progression in models of neurological disorder.

=== Generation of 3D in vitro models of the human CNS ===
Human midbrain-derived neural progenitor cells (hmNPCs) have the ability to differentiate down multiple neural cell lineages that lead to neurospheres as well as multiple neural phenotypes. The hmNPC can be used to develop a 3D in vitro model of the human CNS. There are two ways to culture the hmNPCs, the adherent monolayer and the neurosphere culture systems. The neurosphere culture system has previously been used to isolate and expand CNS stem cells by its ability to aggregate and proliferate hmNPCs under serum-free media conditions as well as with the presence of epidermal growth factor (EGF) and fibroblast growth factor-2 (FGF2). Initially, the hmNPCs were isolated and expanded before performing a 2D differentiation which was used to produce a single-cell suspension. This single-cell suspension helped achieve a homogenous 3D structure of uniform aggregate size. The 3D aggregation formed neurospheres which was used to form an in vitro 3D CNS model.

=== Bioactive scaffolds as traumatic brain injury treatment ===
Traumatic brain injury (TBI) can deform the brain tissue, leading to necrosis primary damage which can then cascade and activate secondary damage such as excitotoxicity, inflammation, ischemia, and the breakdown of the blood-brain-barrier. Damage can escalate and eventually lead to apoptosis or cell death. Current treatments focus on preventing further damage by stabilizing bleeding, decreasing intracranial pressure and inflammation, and inhibiting pro-apoptotic cascades. In order to repair TBI damage, an upcoming therapeutic option involves the use of NSCs derived from the embryonic peri-ventricular region. Stem cells can be cultured in a favorable 3-dimensional, low cytotoxic environment, a hydrogel, that will increase NSC survival when injected into TBI patients. The intracerebrally injected, primed NSCs were seen to migrate to damaged tissue and differentiate into oligodendrocytes or neuronal cells that secreted neuroprotective factors.

=== Galectin-1 in neural stem cells ===
Galectin-1 is expressed in adult NSCs and has been shown to have a physiological role in the treatment of neurological disorders in animal models. There are two approaches to using NSCs as a therapeutic treatment: (1) stimulate intrinsic NSCs to promote proliferation in order to replace injured tissue, and (2) transplant NSCs into the damaged brain area in order to allow the NSCs to restore the tissue. Lentivirus vectors were used to infect human NSCs (hNSCs) with Galectin-1 which were later transplanted into the damaged tissue. The hGal-1-hNSCs induced better and faster brain recovery of the injured tissue as well as a reduction in motor and sensory deficits as compared to only hNSC transplantation.

=== Assays ===
Neural stem cells are routinely studied in vitro using a method referred to as the Neurosphere Assay (or Neurosphere culture system), first developed by Reynolds and Weiss. Neurospheres are intrinsically heterogeneous cellular entities almost entirely formed by a small fraction (1 to 5%) of slowly dividing neural stem cells and by their progeny, a population of fast-dividing nestin-positive progenitor cells. The total number of these progenitors determines the size of a neurosphere and, as a result, disparities in sphere size within different neurosphere populations may reflect alterations in the proliferation, survival and/or differentiation status of their neural progenitors. Indeed, it has been reported that loss of β1-integrin in a neurosphere culture does not significantly affect the capacity of β1-integrin deficient stem cells to form new neurospheres, but it influences the size of the neurosphere: β1-integrin deficient neurospheres were overall smaller due to increased cell death and reduced proliferation.

While the Neurosphere Assay has been the method of choice for isolation, expansion and even the enumeration of neural stem and progenitor cells, several recent publications have highlighted some of the limitations of the neurosphere culture system as a method for determining neural stem cell frequencies. In collaboration with Reynolds, STEMCELL Technologies has developed a collagen-based assay, called the Neural Colony-Forming Cell (NCFC) Assay, for the quantification of neural stem cells. Importantly, this assay allows discrimination between neural stem and progenitor cells.

== History ==
The first evidence that neurogenesis occurs in certain regions of the adult mammalian brain came from [3H]-thymidine labeling studies conducted by Altman and Das in 1965 which showed postnatal hippocampal neurogenesis in young rats. In 1989, Sally Temple described multipotent, self-renewing progenitor and stem cells in the subventricular zone (SVZ) of the mouse brain. In 1992, Brent A. Reynolds and Samuel Weiss were the first to isolate neural progenitor and stem cells from the adult striatal tissue, including the SVZ — one of the neurogenic areas — of adult mice brain tissue. In the same year the team of Constance Cepko and Evan Y. Snyder were the first to isolate multipotent cells from the mouse cerebellum and stably transfected them with the oncogene v-myc. This molecule is one of the genes widely used now to reprogram adult non-stem cells into pluripotent stem cells. Since then, neural progenitor and stem cells have been isolated from various areas of the adult central nervous system, including non-neurogenic areas, such as the spinal cord, and from various species including humans.

== See also ==
- List of human cell types derived from the germ layers
