= Michael Kaplan (biologist) =

Michael S. Kaplan
- Born: January 3, 1952 (age 74); Miami, Florida
- Education: Tulane University; Boston University; Florida State University; University of Miami
- Occupations: Biology researcher; Medical professor; Clinical physician

Michael S. Kaplan (born January 3, 1952) is an American biology researcher, medical professor, and clinical physician.

A pioneer of neurogenesis research, his work refuted the classic idea that no new nerve cells are born in the adult mammalian brain. His research using light and electron microscopy suggested that neurogenesis occurs in the brain of adult mammals, but his findings were rejected by the scientific community at the time in a field that continues to be contentious.

Kaplan has recently begun a YouTube channel which offers patient interviews and insights to brain plasticity.

== Academic background ==
Tulane University, BS in Anatomy, 1975
Boston University, PhD in Neuroscience and Anatomy, 1979
Florida State University, Post-Doc in Anatomy, 1980
University of New Mexico, Anatomy department Faculty, 1983
University of Miami, MD, 1987
Johns Hopkins University Medical School, Residency in Rehabilitation Medicine, 1990
National Institute of Aging, Director of Physical Function and Performance Program, 1991–1992
Johns Hopkins University Medical School, Anesthesiology and Critical Care Medicine fellows Professor, 2000–2005
University of Maryland Medical School, Professor of Anatomy

== Research background ==
Initial studies that suggested that the adult brain could generate new neurons were largely ignored. In the 1960s Joseph Altman and coworkers published a series of papers reporting that some dividing cells in the adult brain survived and differentiated into cells with morphology similar to neurons. They used tritiated thymidine autoradiography to label the cells. Tritiated thymidine is incorporated into the DNA of dividing cells. They found that the highest density of labeling was in the subventricular zone and in the dentate gyrus of the hippocampus. It was known that the dentate gyrus of the hippocampus is essentially devoid of glia. Therefore, Altman attributed the labeling in this region to the uptake of thymidine by dentate granule cells. However, he could not prove that the adult-generated cells were neurons rather than glia, since no phenotypic markers were available that could be used in conjunction with thymidine autoradiography. The absence of specific markers for neurons and glia and continued skepticism surrounding the novel concept of adult neurogenesis limited further development of the research.

In the mid 1970s and the early 1980s, Kaplan and his colleagues reexamined the initial observations using the electron microscope and added substantial confidence that neurogenesis could occur in the adult brain. Combining electron microscopy and tritiated thymidine labeling, they showed that labeled cells in the rat dentate gyrus have ultrastructural characteristics of neurons, such as dendrites and synapses. Although they were able to demonstrate this in repeatable studies in primate cortex, most researchers at the time did not consider this to be evidence of significant neurogenesis in adult mammals.

In addition, the concept that there may be brain stem cells that could proliferate, migrate, and then differentiate into new neurons had not yet been introduced. It was therefore thought that mature neurons would have to replicate, an idea that most researchers found incredible. Furthermore, the possible relevance of the findings for humans was underestimated because there was no evidence of neurogenesis in primates.

== Publications ==
- Kaplan, Michael S, "Zonisamide Provides Relief of Neuropathic Pain and Promotes Weight Loss:" A Retrospective Study Journal of Pain.
- Kaplan, Michael S, Pain Medicine & Management Just the Facts "Rehabilitation Evaluation and Treatment in Patients with Low Back Pain" pp. 325–331, McGraw-Hill, Medical Publishing Division, Wallace, Mark S, & Staats, Peter,(eds). 2005
- Kaplan, MS, Miliman, A, Kaplan, L, "Comparative Clinical Efficacy and Abuse Potential of Oral Long Acting Opioids in a Chronic Pain Outpatient Center, The Journal of Pain, 2004;5 (supp1):75.
- Kaplan, MS, "Environmental Complexity Stimulates Visual Cortex Neurogenesis: Death of a Dogma and a Research Career" Trends in Neurosciences, October, 2001, vol 24, No. 10.
- Specter, Michael, "The New Yorker" Annals of Science; Rethinking the Brain, How the Songs of Canaries Upset a Fundamental Principle of Science. July 23, 2001.
- Kaplan, MS, A Croft, L Cromwell, B Holmes, W. Meeker, T Milus & H Vernon, "Persistent Back Pain Following a Work-Related Injury," Journal of the Neuromusculoskeletal System, Spring, 1993.
- Kaplan, MS, R Erhard, C Fadul, C Lewis & H Vernon, "Woman with Diffuse Chronic Pain Syndrome," Journal of the Neuromusculoskeletal System, Summer, 1994.
- Kaplan, MS, "Reducing the Risk of Falls Among the Elderly," Correspondence in The New England Journal of Medicine, Volume 332, Number 4: 268, January 26, 1995.
- Hendler, NH, Kozikowski, JG, & Kaplan, MS, Thoracic Outlet Syndrome: Comparison of Quantitative Testing with the Clinical Exam (in preparation).
- Kaplan, MS, R. Pratley & WJ Hawkins "Holter Monitoring for the Assessment of Silent Cardiac Ischemia in Cerebrovascular Disease," Archives of Physical Medicine and Rehabilitation vol 72,: 59–61, 1991.
- Anderson, M., MS Kaplan & G. Felsenthal, "Brain Injury Obscured by Chronic Pain," Archives of Physical Medicine and Rehabilitation, vol 71: 703–708, 1990.
- Kaplan, MS & P. Black, "Resident Physician Council Position Paper Regarding Resident Research," submitted, Archives of Physical Medicine and Rehabilitation.
- Kaplan, MS & Casey, M., "Aging of Granule and Pyramidal Neurons in the Rodent Hippocampus," in preparation.
- Kaplan, MS, "Plasticity After Brain Lesions: `Contemporary Concepts'" Archives of Physical Medicine and Rehabilitation, 69: 984–991, 1988.
- Kaplan, MS, and L Doss, "Primary Brain Tumors; A Novel Therapy" (in preparation).
- Kaplan, MS, McNelly, NA & Hinds, JW, "Population Dynamics of Adult formed Granule Neurons of the Rat Olfactory Bulb," Journal of Comparative Neurology, 239: 117–125, 1985.
- Kaplan, MS, "Formation of Neurons in Young and Senescent Animals: An Electron Microscopic and Morphological Analysis," Hope for A New Neurology, vol. 457, 173–192, New York, NY, NY Academy of Sciences, 1985.
- Kaplan, MS, & DH Bell, "Mitotic Neuroblasts in the Nine Day Old and Eleven Month Old Rodent Hippocampus," Journal of Neuroscience, No. 6: 1429–1441, 1984.
- Kaplan, MS & DH Bell, "Neuronal Proliferation in the Nine Month Old Rodent; Radioautographic Study of Granule Cells in the Hippocampus," Experimental Brain Research, 52: 1–5, 1983.
- Kaplan, MS, "Proliferation of Subependymal Cells in the Adult Primate CNS: Differential Uptake of DNA Labeled Precursors," Journal fur Hirnforshcung, 24: 23–33, 1983.
- Kaplan, MS, "Neurogenesis in the Three Month Old Rat Visual Cortex," Journal of Comparative Neurology, 195: 323–338, 1981.
- Graziadei, PP & MS Kaplan, "Regrowth of Olfactory Sensory Axons into Transplanted Neural Tissue," Brain Research, 201: 39–44, 1980.
- Kaplan, MS & JW Hinds, "Gliogenesis of Astrocytes and Oligodendrocytes in the Adult Neocortical Grey and White Matter of the Rat: Electron Microscopic Analysis of Light Radioautographs," Journal of Comparative Neurology, 193: 711–727, 1980.
- Kaplan, MS, "Proliferation of Epithelial Cells in the Adult Primate Choroid Plexus," Anatomical Record, 197: 495–502, 1980.
- Kaplan, MS, "Cell Proliferation in the Adult Mammalian Brain," Thesis, May 1979.
- Kaplan, MS & JW Hinds, "Neurogenesis in the Adult Rat: Electron Microscopic Analysis of Light Radioautographs," Science, 197: 1092–1094, 1977.
