= Subgranular zone =

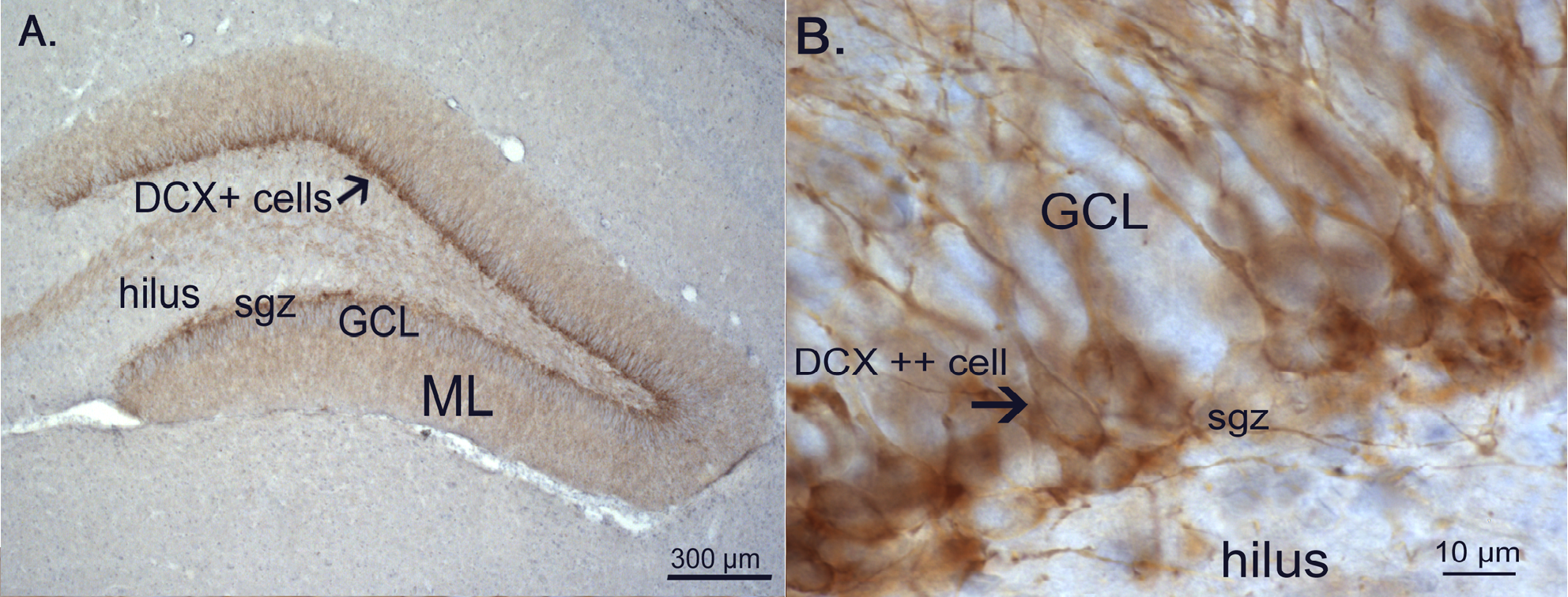
The subgranular zone (in rat brain). (A) Regions of the dentate gyrus: the hilus, subgranular zone (sgz), granule cell layer (GCL), and molecular layer (ML). Cells were stained for doublecortin (DCX), a protein expressed by neuronal precursor cells and immature neurons. (B) Closeup of subgranular zone, located between the hilus and GCL. From a paper by Charlotte A. Oomen, et al., 2009.

The subgranular zone (SGZ) is a layer of cells in the dentate gyrus, in the hippocampal formation, which is a site of adult neurogenesis in the brain.

The other major site of adult neurogenesis in the brain is the subventricular zone.

== Structure ==
The subgranular zone is a narrow layer of cells located between the granule cell layer and hilus of the dentate gyrus. This layer is characterized by several types of cells, the most prominent type being neural stem cells (NSCs) in various stages of development. However, in addition to NSCs, there are also astrocytes, endothelial cells, blood vessels, and other components, which form a microenvironment that supports the NSCs and regulates their proliferation, migration, and differentiation. The discovery of this complex microenvironment and its crucial role in NSC development has led some to label it as a neurogenic "niche". It is also frequently referred to as a vascular, or angiogenic, niche due to the importance and pervasiveness of the blood vessels in the SGZ.

=== Neural stem cells and neurons ===
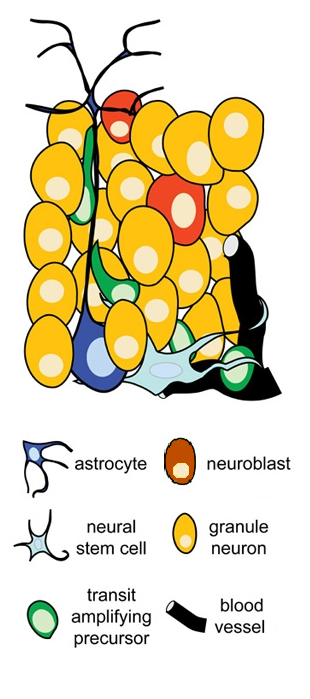
Structure and features of the neurogenic niche. Adapted from a paper by Ilias Kazanis, et al., 2008.

The brain comprises many different types of neurons, but the SGZ generates only one type: granule cells—the primary excitatory neurons in the dentate gyrus (DG)--which are thought to contribute to cognitive functions such as memory and learning. The progression from neural stem cell to granule cell in the SGZ can be described by tracing the following lineage of cell types:

1. Radial glial cells. Radial glial cells are a subset of astrocytes, which are typically thought of as non-neuronal support cells. The radial glial cells in the SGZ have cell bodies that reside in the SGZ and vertical (or radial) processes that extend into the molecular layer of the DG. These processes act as a scaffold upon which newly formed neurons can migrate the short distance from the SGZ to the granule cell layer. Radial glia are astrocytic in their morphology, their expression of glial markers such as GFAP, and their function in regulating the NSC microenvironment. However, unlike most astrocytes, they also act as neurogenic progenitors; in fact, they are widely considered to be the neural stem cells that give rise to subsequent neuronal precursor cells. Studies have shown that radial glia in the SGZ express nestin and Sox2, biomarkers associated with neural stem cells, and that isolated radial glia can generate new neurons in vitro. Radial glial cells often divide asymmetrically, producing one new stem cell and one neuronal precursor cell per division. Thus, they have the capacity for self-renewal, enabling them to maintain the stem cell population while simultaneously producing the subsequent neuronal precursors known as transiently amplifying cells.
2. Transiently amplifying progenitor cells. Transiently amplifying (or transit-amplifying) progenitor cells are highly proliferative cells that frequently divide and multiply via mitosis, thus "amplifying" the pool of available precursor cells. They represent the beginning of a transitory stage in NSC development in which NSCs begin to lose their glial characteristics and assume more neuronal traits. For instance, cells in this category may initially express glial markers like GFAP and stem cell markers such as nestin and Sox2, but eventually, they lose these characteristics and begin expressing markers specific to granule cells such as NeuroD and Prox1. It is thought that the formation of these cells represents a fate-choice in neural stem cell development.
3. Neuroblasts. Neuroblasts represent the last stage of precursor cell development before cells exit the cell cycle and assume their identity as neurons. Proliferation of these cells is more limited, although cerebral ischemia can induce proliferation at this stage.
4. Postmitotic neurons. At this point, after exiting the cell cycle, cells are considered immature neurons. The large majority of postmitotic neurons undergo apoptosis, or cell death. The few that survive begin developing the morphology of hippocampal granule cells, marked by the extension of dendrites into the molecular layer of the DG and the growth of axons into the CA3 region, and subsequently the formation of synaptic connections. Postmitotic neurons also pass through a late maturation phase characterized by increased synaptic plasticity and a decreased threshold for long-term potentiation. Eventually, the neurons are integrated into the hippocampal circuitry as fully matured granule cells.

=== Astrocytes ===
Two main types of astrocytes are found in the SGZ: radial astrocytes and horizontal astrocytes. Radial astrocytes are synonymous with the radial glia cells described earlier and play dual roles as both glial cells and neural stem cells. It is not clear whether individual radial astrocytes can play both roles or only certain radial astrocytes can give rise to NSCs. Horizontal astrocytes do not have radial processes; rather, they extend their processes horizontally, parallel to the border between the hilus and the SGZ. Moreover, they do not appear to generate neuronal progenitors. Because astrocytes are in close contact with many of the other cells in the SGZ, they are well-suited to serve as sensory and regulatory channels in neurogenesis.

=== Endothelial cells and blood vessels ===
Endothelial cells, which line the blood vessels in the SGZ, are a critical component in the regulation of stem cell self-renewal and neurogenesis. These cells, which reside in close proximity to clusters of proliferating neurogenic cells, provide attachment points for neurogenic cells and release diffusible signals such as vascular endothelial growth factor (VEGF) that help induce both angiogenesis and neurogenesis. In fact, studies have shown that neurogenesis and angiogenesis share several common signaling pathways, implying that neurogenic cells and endothelial cells in the SGZ have a reciprocal effect on one another. Blood vessels carry hormones and other molecules that act on the cells in the SGZ to regulate neurogenesis and angiogenesis.

== Hippocampal neurogenesis ==
The main function of the SGZ is to carry out hippocampal neurogenesis, the process by which new neurons are bred and functionally integrated into the granular cell layer of the dentate gyrus. Contrary to long-standing beliefs, neurogenesis in the SGZ occurs not only during prenatal development but throughout adult life in most mammals, including humans.

=== Regulation of neurogenesis ===
The self-renewal, fate-choice, proliferation, migration, and differentiation of neural stem cells in the SGZ are regulated by many signaling molecules in the SGZ, including several neurotransmitters. For example, Notch is a signaling protein that regulates fate-choice, generally maintaining stem cells in a state of self-renewal. Neurotrophins such as brain derived neurotrophic factor (BDNF) and nerve growth factor (NGF) are also present in the SGZ and are presumed to affect neurogenesis, though the exact mechanisms are unclear. Wnt and bone morphogenic protein (BMP) signaling also are neurogenesis regulators, as well as classical neurotransmitters such as glutamate, GABA, dopamine, and serotonin. Neurogenesis in the SGZ is also affected by various environmental factors such as age and stress. Age-related decreases in the rate of neurogenesis are consistently observed in both the laboratory and the clinic, but the most potent environmental inhibitor of neurogenesis in the SGZ is stress. Stressors such as sleep deprivation and psychosocial stress induce the release of glucocorticoids from the adrenal cortex into circulation, which inhibits neural cell proliferation, survival, and differentiation. There is experimental evidence that stress-induced reductions in neurogenesis can be countered with antidepressants. Other environmental factors such as physical exercise and continual learning can also have a positive effect on neurogenesis, stimulating cell proliferation despite increased levels of glucocorticoids in circulation.

=== Role in memory and learning ===
There is a reciprocal relationship between neurogenesis in the SGZ and learning and memory, particularly spatial memory. On the one hand, high rates of neurogenesis may increase memory abilities. For instance, the high rate of neurogenesis and neuronal turnover in young animals may be the reason behind their ability to rapidly acquire new memories and learn new tasks. There is a hypothesis that the constant formation of new neurons is the reason newly acquired memories have a temporal aspect. On the other hand, learning, particularly spatial learning, which depends on the hippocampus, has a positive effect on cell survival and induces cell proliferation through increased synaptic activity and neurotransmitter release. Although more work needs to be done to solidify the relationship between hippocampal neurogenesis and memory, it is clear from cases of hippocampal degeneration that neurogenesis is necessary in order for the brain to cope with changes in the external environment and to produce new memories in a temporally correct manner.

== Clinical significance ==
There are many neurological diseases and disorders that exhibit changes in neurogenesis in the SGZ. However, the mechanisms and significances of these changes are still not fully understood. For example, patients with Parkinson's disease and Alzheimer's disease generally exhibit a decrease in cell proliferation, which is expected. However, those who experience epilepsy, a stroke, or inflammation exhibit increases in neurogenesis, possible evidence of attempts by the brain to repair itself. Further definition of the mechanisms and consequences of these changes may lead to new therapies for these neurological disorders. Insights into neurogenesis in the SGZ may also provide clues in understanding the underlying mechanisms of cancer, since cancer cells exhibit many of the same characteristics of undifferentiated, proliferating precursor cells in the SGZ. Separation of precursor cells from the regulatory microenvironment of the SGZ may be a factor in the formation of cancerous tumors.

== See also ==
- Neurogenesis
- Subventricular zone
- Stem cell niche
