= Ephrin A3 =

Protein found in humans

EFNA3

Identifiers
- Aliases: EFNA3, EFL2, EPLG3, Ehk1-L, LERK3, ephrin A3
- External IDs: OMIM: 601381; MGI: 106644; GeneCards: EFNA3

Gene location (Human)
Chr.	Chromosome 1 (human)
Band	1q21.3	Start	155,078,837 bp
Band	1q21.3	End	155,087,538 bp

Gene location (Mouse)
Chr.	Chromosome 3 (mouse)
Band	3 F1|3 39.06 cM	Start	89,313,899 bp
Band	3 F1|3 39.06 cM	End	89,322,965 bp
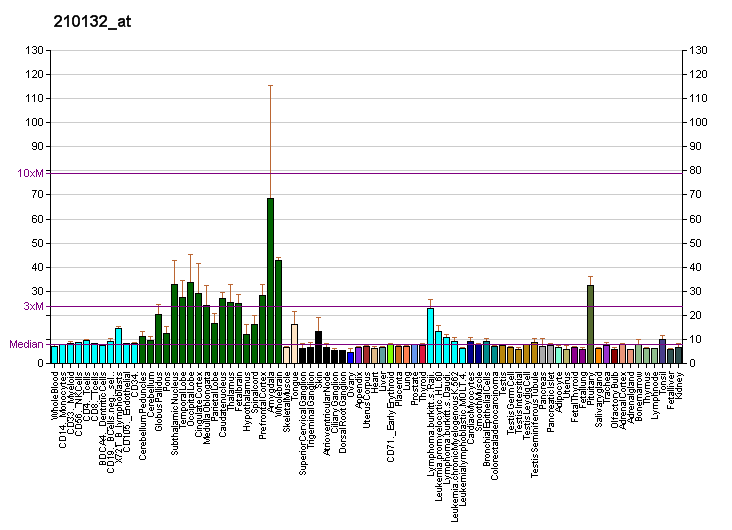
RNA expression pattern
Bgee	Human / Mouse (ortholog); Top expressed in: skin of leg; skin of abdomen; skin of arm; hair follicle; Region I of hippocampus proper; cervix epithelium; orbitofrontal cortex; prefrontal cortex; parotid gland; nucleus accumbens / Top expressed in: lip; perirhinal cortex; entorhinal cortex; chorion; nasal epithelium; olfactory epithelium; subiculum; skin of external ear; dentate gyrus of hippocampal formation granule cell; esophagus; More reference expression data
BioGPS	More reference expression data
Gene ontology
Molecular function	transmembrane-ephrin receptor activity; protein binding; ephrin receptor binding
Cellular component	anchored component of membrane; plasma membrane; integral component of plasma membrane; membrane; intrinsic component of plasma membrane
Biological process	cell-cell signaling; ephrin receptor signaling pathway; axon guidance; negative regulation of angiogenesis; regulation of neuron differentiation; positive regulation of aspartic-type endopeptidase activity involved in amyloid precursor protein catabolic process
Sources:Amigo / QuickGO
Orthologs
Databases	NCBI: entry; OMA: entry
Species	Human	Mouse
Entrez	1944	13638
Ensembl	ENSG00000143590	ENSMUSG00000028039
UniProt	P52797	O08545
RefSeq (mRNA)	NM_004952	NM_010108
RefSeq (protein)	NP_004943	NP_034238; NP_001364045; NP_001364046; NP_001364047; NP_001364048 NP_001364049; NP_001364050
Location (UCSC)	Chr 1: 155.08 – 155.09 Mb	Chr 3: 89.31 – 89.32 Mb
PubMed search
- Wikidata
View/Edit Human	View/Edit Mouse

Ephrin A3 is a protein that in humans is encoded by the EFNA3 gene.

This gene encodes a member of the ephrin (EPH) family. The ephrins and EPH-related receptors comprise the largest subfamily of receptor protein-tyrosine kinases and have been implicated in mediating developmental events, especially in the nervous system and in erythropoiesis. Based on their structures and sequence relationships, ephrins are divided into the ephrin-A (EFNA) class, which are anchored to the membrane by a glycosylphosphatidylinositol linkage, and the ephrin-B (EFNB) class, which are transmembrane proteins. This gene encodes an EFNA class ephrin.
