= CCL12 =

Mammalian protein found in mice

Ccl12

Identifiers
- Aliases: chemokine (C-C motif) ligand 12MCP-5Scya12
- External IDs: GeneCards:

Gene location (Human)
Chr.	Chromosome 11 (human)
Band	11 C|11 49.9 cM	Start	81,992,671 bp
Band	11 C|11 49.9 cM	End	81,994,226 bp
RNA expression pattern
Bgee	Human / Mouse (ortholog); Top expressed in: cervix; right kidney; embryo; thymus; subcutaneous adipose tissue; aortic valve; stroma of bone marrow; dermis; efferent ductule; white adipose tissue / n/a; More reference expression data
BioGPS	n/a
Gene ontology
Molecular function	cytokine activity; CCR2 chemokine receptor binding; chemokine activity; protein kinase activity; phospholipase activator activity; CCR chemokine receptor binding
Cellular component	extracellular region; intracellular anatomical structure; extracellular space
Biological process	negative regulation of neuron apoptotic process; G protein-coupled receptor signaling pathway; protein kinase B signaling; monocyte chemotaxis; astrocyte cell migration; cytokine-mediated signaling pathway; chemokine-mediated signaling pathway; negative regulation of glial cell apoptotic process; cellular response to tumor necrosis factor; negative regulation of natural killer cell chemotaxis; cellular response to organic cyclic compound; neutrophil chemotaxis; MAPK cascade; chemotaxis; positive regulation of GTPase activity; positive regulation of calcium ion import; macrophage chemotaxis; cytoskeleton organization; angiogenesis; immune response; cellular response to interleukin-1; positive regulation of ERK1 and ERK2 cascade; regulation of cell shape; cellular response to interferon-gamma; lymphocyte chemotaxis; inflammatory response; lipopolysaccharide-mediated signaling pathway; regulation of signaling receptor activity; positive regulation of leukocyte migration; negative regulation of leukocyte proliferation; negative regulation of vascular endothelial cell proliferation; negative regulation of G1/S transition of mitotic cell cycle; positive regulation of endothelial cell apoptotic process; calcium ion transport; cellular calcium ion homeostasis; exocytosis; cell-cell signaling; eosinophil chemotaxis
Sources:Amigo / QuickGO
Orthologs
Databases	NCBI: entry; OMA: entry
Species	Human	Mouse
Entrez	20293	n/a
Ensembl	ENSMUSG00000035352	n/a
UniProt	Q62401	n/a
RefSeq (mRNA)	NM_011331	n/a
RefSeq (protein)	NP_035461	n/a
Location (UCSC)	Chr 11: 81.99 – 81.99 Mb	n/a
PubMed search		n/a
- Wikidata
View/Edit Human

Chemokine (C-C motif) ligand 12 (CCL12) is a small cytokine belonging to the CC chemokine family that has been described in mice. It is also known as monocyte chemotactic protein 5 (MCP-5) and, due to its similarity with the human chemokine MCP-1, sometimes it is called MCP-1-related chemokine. CCL12 specifically attracts eosinophils, monocytes and lymphocytes. This chemokine is found predominantly in lymph nodes and thymus under normal conditions, and its expression can be hugely induced in macrophages. It is thought to coordinate cell movements during early allergic reactions, and immune response to pathogens. The gene for CCL12 is found in a cluster of CC chemokines on mouse chromosome 11.
