= Joseph Altman =

American biologist (1925 – 2016)

Joseph Altman (1925 – 2016) was an American biologist who worked in the field of neurobiology.

== First years ==
Born in Hungary to a Jewish family, he survived The Holocaust and migrated with his family via Germany and Australia to the United States. In these places, he sought employment as a librarian and used the opportunity to inform himself reading books about psychology, human behavior, psychoanalysis, and human brain structure. In New York, where he married his first wife Elizabeth Altman, he became a graduate student in psychology in the laboratory of Hans-Lukas Teuber, earning a PhD., in 1959 from New York University. That degree launched his scientific career, first as a postdoctoral fellow at Columbia University, next at the Massachusetts Institute of Technology, and finally at Purdue University. During his career, he collaborated closely with his second wife, Shirley A. Bayer. From the early 1960s to 2016, he published many articles in peer-reviewed journals, books, monographs, and online free books that emphasized developmental processes in brain anatomy and function.

== Discovery of adult neurogenesis ==
Joseph Altman discovered adult neurogenesis, the creation of new neurons in the mammalian adult brain, in the 1960s. His research showed neuronal migration, i.e. the origin of the neocortical neurons from a zone of dividing cells lining the ventricles of the fetal brain and migration from the ventricular zone to the outside cortex along special guides known as the radial glia. Moreover, in 1980, Steven Petersen, Jim Baker, and Joseph Altman have found that most neurons in the zone V4 are very sensitive to the dimensions of the stimulus, with some neurons preferring tiny spots while others preferred long rectangles.(p. 134).

As an independent investigator at MIT, his results were largely ignored, by his account, in favor of Pasko Rakic's findings that neurogenesis is limited to pre-natal development. By the late 1990s, a paradigm shift had occurred. The fact that the mammalian brain can create new neurons even into adulthood was rediscovered by Elizabeth Gould in 1999, leading it to be one of the hottest fields in neuroscience. Adult neurogenesis has recently been proven to occur in the dentate gyrus, olfactory bulb and striatum through the measurement of Carbon-14—the levels of which changed during nuclear bomb testing throughout the 20th century—in postmortem human brains.

== Comparison of species' neurodevelopment ==
Altman conducted a careful analysis of the brain evolution through his comparison of nervous systems of several species. This analysis contributed to comparative psychology and to the theory of the evolution of the brain.

== Awards ==
- 2011 Prince of Asturias Award for Technical and Scientific Research.
- 2012 International Prize for Biology

== See also ==
- André Gernez
- Cerebellum
- Hungary in World War II
- Stem cell
