= Artificial neural membrane =

Artificial neural membrane (ANM) refers to a new class of functional structure developed through research adaptive and evolutionary neural networks and programmable materials. The greatest interest in ANM structures surround their potential as open architecture environments for the integration of microscale and nanoscale devices.

Originally based on the Neurogenesis Algorithms developed by mathematician and engineering physicist Dr. P. A. Menges. While working as a postdoctoral research associate at Los Alamos National Laboratory, Dr. Menges became interested in thin film materials used in specialized sensors also referred to as smart skins. After leaving the laboratory she established a computational method allowing networks to automatically embed or simulate on other networks based in functional materials.

Artificial neural membrane technology development has been funded by the NASA Institute for Advanced Concepts, for application to flapping wing flight. Currently Aerospace Research Systems, Inc – the agency that pioneered work in developing artificial neurons for use in control of multifunctional smart structures – is applying the technology to reusable launch vehicles. Other applications include biotechnology processes, morphing aircraft and spacecraft, adaptive wind generators, and artificial organs. Recent research also indicates that ANM systems may provide the first truly automated intentional or conceptual programming environment. The ANM technology has been referred as being as significant as semiconductors in the 1950s.
