= Rostral migratory stream =

One path neural stem cells take to reach the olfactory bulb

Identifiers
- Acronym: RMS
- NeuroLex ID: birnlex_1702

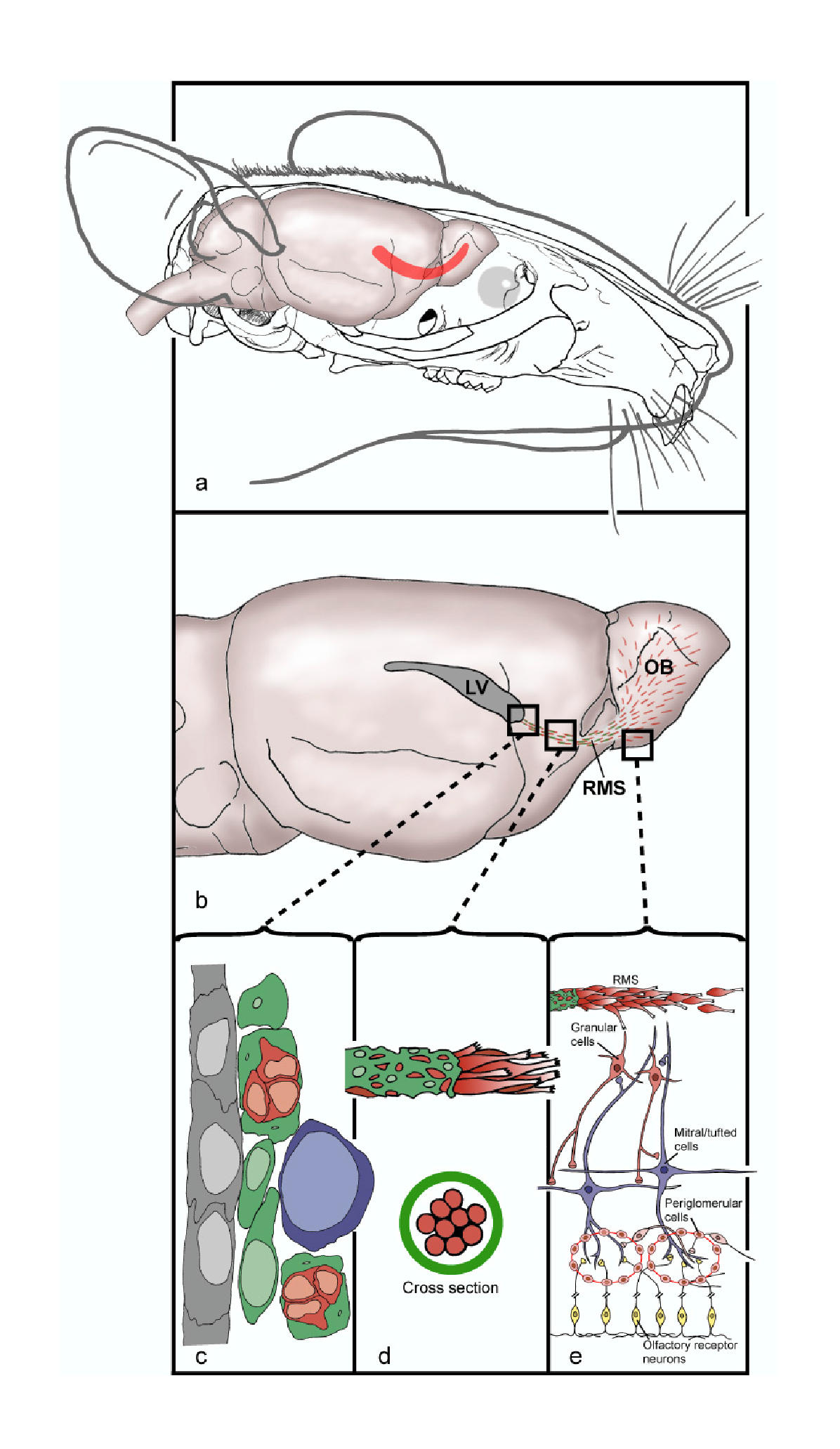
(a) Head of a mouse showing the location of the brain and the rostral migratory stream, RMS (in red), along which newly generated neuroblasts migrate from the SVZ of the lateral ventricle into the olfactory bulb (OB). (b) The migration of newly generated neuroblasts begins at the lateral ventricle, continues along the RMS and terminates in the OB, where mature interneuron populations are generated. (c) Schematic based on electron microscopy showing the cytoarchitecture of the SVZ along the ventricle. Ependymal cells (gray) form a monolayer along the ventricle with astrocytes (green), neuroblasts (red) and transitory amplifying neuronal precursors (TAP) (purple) comprising the SVZ. (d) Schematic showing the migration of neuroblasts along the RMS. Astrocytes (green) ensheath the migrating neuroblasts (red) and are thought to restrict and contain the neuroblasts to their specific pathway. (e) Migrating neuroblasts enter the OB, migrate radially and give rise to granule or periglomerular cells. From a paper by Jessica B Lennington, et al., 2003.

The rostral migratory stream (RMS) is a specialized migratory route found in the brain of some animals along which neuronal precursors that originated in the subventricular zone (SVZ) of the brain migrate to reach the main olfactory bulb (OB). The importance of the RMS lies in its ability to refine and even change an animal's sensitivity to smells, which explains its importance and larger size in the rodent brain as compared to the human brain, as our olfactory sense is not as developed. This pathway has been studied in the rodent, rabbit, and both the squirrel monkey and rhesus monkey. When the neurons reach the OB they differentiate into GABAergic interneurons as they are integrated into either the granule cell layer or periglomerular layer.

Although it was originally believed that neurons could not regenerate in the adult brain, neurogenesis has been shown to occur in mammalian brains, including those of primates. However, neurogenesis is limited to the hippocampus and SVZ, and the RMS is one mechanism neurons use to relocate from these areas.

== Brief history ==
The RMS was named and discovered by J. Altman in 1969 using ^{3}H-thymidine autoradiography in the rat brain. He traced the migration of labeled cells from the SVZ, which is situated throughout the lateral walls of the lateral ventricles, rostrally to the main olfactory bulb. He also quantitatively studied the effect of age on the size of the RMS. There is still some ongoing debate about the extent of the RMS and adult SVZ neurogenesis of new neurons in humans.

== Cell biology ==
=== Vascular cells ===
Vascular cells are known to play a prominent role in regulating proliferation of adult neural precursors. In the adult subgranular zone (SGZ), dense clusters of dividing cells were found to be anatomically close to the vasculature, especially capillaries. Contacts between adult SVZ neuronal precursors and blood vessels are unusually permeable and frequently devoid of astrocyte and pericyte interferences, suggesting that blood-derived cues are gaining direct access to adult neural precursors and their progeny. The vasculature also provides the substrate for new neuron migration after injury in the adult striatum. In the RMS, vascular cells are arranged parallel to the route of the migrating cells and provide a scaffolding. Glial cells are also associated with the blood vessels; communication between these cells may be important for RMS migration, for example, in BDNF (brain-derived neurotrophic factor), a growth factor that is thought to module RMS migration.

=== Astrocytes ===
Astrocytes form gap junctions and are closely associated with the vasculature and its basal lamina in the adult SVZ and subsequently in the RMS. They may serve as an interface to modulate influences of endothelial and circulation-derived factors as well as the availability of cytokines and growth factors in this system. In addition, astrocytes derived from the neurogenic hippocampus and SVZ, but not from the non-neurogenic spinal cord, promote proliferation and neuronal fate commitment of multipotent adult neural stem cells in culture, suggesting a role in the RMS. Astrocytes express a number of secreted and membrane-attached factors both in vitro and in vivo that are known to regulate proliferation and fate specification of adult neural precursors as well as neuronal migration, maturation, and synapse formation. In the adult SVZ, astrocytes express Robo receptors and regulate the rapid migration of SLIT1-expressing neuroblasts through the RMS. Additionally, it has been proposed that the neuroblasts themselves play a role in modulating the astrocytes through Slit-Robo interactions. In the absence of Slit, astrocytic processes do not align correctly, or create the "tubes", instead running across the migrating neurons. Adult SVZ astrocytes also appear to release glutamate to regulate the survival of neuroblasts. Unique to the adult SVZ, ependymal cells lining the ventricular wall are in close association with neural precursors and their progeny, acting like a shield to protect the "neurogenic niche", a zone in which stem cells are retained after embryonic development for the production of new cells of the nervous system.

=== Other glial cells ===
Ependymal cells actively regulate neuronal fate specification of adult neural precursors through release of Noggin. Beating of the cilia of ependymal cells appears to set up concentration gradients of guidance molecules, such as cytokines TNF-α (tumor necrosis factor) and IGF-1 (insulin-like growth factor), to direct migration of neuroblasts, such as in the RMS. Microglia also actively regulate adult neurogenesis. Under basal conditions, apoptotic corpses of newly generated neurons are rapidly phagocytosed from the niche by unactivated microglia in the adult SGZ. Under inflammatory conditions, reactivated microglia can have both beneficial and detrimental effects on different aspects of adult neurogenesis, depending on the balance between secreted molecules with pro- and anti-inflammatory action. In one study, the activation of microglia and recruitment of T cells were suggested to be required for enriched environment-induced SGZ neurogenesis, suggesting a possible role in the RMS.

== Migration mechanics ==
Cells in the RMS are believed to move by "chain migration". These neuroblasts are connected by membrane specializations including gap junctions and adherens junctions, moving along each other towards the olfactory bulb through glial tubes. The pathway and mechanisms behind this movement are a ventriculo-olfactory neurogenic system (VONS), a glial framework, and a chemotaxic cell signalling system.

=== Ventriculo-olfactory neurogenic system (VONS) ===
The olfactory system is made up in part of the RMS which stretches from the subventricular zone in the wall of the lateral ventricle, through the basal forebrain, to the olfactory bulb (OB). VONS is the name given to this pathway, and it consists of the subventricular zone, the RMS, the olfactory tract and the olfactory bulb. Developing neurons leave the subventricular zone and enter the RMS and travel caudally and ventrally along the undersurface of the caudate nucleus; this is referred to as the descending limb. Upon reaching the ventral side of the caudate nucleus, the neurons follow the rostral limb and travel ventrally and rostrally, entering the anterior olfactory cortex (AOC). The AOC gives rise to the olfactory tract, which ends in the olfactory bulb.

=== Glial framework ===
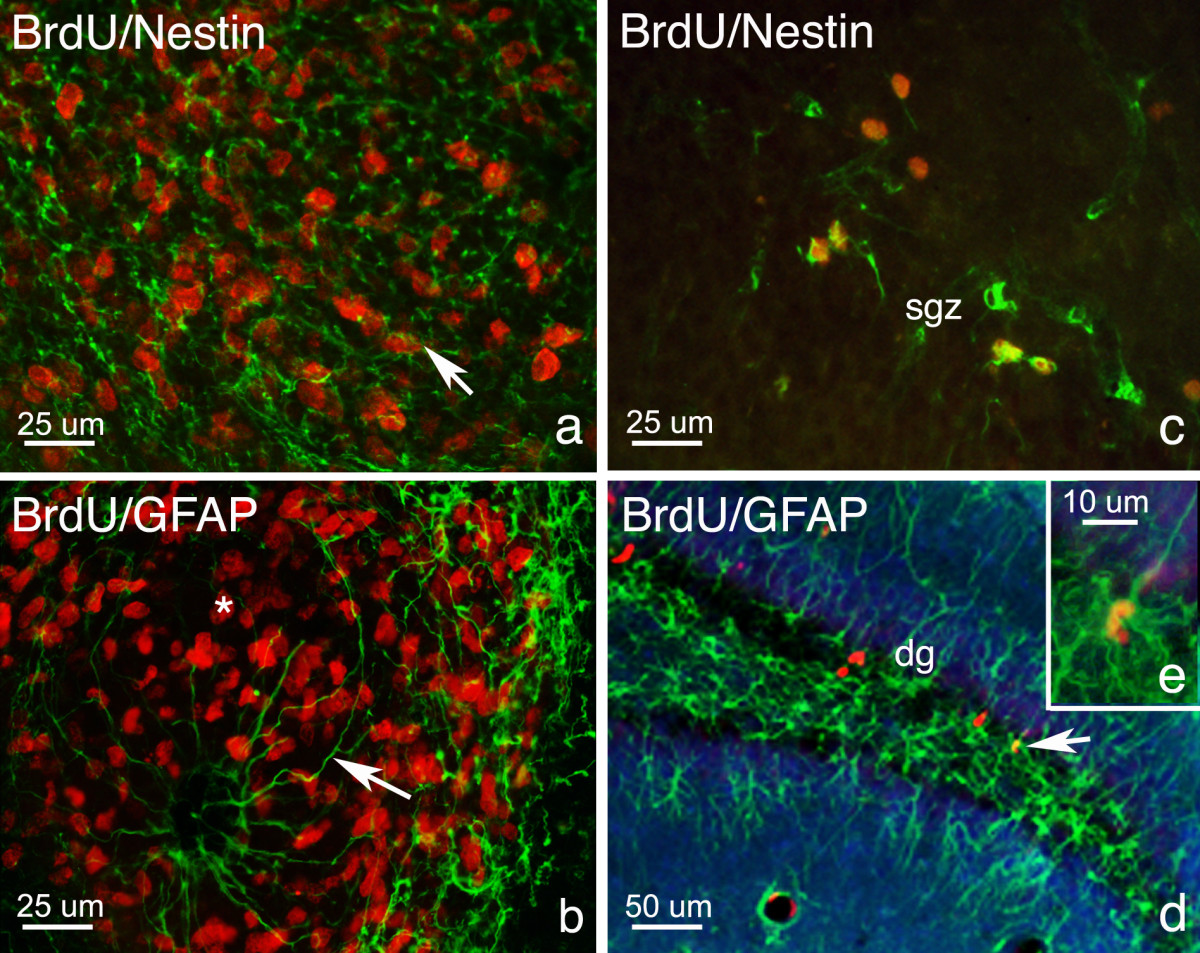
Phenotypes of proliferating cells in the Rostral Migratory Stream and Dentate Gyrus. Phenotypes of proliferating cells in the RMS and DG. Double-labeled immunofluorescence studies showed that in the RMS most cells were BrdU+/nestin+ (arrow, a) and revealed the presence of GFAP+ filaments (arrow, b) surrounding BrdU+ cells (asterisk, b). In the DG, BrdU+/nestin+ cells (c) were seen and a few BrdU+/GFAP+ cells could also be found (arrow, d, e). BrdU (red); nestin, GFAP (green). Adapted from a paper by Maryam Faiz, et al., 2005.

Developing neurons travel toward the olfactory bulb along the RMS via glial tubes, which mark the division between the differentiated nervous tissue and the tissue with embryonic characteristics. Uniquely, the cells travel tangential to the brain surface, parallel to the pial surfaces rather than radially like most developing neurons. Neurons that migrate tangentially are typically believed to migrate independently of radial glia but in the RMS researchers believe this is not the case. Adult rat glial tubes have been observed via light and electron microscopy and described as a meshwork of astrocytic bodies and processes. They have been determined to be astrocytes based on the typical expression of GFAP (glial fibrillary acidic protein) and more specifically as protoplasmic astrocytes based on their morphology. Furthermore, these glial cells were found to be positive for vimentin expression, a protein commonly found in embryonic or immature glial cells. The developing neurons are identified by their expression of the cell surface molecule, a polysialylated (PSA) embryonic form of the neural cell adhesion molecule (NCAM) called PSA-NCAM, as well as β-tubulin, a protein often found in postmitotic neuroblasts, proving the cells of RMS are committed to developing into neurons and will do so upon entry into the olfactory bulb. With the removal of NCAM, the neuroblasts scatter, proving the importance of NCAM in chain formation. The neurons form both clusters and chains along the lumen of these glial tubes. Once the developing neurons reach the core of the olfactory bulb, they detach from the RMS, which is initiated by Reelin and tenascin and move radially toward glomeruli, this migration is dependent on tenascin-R, and differentiate into subtypes of interneurons. These neurons have been studied in vivo via electrophysiology and confocal imaging.

=== Cell signaling ===
The nature of the molecular cues involved in the correct targeting of the migrating precursors remains a question. The secretion of a chemoattractant factor by the OB appears as a possibility. Chemoattractants and repellants act on the migrating neurons by inducing changes in the growth cone to direct them. Nevertheless, tissue derived from this structure had no directive influence on the migration. On the other hand, a septum-derived secreted factor showed a repulsive effect on the SVZ cells. More recently, it has been shown that the secreted molecule SLIT shows such a repelling effect on SVZ-derived precursors. Furthermore, integrins have been demonstrated to have a regulatory influence on precursor cell chain-migration and regulation of their divisions. PSA-NCAM appears as another candidate. Mice lacking NCAM show a dramatically size-reduced OB and an accumulation of migrating precursors along the RMS. It is possible that lack of NCAM results in agitation of neuron–glia interactions, and modifications in these interactions might in turn be responsible for the inhibition of migration in the RMS. It has been demonstrated that a cross talk exists between neurons and glial cells and data in favor of an active role of PSA–NCAM in this process has been presented. The lack of PSA–NCAM on the surface of migrating precursors might alter the proliferative properties of this glial cell population, a scenario that appears reminiscent of astrogliosis occurring in neurodegenerative diseases even before any signs of neuronal damage.

== Current research ==
=== Existence in humans ===
The presence of an analogous RMS in humans has been difficult to identify, possibly because the olfactory bulb is significantly less developed in humans than in rodents and thus harder to study, and much of the previous scientific work has been called into question concerning the RMS in humans. In the developing fetal brain and in young postnatal infants, chains of immature neurons typical of the RMS were observed. However, there was little evidence for the existence of a migrating chain along the SVZ or olfactory peduncle to the bulb in the adult human brain, even though there was a distinct population of adult neuronal stem cells in the SVZ. These researchers studied subjects from 0 to 84 years of age by analyzing brain sections that had been removed during surgery or during autopsies. They discovered that cells that expressed DCX (doublecortin) and PSA-NCAM are present in the brain sections taken from infants, but have disappeared by 18 months. Yet further studies indicated the presence of a small population of migrating immature neurons, which originate solely from the SVZ. These neuroblasts appear singly or in pairs without forming chains, in contrast to the elongated chains of neuroblasts observed in the rodent RMS. This suggests that the RMS is drastically reduced beyond infancy and especially into adulthood, but is not absent. However, a direct correlation between stem cell quiescence and age has not yet been defined due to a high level of variability between individuals. Thus an RMS analogous structure in the adult human brain remains highly controversial.

=== Age-related decline ===
The extent of age-related RMS decline in humans has been the subject of significant debate. The decline of neurogenesis in and migration from the hippocampus in humans has already been well documented. Furthermore, age-related declines in the activities of SVZ stem cells, which migrate to the OB via the RMS, are in place by middle age in rodents. In elderly mice, studies showed that the population of actively dividing SVZ cells and the rate of interneuron replacement in the OB are both drastically reduced, indicating an age-related decline in neuronal proliferation and migration through the RMS. This decline was shown to be due to neuronal stem cell quiescence in the SVZ even by middle age, and not destruction, much like in the hippocampus.

=== Pharmaceuticals ===
Another topic in current RMS research pertains to pharmaceuticals. Scientists are still trying to tackle the difficult task of administering drugs into the brain and getting them past the selective blood–brain barrier. In a recent study, researchers tested the role of the RMS in “intranasal delivery of drugs into the CNS”. In this study, the experimenters disrupted the RMS in mice, which obstructed “the uptake of intranasally administered radioligands into the CNS.” Fluorescent tracers were also used to track the medicine throughout the brain. It was found that the medicine spread to all regions of the brain, including the olfactory bulb. The study concluded that the RMS was extremely prevalent and necessary in the central nervous system in order to deliver drugs intranasally. The study also noted that this research on the RMS is not sufficient, but instead needs to be expanded. Some of the limits and capabilities of the RMS are still unknown, as well as some of the hazards of it. If drugs are to be administered into the CNS through the RMS, all of the details of the RMS must be known in order to ensure safe delivery of the drugs to the brain.

=== α6β1 integrin ===
A study was conducted testing a specific integrin, alpha-six-beta-one, and the role it plays in the RMS. The study researched the principle that chemoattractive molecules may play an important role in neuroblast migration in the RMS. The study of this one particular integrin was conducted in mice. By using antibodies to bind to α6β1 integrin subunits, found on the neuroblasts, the researchers observed that the migration was disrupted. Furthermore, they investigated the mechanism through which α6β1 integrin functions and determined it was via the chemoattractant laminin. This was completed by injecting laminin perpendicular to the RMS and observing that doing so drew “neuroblasts away from their normal course of migration”. The researchers concluded with the idea that this research could prove useful for therapeutics purposes in that neuroblasts could potentially be drawn to locations of injury or disease.
