= David Rowitch =

Neuroscientist and pediatrician

David Rowitch FMedSci FRS
- Born: USA
- Education: UCSD (BA); UCLA (MD); University of Cambridge (PhD, honorary ScD)
- Known for: Genetics of glia differentiation; First Neuro–NICU
- Scientific career
- Fields: Developmental neurobiology
- Institutions: UCSF; University of Cambridge
- Thesis: Structure and assembly of filamentous bacteriophages (1988)
- Doctoral advisor: Richard Perham
- Other academic advisors: Andy McMahon
- Notable students: Anna Molofsky
- Website: rowitchlab.medschl.cam.ac.uk

David H. Rowitch, FMedSci, FRS is an American physician-scientist known for his contributions to developmental glial biology and treatment of white matter diseases. He heads the Department of Paediatrics at the University of Cambridge and is an adjunct professor of pediatrics at the University of California San Francisco (UCSF).

== Education and career ==
Rowitch earned a BA in cell biology from University of California San Diego in 1982. He received his PhD in biochemistry in 1988 from the University of Cambridge, where he worked with Richard Perham on filamentous bacteriophages; and his MD from University of California Los Angeles in 1989. Following the completion of his degrees, Rowitch trained in pediatrics (1989–92) and neonatal-perinatal medicine (1993–96) at Boston Children's Hospital. He conducted research with Andrew P. McMahon as a postdoctoral fellow at Harvard University from 1994 to 1998.

In 1999, Rowitch joined the faculty of Harvard Medical School as an assistant professor of pediatrics and established his laboratory at Dana–Farber Cancer Institute, where he led foundational work on the genetics of neuron and glia differentiation. He was promoted to associate professor in 2004.

Rowitch departed HMS in 2006, moving to San Francisco to become the Chief of Neonatology at UCSF Benioff Children's Hospital. There, he helped to lead the formation of the first neonatal intensive care unit specializing in neurointensive care for premature infants. He continued to conduct research and was named an HHMI Investigator in 2007.

In 2016, Rowitch became the head of the Department of Paediatrics and was awarded an honorary ScD at the University of Cambridge. Rowitch was appointed a Wellcome Trust Senior Investigator at the Wellcome–MRC Cambridge Stem Cell Institute. He retained an adjunct professorship of pediatrics and neurosurgery at UCSF, where he continues to have a lab in the Eli and Edyth Broad Institute for Stem Cell Research and Regenerative Medicine. He is a co-principal investigator of the Autism Prenatal Sex Differences (APEX) study funded by the Simons Foundation Autism Research Initiative in 2021. He returned to the San Francisco Bay Area in late 2023.

== Research ==
Broadly, Rowitch studies the specification of oligodendrocytes and astrocytes in the central nervous system. His work has spanned normal development as well as multiple disease areas, especially those impacting white matter such as cerebral palsy, leukodystrophy, and multiple sclerosis.

His laboratory was the first to isolate Olig1 and Olig2, two related bHLH transcription factors which are essential for the differentiation of both motoneurons and oligodendrocytes. Subsequent work from his group demonstrated that Olig2 is also present in diffuse gliomas, suggesting that primary brain tumor progression can share molecular mechanisms with normal neurodevelopment, such as Sonic hedgehog signaling. Rowitch also led or co-led high-throughput screens to identify candidate genes related to neuron and glia specification, including a genome-wide library of transcription factors involved in mouse brain organization and microarray-based gene expression profiling of astrocyte-specific genes.

His laboratory has helped to establish the importance of oligodendrocyte progenitor cells in promoting postnatal angiogenesis in white matter by delaying myelination until the appropriate developmental time via hypoxia-inducible factor activity and canonical Wnt signaling.

Rowitch was the primary investigator of a first-in-human clinical trial funded by StemCells, Inc. to transplant neural stem cells directly into the brains of patients with Pelizaeus-Merzbacher disease (PMD). Dermal fibroblasts donated by the patients were also studied to reveal that iron toxicity is primarily responsible for oligodendrocyte death in early-onset PMD, and that treatment with deferiprone could rescue myelination in vitro and in mice.

== Awards and honors ==
Rowitch was elected to the Association of American Physicians in 2012, the Academy of Medical Sciences in 2018, and the Royal Society in 2021. He was appointed to the National Advisory Child Health and Human Development Council in 2020. He was elected a Member of the National Academy of Medicine in 2024.
