= Oligodendrocyte progenitor cell =

Subtype of glial cell in the central nervous system

Details
- System: Central nervous system
- Location: Brain, spinal cord

Identifiers
- Acronym: OPC
- MeSH: D000073637
- TH: H2.00.06.2.01007

Oligodendrocyte progenitor cells (OPCs), also known as oligodendrocyte precursor cells, NG2-glia, O2A cells, or polydendrocytes, are a subtype of glia in the central nervous system named for their essential role as precursors to oligodendrocytes and myelin. They are typically identified in the human by co-expression of PDGFRA and CSPG4.

OPCs play a critical role in developmental and adult myelinogenesis. They give rise to oligodendrocytes, which then wrap around axons and provide electrical insulation by forming a myelin sheath. This enables faster action potential propagation and high fidelity transmission without a need for an increase in axonal diameter. The loss or lack of OPCs, and consequent lack of differentiated oligodendrocytes, is associated with a loss of myelination and subsequent impairment of neurological functions. In addition, OPCs express receptors for various neurotransmitters and undergo membrane depolarization when they receive synaptic inputs from neurons.

== Structure ==
OPCs are glial cells that are typically identified by co-expression of NG2 (a chondroitin sulfate proteoglycan encoded by CSPG4 in humans) and platelet-derived growth factor receptor alpha (encoded by PDGFRA). They are smaller than neurons, of comparable size to other glia, and can either have a bipolar or complex multipolar morphology with processes reaching up to ~50 μm. OPCs comprise approximately 3–4% of cells in grey matter and 8–9% in white matter, making them the fourth largest group of glia after astrocytes, microglia and oligodendrocytes.

OPCs are present throughout the brain, including the hippocampus and in all layers of the neocortex. They distribute themselves and achieve a relatively even distribution through active self-repulsion. OPCs constantly survey their surroundings through actively extending and retracting processes that have been termed growth cone like processes. Death or differentiation of an OPC is rapidly followed by migration or local proliferation of a neighboring cell to replace it.

In white matter, OPCs are found along unmyelinated axons as well as along myelinated axons, engulfing nodes of Ranvier. Recently, OPCs have been shown to reside in close contact with NG2-expressing pericytes in cerebral white matter, as well.

OPCs receive synaptic contacts onto their processes from both glutamatergic and GABAergic neurons. OPCs receive preferred somatic contacts from fast-spiking GABAergic neurons, while non-fast spiking interneurons have a preference for contacting the processes. These inhibitory connections (in mice) occur mainly during a specific period in development, from postnatal day 8 till postnatal day 13.

== Development ==
OPCs first appear during embryonic organogenesis. In the developing neural tube, Shh (Sonic hedgehog) signaling and expression of Nkx6.1/Nkx6.2 coordinate expression of Olig1 and Olig2 in neuroepithelial cells of the pMN and p3 domains of the ventral ventricular zone. Together, Nkx2.2 and Olig1/Olig2 drive OPC specification.

In the forebrain, three regionally distinct sources have been shown to generate OPCs sequentially. OPCs first originate from Nkx2.1-expressing cells in the ventricular zone of the medial ganglionic eminence. Some OPCs are also generated from multipotent progenitors in the subventricular zone (SVZ). These cells migrate into the olfactory bulb. Depending on their origin in the SVZ, these progenitors give rise to either OPCs or astrocytes. Typically, cells originating from the posterior and dorsomedial SVZ produce more oligodendrocytes owing to increased exposure to posterior Shh signaling and dorsal Wnt signaling which favors OPC specification, in contrast to ventral Bmp signaling which inhibits it.

As development progresses, second and third waves of OPCs originate from Gsh2-expressing cells in the lateral and caudal ganglionic eminences and generate the majority of adult oligodendrocytes. After the committed progenitor cells exit the germinal zones, they migrate and proliferate locally to eventually occupy the entire CNS parenchyma. OPCs are highly proliferative, migratory, and have bipolar morphology.

OPCs continue to exist in both white and grey matter in the adult brain and maintain their population through self-renewal. White matter OPCs proliferate at higher rates and are best known for their contributions to adult myelinogenesis, while grey matter OPCs are slowly proliferative or quiescent and mostly remain in an immature state. Subpopulations of OPCs have different resting membrane potentials, ion channel expression, and ability to generate action potentials.

=== Fate ===
Typically beginning in postnatal development, OPCs myelinate the entire central nervous system (CNS). They differentiate into the less mobile premyelinating oligodendrocytes that further differentiate into oligodendrocytes, a process characterized by the emergence of the expression of myelin basic protein (MBP), proteolipid protein (PLP), or myelin-associated glycoprotein (MAG). Following terminal differentiation in vivo, mature oligodendrocytes wrap around and myelinate axons. In vitro, oligodendrocytes create an extensive network of myelin-like sheets. The process of differentiation can be observed both through morphological changes and cell surface markers specific to the discrete stage of differentiation, though the signals for differentiation are unknown. The various waves of OPCs could myelinate distinct regions of the brain, which suggests that distinct functional subpopulations of OPCs perform different functions.

Differentiation of OPCs into oligodendrocytes involves massive reorganization of cytoskeleton proteins ultimately resulting in increased cell branching and lamella extension, allowing oligodendrocytes to myelinate multiple axons. Multiple pathways contribute to oligodendrocyte branching, but the exact molecular process by which oligodendrocytes extend and wrap around multiple axons remains incompletely understood. Laminin, a component of the extracellular matrix, plays an important role in regulating oligodendrocyte production. Mice lacking laminin alpha2-subunit produced fewer OPCs in the subventricular zone (SVZ). Deletion of Dicer1 disrupts normal brain myelination. However, miR-7a, and miRNA in OPCs, promotes OPC production during brain development.

=== Controversy ===
The possibility and in vivo relevance of OPC differentiation into astrocytes or neurons are highly debated. Using Cre-Lox recombination-mediated genetic fate mapping, several labs have reported the fate of OPCs using different Cre driver and reporter mouse lines. It is generally held that OPCs predominantly generate oligodendrocytes, and the rate at which they generate oligodendrocytes declines with age and is greater in white matter than in grey matter. Up to 30% of the oligodendrocytes that exist in the adult corpus callosum are generated de novo from OPCs over a period of 2 months. It is not known whether all OPCs eventually generate oligodendrocytes while self-renewing the population, or whether some remain as OPCs throughout the life of the animal and never differentiate into oligodendrocytes.

OPCs may retain the ability to differentiate into astrocytes into adulthood. Using NG2-Cre mice, it was shown that OPCs in the prenatal and perinatal grey matter of the ventral forebrain and spinal cord generate protoplasmic type II astrocytes in addition to oligodendrocytes. However, contrary to the prediction from optic nerve cultures, OPCs in white matter do not generate astrocytes. When the oligodendrocyte transcription factor Olig2 is deleted specifically in OPCs, there is a region- and age-dependent switch in the fate of OPCs from oligodendrocytes to astrocytes.

Whereas some studies suggested that OPCs can generate cortical neurons, other studies rejected these findings. The question is unresolved, as studies continue to find that certain populations of OPCs can form neurons. In conclusion, these studies suggest that OPCs do not generate a significant number of neurons under normal conditions, and that they are distinct from neural stem cells that reside in the subventricular zone.

== Function ==
As implied by their name, OPCs were long held to function purely as progenitors to oligodendrocytes. Their role as a progenitor cell type has since expanded to include both oligodendrocytes and some protoplasmic type II astrocytes in grey matter. Later, additional functions were suggested.

=== Remyelination ===
Spontaneous myelin repair was first observed in cat models. It was later discovered to occur in the human CNS as well, specifically in cases of multiple sclerosis (MS). Spontaneous myelin repair does not result in morphologically normal oligodendrocytes and is associated with thinner myelin compared to axonal diameter than normal myelin. Despite morphological abnormalities, however, remyelination does restore normal conduction. In addition, spontaneous remyelination does not appear to be rare, at least in the case of MS. Studies of MS lesions reported the average extent of remyelination as high as 47%. Comparative studies of cortical lesions reported a greater proportion of remyelination in the cortex as opposed to white matter lesions.

OPCs retain the ability to proliferate in adulthood and comprise 70–90% of the proliferating cell population in the mature CNS. Under conditions in the developing and mature CNS where a reduction in the normal number of oligodendrocytes or myelin occurs, OPCs react promptly by undergoing increased proliferation. Rodent OPCs proliferate in response to demyelination in acute or chronic lesions created by chemical agents such as lysolecithin, and newborn cells differentiate into remyelinating oligodendrocytes. A chelating agent cuprizone is also used in these demyelination studies in rats. Similarly, OPC proliferation occurs in other types of injury that are accompanied by loss of myelin, such as spinal cord injury.

Despite OPCs' potential to give rise to myelinating oligodendrocytes, complete myelin regeneration is rarely observed clinically or in chronic experimental models. Possible explanations for remyelination failure include depletion of OPCs over time, failure to recruit OPCs to the demyelinated lesion, and failure of recruited OPCs to differentiate into mature oligodendrocytes (reviewed in). In fresh MS lesions, clusters of HNK-1+ oligodendrocytes have been observed, which suggests that under favorable conditions OPCs expand around demyelinated lesions and generate new oligodendrocytes. In chronic MS lesions where remyelination is incomplete, there is evidence that there are oligodendrocytes with processes extending toward demyelinated axons, but they do not seem to be able to generate new myelin. The mechanisms that regulate differentiation of OPCs into myelinating oligodendrocytes are an active area of research.

Another unanswered question is whether the OPC pool eventually becomes depleted after it is used to generate remyelinating cells. Clonal analysis of isolated OPCs in the normal mouse forebrain suggests that in the adult, most clones originating from single OPCs consist of either a heterogeneous population containing both oligodendrocytes and OPCs or a homogeneous population consisting exclusively of OPCs, suggesting that OPCs in the adult CNS are able to self-renew and are not depleted under normal conditions. However, it is not known whether this dynamic is altered in response to demyelinating lesions.

=== Neuron–OPC interactions ===
==== Node of Ranvier ====
Nodes of Ranvier are spaces between myelin sheathing. OPCs extend their processes to the nodes of Ranvier and together with astrocyte processes make up the nodal glial complex. Since the nodes of Ranvier contain a high density of voltage-dependent sodium channels and allow regenerative action potentials to be generated, it is speculated that this location allows OPCs to sense and possibly respond to neuronal activity.

==== Neuromodulation ====
OPCs synthesize the neuromodulatory factors prostaglandin D2 synthase (PTGDS) and neuronal pentraxin 2 (NPTX2). This is regulated by NG2, whose intracellular domain can be cleaved by γ-secretase and translocated to the nucleus. The NG2 ectodomain can also modulate AMPA and NMDA receptor-dependent LTP. Constitutive and activity-dependent cleavage of NG2 by ADAM10 releases the ectodomain, which contains two N-terminal LNS domains that act on neuronal synapses.

==== Neuron–OPC synapse ====
OPCs express numerous voltage-gated ion channels and neurotransmitter receptors. Structural studies have shown that neurons form synapses with OPCs in both grey matter and white matter. Electron microscopy revealed OPC membranes apposed to neuronal presynaptic terminals filled with synaptic vesicles. OPCs express AMPA receptors and GABA_{A} receptors and undergo small membrane depolarizations in response to presynaptic vesicular glutamate or GABA release.

OPCs can undergo cell division while maintaining synaptic inputs from neurons. These observations suggest that cells that receive neuronal synaptic inputs and those that differentiate into oligodendrocytes are not mutually exclusive cell populations but that the same population of OPCs can receive synaptic inputs and generate myelinating oligodendrocytes. However, OPCs appear to lose their ability to respond to synaptic inputs from neurons as they differentiate into mature oligodendrocytes. The functional significance of the neuron-OPC synapses remains to be elucidated.

=== Immunomodulation ===
OPCs have been increasingly recognized for their pivotal role in modulating immune responses, particularly in autoimmune diseases such as multiple sclerosis. They may participate in both initiation and resolution of immune responses to disease or injury. They are highly responsive to injury, undergo a morphological activation similar to that of astrocytes and microglia, and may contribute to glial scar formation. Conversely, OPCs have been shown to downregulate microglia activation and protect against neuronal death. They also express and secrete many immune-related molecules, such as chemokines, cytokines, interleukins, and other related ligands or receptors. OPCs can internalize myelin debris via phagocytosis, a process mediated through the LRP1 pathway. Furthermore, recent works have illustrated that OPCs can act as antigen presenting cells via both MHC class I and class II and can modulate both CD4+ and CD8+ T cells.

== Clinical significance ==
Transplantation of OPCs has been considered as a possible treatment for neurological diseases which cause demyelination. However, it is difficult to generate a suitable number of quality cells for clinical use. Finding a source for these cells remains impractical as of 2016. Should adult cells be used for transplantation, a brain biopsy would be required for each patient, adding to the risk of immune rejection. Embryonically derived stem cells have been demonstrated to carry out remyelination under laboratory conditions, but some religious groups are opposed to their use. Adult central nervous system stem cells have also been shown to generate myelinating oligodendrocytes, but are not readily accessible.

Even if a viable source of OPCs were found, identifying and monitoring the outcome of remyelination remains difficult, though multimodal measures of conduction velocity and emerging magnetic resonance imaging techniques offer improved sensitivity versus other imaging methods. In addition, the interaction between transplanted cells and immune cells and the effect of inflammatory immune cells on remyelination have yet to be fully characterized. If the failure of endogenous remyelination is due to an unfavorable differentiation environment, then this will have to be addressed prior to transplantation.

== History ==
It had been known since the early 1900s that astrocytes, oligodendrocytes, and microglia make up the major glial cell populations in the mammalian CNS. The presence of another glial cell population had escaped recognition because of the lack of a suitable marker to identify them in tissue sections. The notion that there exists a population of glial progenitor cells in the developing and mature CNS began to be entertained in the late 1980s by several independent groups. In one series of studies on the development and origin of oligodendrocytes in the rodent CNS, a population of immature cells that appeared to be precursors to oligodendrocytes was identified by the expression of the GD3 ganglioside.

In a separate series of studies, cells from perinatal rat optic nerves that expressed the A2B5 ganglioside were shown to differentiate into oligodendrocytes in culture. Subsequently, A2B5+ cells from other CNS regions and from adult CNS were also shown to generate oligodendrocytes. Based on the observation that these cells require PDGF for their proliferation and expansion, the expression of the alpha receptor for platelet-derived growth factor (Pdgfra) was used to search for the in vivo correlates of the A2B5+ cells, which led to the discovery of a unique population of Pdgfra+ cells in the CNS whose appearance and distribution were consistent with those of developing oligodendrocytes.

Independently, Stallcup and colleagues generated an antiserum that recognized a group of rat brain tumor cell line, which exhibited properties that were intermediate between those of typical neurons and glial cells. Biochemical studies showed that the antiserum recognized a chondroitin sulfate proteoglycan with a core glycoprotein of 300 kDa, and the antigen was named NG2 (nerve/glial antigen 2). NG2 was found to be expressed on A2B5+ oligodendrocyte precursor cells isolated from the perinatal rat CNS tissues and on process-bearing cells in the CNS in vivo. Comparison of NG2 and Pdgfra expression revealed that NG2 and PDGFRA are expressed on the same population of cells in the CNS. These cells represent 2–9% of all the cells and remain proliferative in the mature CNS.

== See also ==
- List of human cell types derived from the germ layers
