= Shiverer mouse =

Shiverer mice are mice which possess the shiverer (shi/shi) mutation in the MBP gene. Shiverer mice develop a characteristic "shaking" or "shivering" gait within a few weeks of birth. They are commonly used as animal models of leukodystrophy in neuroscience research.

== Characteristics ==
The shiverer mutation is an autosomal recessive loss-of-function mutation. It was generated by a 20-kilobase deletion within the MBP gene, resulting in the failure of oligodendrocytes to form compact myelin in the central nervous system. Axons in shiverer mice fail to attain a normal diameter and exhibit altered cytoskeleton structure.

Approximately twelve days after birth, shiverer mice begin to exhibit tremors which progressively worsen. They exhibit tonic seizure behavior after weaning and die prematurely, typically between 50 and 100 days after birth.

== Research use ==
Shiverer mice are used to model human leukodystrophies due to the congenital nature and early onset of the shiverer phenotype, which mimics the disease progression observed in humans. They are also used to study myelin defects more generally in demyelinating diseases such as multiple sclerosis.

The shiverer model has also been used to test novel therapies which promote myelination such as neural stem cell therapy.
