= Yihai Cao =

Chinese-born Swedish scientist and professor

- 曹义海
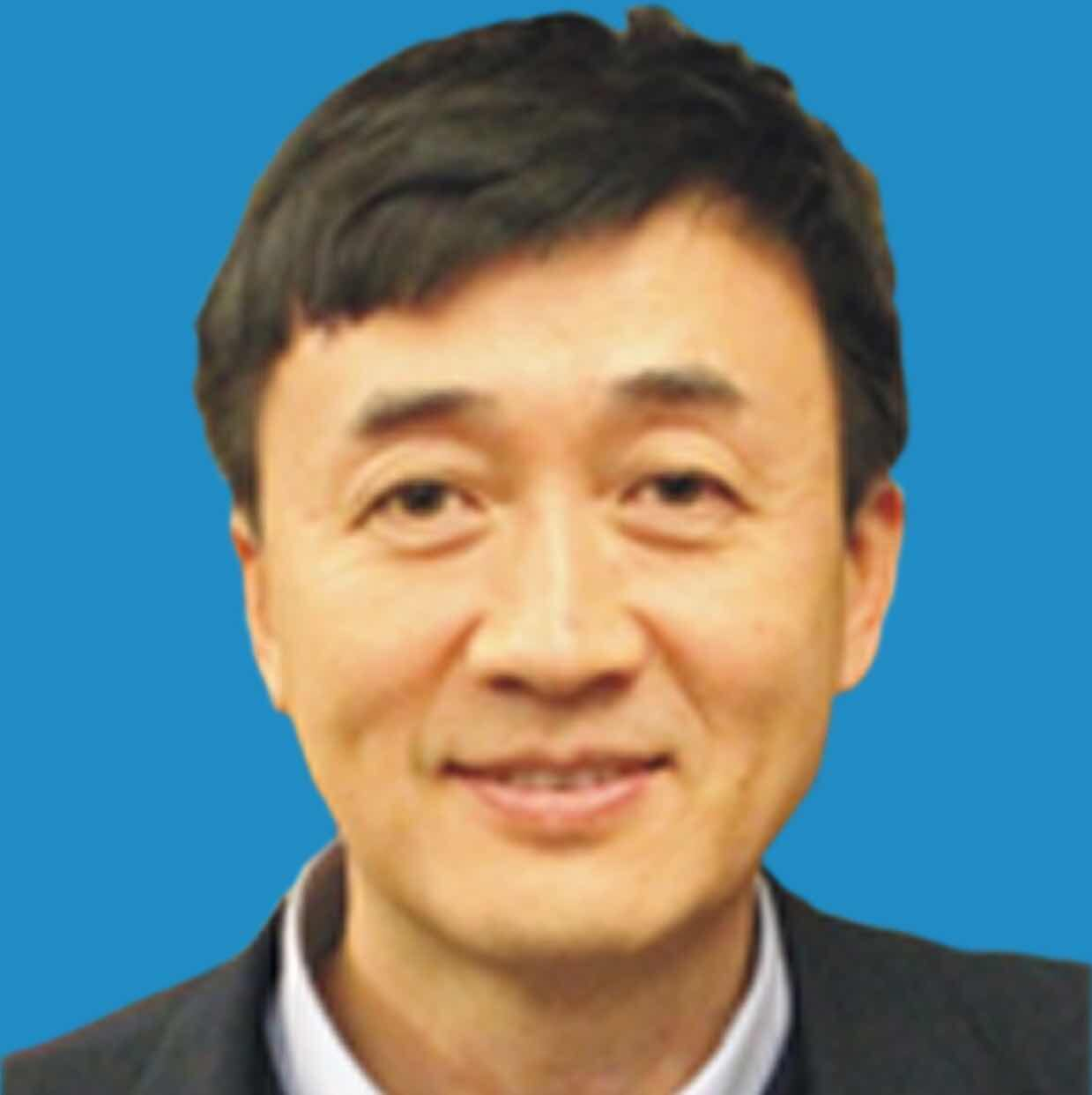
- Born: October 29, 1959 (age 66); Jinan, Shandong, China
- Citizenship: Sweden
- Known for: Angiogenesis research
- Spouse: Anna-Zarah
- Children: 2
- Scientific career
- Fields: Cancer, Metabolic diseases, Cardiovascular diseases
- Workplaces: Karolinska Institute, Stockholm, Sweden
- Thesis: Expression of acidic fibroblast growth factor in vitro and in the brain (1993)
- Doctoral advisor: Ralf Pettersson
- Other academic advisors: Judah Folkman
- Website: ki.se/en/people/yihcao

Yihai Cao, M.D., hM. D., Ph.D., (Chinese: 曹义海; born October 29, 1959) is a Chinese-born Swedish medical scientist and a professor at the Karolinska Institute, Sweden. He is also an honorary professor or guest professor in Copenhagen University, Denmark; Linköping University, Sweden; Leicester University, UK; Shinshu University, Japan; Shandong University, China; and Peking University, China. He is an internationally recognized and cited researcher in cancer, obesity, diabetes, cardiovascular disease, and eye disease research. His publications have been cited more than 35,000 times and his h-index is 92. Cao received the Fernström research prize, the Karolinska distinguished professor award, and the Axel Hirsch Prize in medicine. Cao received an ERC-advanced research grant award, and a Novo Nordisk-advanced grant award. From 2018, Cao was elected to Academia Europaea, the European Academy of Sciences and Arts, the Chinese Academy of Engineering, the National Academy of Inventors, and The World Academy of Sciences. His research findings received broad public attentions including New York Times, Reuters and Swedish National TV broadcasting.

== Contributions to medicine ==
Cao participated in the discovery of angiostatin, an endogenous angiogenesis inhibitor, in Judah Folkman ́s Laboratory. He discovered several angiostatic proteins for potential treatment of cancer. Cao's laboratory discovered catechins in green tea as oral angiogenesis inhibitors. They also discovered several lymphangiogenic factors that potentially contribute to cancer metastasis. Cao proposed a new concept of off-tumor targets of antiangiogenic drugs as potential clinical benefits by improving systemic disease in cancer patients. Together with Henrich Cheng and Lars Olson, Cao for the first time shows that spinal cord can be regenerated by FGF-1. Cao's laboratory was one of the first proposing the concept of combination therapy comprising angiogenic and arteriogenic factors for treatment of ischemic muscle disease. They were one of the first who proposed targeting adipose angiogenesis for treatment of obesity and metabolic diseases.

== Founder of companies ==
Cao founded Swenora in 2001, which develops new therapeutics for treatment of spinal cord injury. In 2005, he founded Clanotech, which develops novel antiangiogenic drugs for treatment of ocular disease and fibrosis disease.
