= CASI Pharmaceuticals =

US based pharmaceutical company

EntreMed
- Industry: Pharmaceuticals
- Founded: 1991; 35 years ago
- Founders: Peter C. Farrell; Bart Chernow; John Holaday
- Headquarters: Rockville, Maryland, United States
- Key people: Wei-Wu He (Chairman & CEO)

CASI Pharmaceuticals, previously known as EntreMed is a US based pharmaceutical company developing medicinal treatments for cancer. The company is primarily known for its producing the angiogenesis inhibitor Endostatin. In 2014 the company was renamed to CASI Pharmaceuticals to focus on products for the treatments of myeloma, leukemia, lymphoma. Wei-Wu He is the present chairman and CEO of the company.

== History and description ==
EntreMed was co-founded in Rockville in the year 1991 by Peter C. Farrell, Bart Chernow and John Holaday. Holaday was the CEO of the company until 2002. He died in October 2019.

== Endostatin ==
In May 1998, The New York Times reported a story about a developing drug in the research stage claiming that the same would lead to "eradicate any type of cancer" and "with no obvious side effects". The treatment was supposed to be based on angiostatin and endostatin which was said to work interfering with the supply of blood required by the tumors. It was also said that the tumors are removed with such treatments. Though the report commented on the high expectations already invoked by previous research and prospective candidates its ultimate results were not what was expected. The report also said that the two potential 'weak drugs' had the ability to reduce cancer growth considerably and will be manufactured by EntreMed. The associated research and potential of the drugs and its prospects was proclaimed by the Harvard researcher Dr. Judah Folkman who was known for working to choke off the blood supply to tumor cells for over three decades. James D. Watson stated in reference to the report that "Judah is going to cure cancer in two years". After the NYT story was published, the stock price of EntreMed went up to $83 from $12. During the latter half of that year several uncertainties regarding the effectiveness of the manufacture of the drug was expressed by National Cancer Institute resulting in a drop of Entremed's stock price by $7.75 during November 1998.

Eventually EntreMed partnered with Bristol-Myers Squibb to carry out R&D about the development of the final drug depending on the base angiostatin protein. Bristol-Myers Squibb announced its decision not to continue researching the drug next year. Though the CEO of EntreMed said that such an announcement was 'frustrating' and a 'non-event', he said the two companies would continue to work together as per their agreed terms. The drug is still under its process of development even after going through several rounds of clinical trials and tests. The initial trials of the drug failed in traditional ways but still the hope of its prospects remained as claimed by the inventor Dr. Folkman. In 2005, EndoStar, a new variant of the drug Endostatin was introduced by a group of Chinese scientists with the support of Luo Yongzhang, one of the investors of EntreMed. This variation was developed with the aim to carry out the clinical trials on the population of China. Experts have preferred to wait further to study the trials, effects and analyze the outcome before concluding anything decisively.

== Renaming ==
During June 2014 EntreMed was renamed to CASI pharmaceuticals through the voting process of the shareholders of the company. In the letter to the shareholder, the CEO at that time, Ken K. Ren said "The new name is in furtherance of the remaking of EntreMed and reflects our mission to combat cancer through advanced science and innovation, and also reflects our integrated development strategy in China and North America".

In August 2019, CASI Pharmaceuticals obtained approval for selling Evomela (an injection treatment for patients with multiple Myelom) to the population of China. This was the first product by the company to be sold to the open market despite it being founded in 1991.

== Bibliography ==
=== Sources ===
- The SAGE Handbook of Healthcare. (2008). United Kingdom: SAGE Publications. ISBN 9781847877000
- Rahman, A., Zaman, K. (2013). Topics in Anti-Cancer Research. (n.p.): Bentham Science Publishers. ISBN 9781608051366
- Choudhary, M. I. (2011). Frontiers in Anti-Cancer Drug Discovery, Volume (1). United Arab Emirates: Bentham Science Publishers. ISBN 9781608051618
- Melanoma: Biologically Targeted Therapeutics. (2002). Ukraine: Humana Press. ISBN 9781592591596
- Adler, D. E. (2009). Snap Judgment: When to Trust Your Instincts, When to Ignore Them, and How to Avoid Making Big Mistakes with Your Mone. (n.p.): Pearson Education. ISBN 9780137037094
- Principles of Molecular Oncology. (2004). Ukraine: Humana Press. ISBN 9781592596645
- Plunkett's Biotech & Genetics Industry Almanac 2006: The Only Complete Reference to the Business of Biotechnology and Genetic Engineering. (2005). United States: Plunkett Research. ISBN 9781593920333
- Abate, T. (2013). The Biotech Investor: How to Profit from the Coming Boom in Biotechnology. United States: Henry Holt and Company. ISBN 9781466851214
- Eaton, M. L., Kennedy, D. (2007). Innovation in Medical Technology: Ethical Issues and Challenges. United States: Johns Hopkins University Press. ISBN 9780801885266

=== Footnotes ===
- Pharmaceutical Biocatalysis: Important Enzymes, Novel Targets, and Therapies. (2020). Singapore: Jenny Stanford Publishing. ISBN 9781000067378
- Jana, S. (2017). Particulate Technology for Delivery of Therapeutics. Singapore: Springer Singapore. ISBN 9789811036477
- Morris, S. A. (2018). Nanotheranostics for Cancer Applications. Germany: Springer International Publishing. ISBN 9783030017750
- Sheinfeld, J., Bochner, B. H., Zelefsky, M. J., Rini, B. I., Scardino, P. T. (2015). Comprehensive Textbook of Genitourinary Oncology. United States: Wolters Kluwer Health/Lippincott Williams & Wilkins. ISBN 9781469874852
