= MCSP =

MCSP can refer to:

- Merlin Capability Sustainment Plus: Mid-Life Update of Merlin (see Lockheed Martin U.K. and AgustaWestland EH101)
- Melanoma-associated chondroitin sulfate proteoglycan, a tumour marker
- Member of the Chartered Society of Physiotherapy
- Minimum cost spanning tree, the lowest costing way to construct a spanning tree graph.
- Multichannel Serial Port: A subsystem of Texas Instruments TMS320 DSPs.
