= NKX6-2 =

Protein-coding gene in humans

Identifiers
- Aliases: NKX6-2, GTX, NKX6.2, NKX6B, NK6 homeobox 2, SPAX8
- External IDs: OMIM: 605955; MGI: 1352738; GeneCards: NKX6-2

Gene location (Human)
Chr.	Chromosome 10 (human)
Band	10q26.3	Start	132,783,179 bp
Band	10q26.3	End	132,786,147 bp

Gene location (Mouse)
Chr.	Chromosome 7 (mouse)
Band	7 F4|7 84.57 cM	Start	139,159,292 bp
Band	7 F4|7 84.57 cM	End	139,162,713 bp
RNA expression pattern
Bgee	Human / Mouse (ortholog); Top expressed in: C1 segment; substantia nigra; putamen; hippocampus proper; primary visual cortex; apex of heart; temporal lobe; amygdala; hypothalamus; caudate nucleus / Top expressed in: lumbar subsegment of spinal cord; ascending aorta; aortic valve; epithelium of gastric gland; substantia nigra; spermatid; spermatocyte; superior frontal gyrus; primary visual cortex; primordial pancreas; More reference expression data
BioGPS	n/a
Gene ontology
Molecular function	DNA-binding transcription factor activity; RNA polymerase II cis-regulatory region sequence-specific DNA binding; sequence-specific DNA binding; DNA-binding transcription repressor activity, RNA polymerase II-specific; DNA binding; DNA-binding transcription factor activity, RNA polymerase II-specific
Cellular component	nucleus
Biological process	multicellular organism development; positive regulation of glial cell differentiation; cell differentiation; oligodendrocyte differentiation; negative regulation of glial cell differentiation; regulation of transcription, DNA-templated; negative regulation of transcription by RNA polymerase II; negative regulation of cell fate commitment; neuromuscular process controlling balance; positive regulation of cell fate commitment; central nervous system myelination; endocrine pancreas development; regulation of myelination; negative regulation of transcription, DNA-templated; positive regulation of transcription by RNA polymerase II
Sources:Amigo / QuickGO
Orthologs
Databases	NCBI: entry; OMA: entry
Species	Human	Mouse
Entrez	84504	14912
Ensembl	ENSG00000148826	ENSMUSG00000041309
UniProt	Q9C056	D3Z4R4
RefSeq (mRNA)	NM_177400	NM_183248
RefSeq (protein)	NP_796374	NP_899071
Location (UCSC)	Chr 10: 132.78 – 132.79 Mb	Chr 7: 139.16 – 139.16 Mb
PubMed search
- Wikidata
View/Edit Human	View/Edit Mouse

Homeobox protein Nkx-6.2 is a protein that in humans is encoded by the NKX6-2 gene.

Nk6 homeobox 2 gene (Nkx6.2) is found on chromosome 10 in humans and on chromosome 7 in murine species. Expression of the Nkx6.2 gene results in the Nkx6.2 transcription factor.

== Tissue distribution ==
Its expression can be seen in the fetal brain, ventral portion of the neural tube, and the developing spinal cord during embryogenesis as well as in the adult brain. Expression was also found to be in germ cells of testes.

== Function ==
Nkx6.2 is involved in the patterning of the central nervous system during early embryo development. As this gene continues to be researched, newfound information suggests that it aids in human oligodendrocyte maturation. It has also been found to be important in motor function stemming from spinal neuronal circuits.

== Clinical significance ==
Disorders with this gene can result in Spastic Ataxia which is a disease characterized by possible neurological issues, impaired learning ability, and a hypomyelinated central nervous system. Another study has shown that methylation of Nkx6.2 can be correlated with renal cancer metastasis.

== Research ==
A Nkx6.2 knock-out mouse model showed abnormal motor ability thus corroborating that Nkx6.2 plays a role in central nervous system development.
