= AMOTL2 =

Protein-coding gene in the species Homo sapiens

Identifiers
- Aliases: AMOTL2, LCCP, angiomotin like 2
- External IDs: OMIM: 614658; MGI: 1929286; HomoloGene: 9420; GeneCards: AMOTL2; OMA:AMOTL2 - orthologs

Gene location (Human)
Chr.	Chromosome 3 (human)
Band	3q22.2	Start	134,355,347 bp
Band	3q22.2	End	134,375,479 bp

Gene location (Mouse)
Chr.	Chromosome 9 (mouse)
Band	9|9 F1	Start	102,593,871 bp
Band	9|9 F1	End	102,610,617 bp
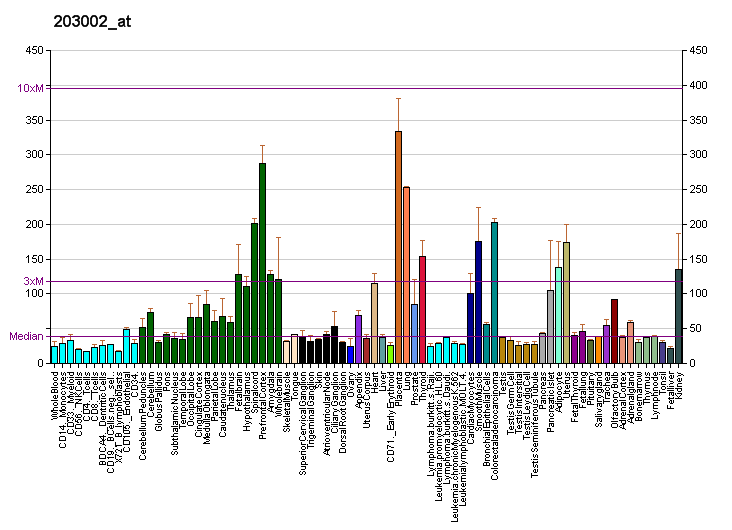
RNA expression pattern
Bgee	Human / Mouse (ortholog); Top expressed in: amniotic fluid; sural nerve; lactiferous duct; inferior ganglion of vagus nerve; right coronary artery; renal medulla; ventricular zone; germinal epithelium; synovial joint; parietal pleura / Top expressed in: calvaria; adrenal gland; right lung; ankle; ventricular zone; white adipose tissue; stroma of bone marrow; vestibular membrane of cochlear duct; lip; right lung lobe; More reference expression data
BioGPS	More reference expression data
Gene ontology
Molecular function	protein binding; identical protein binding
Cellular component	recycling endosome; cytosol; endosome; apical plasma membrane; cytoplasmic vesicle; bicellular tight junction
Biological process	Wnt signaling pathway; hippo signaling; establishment of cell polarity involved in ameboidal cell migration; actin cytoskeleton organization; regulation of cell migration; angiogenesis
Sources:Amigo / QuickGO
Orthologs
Species	Human	Mouse
Entrez	51421	56332
Ensembl	ENSG00000114019	ENSMUSG00000032531
UniProt	Q9Y2J4	Q8K371
RefSeq (mRNA)	NM_001278683; NM_001278685; NM_016201; NM_001363943	NM_019764
RefSeq (protein)	NP_001265612; NP_001265614; NP_057285; NP_001350872	NP_062738
Location (UCSC)	Chr 3: 134.36 – 134.38 Mb	Chr 9: 102.59 – 102.61 Mb
PubMed search
- Wikidata
View/Edit Human	View/Edit Mouse

Angiomotin-like protein 2 is a protein that in humans is encoded by the AMOTL2 gene.

Angiomotin is a protein that binds angiostatin, a circulating inhibitor of the formation of new blood vessels (angiogenesis). Angiomotin mediates angiostatin inhibition of endothelial cell migration and tube formation in vitro. The protein encoded by this gene is related to angiomotin and is a member of the motins protein family.
