= Myelin basic protein =

MBP

Identifiers
- Aliases: MBP, myelin basic protein
- External IDs: OMIM: 159430; MGI: 96925; GeneCards: MBP
Available structures
PDB	Ortholog search: PDBe RCSB
PDB	List of PDB id codes 1ZGL, 1BX2, 1FV1, 1HQR, 1K2D, 1YMM

Gene location (Human)
Chr.	Chromosome 18 (human)
Band	18q23	Start	76,978,827 bp
Band	18q23	End	77,133,683 bp

Gene location (Mouse)
Chr.	Chromosome 18 (mouse)
Band	18 E3|18 55.84 cM	Start	82,493,271 bp
Band	18 E3|18 55.84 cM	End	82,603,762 bp
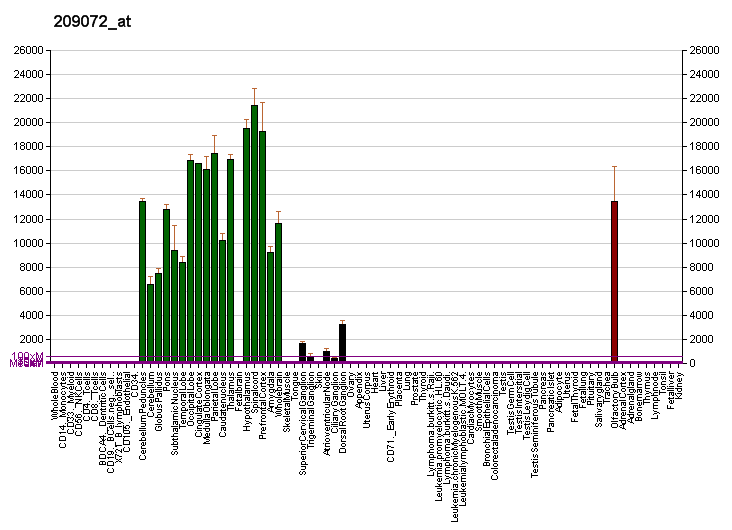

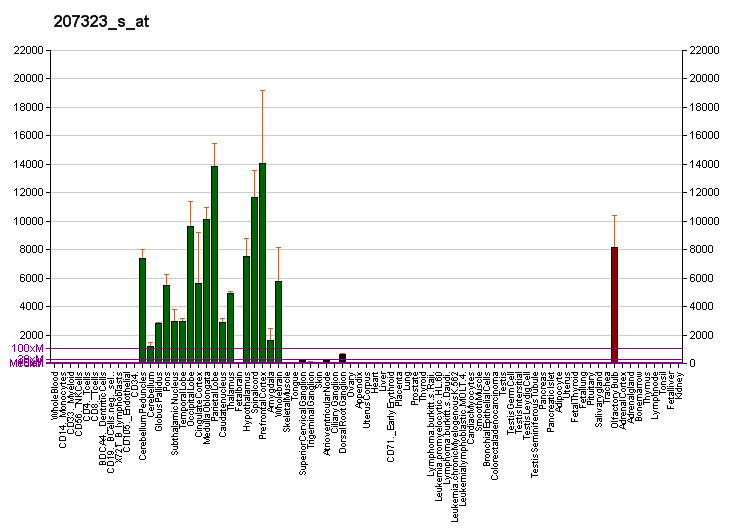
RNA expression pattern
Bgee	Human / Mouse (ortholog); Top expressed in: pons; external globus pallidus; inferior ganglion of vagus nerve; superior vestibular nucleus; C1 segment; subthalamic nucleus; pars reticulata; optic nerve; inferior olivary nucleus; dorsal motor nucleus of vagus nerve / Top expressed in: globus pallidus; lateral geniculate nucleus; medial geniculate nucleus; deep cerebellar nuclei; dorsal tegmental nucleus; pontine nuclei; lateral hypothalamus; medial vestibular nucleus; ventral tegmental area; substantia nigra; More reference expression data
BioGPS	More reference expression data
Gene ontology
Molecular function	protein binding; protease binding; calmodulin binding; structural constituent of myelin sheath
Cellular component	nucleus; cell projection; membrane; plasma membrane; intracellular anatomical structure; internode region of axon; soma; myelin sheath; compact myelin; cell periphery; cell surface; protein-containing complex
Biological process	chemical synaptic transmission; membrane organization; central nervous system development; axon ensheathment; substantia nigra development; response to toxic substance; immune response; hearing; MAPK cascade; negative regulation of heterotypic cell-cell adhesion; maintenance of blood-brain barrier; myelination; positive regulation of metalloendopeptidase activity
Sources:Amigo / QuickGO
Orthologs
Databases	NCBI: entry; OMA: entry
Species	Human	Mouse
Entrez	4155	17196
Ensembl	ENSG00000197971	ENSMUSG00000041607
UniProt	P02686	P04370
RefSeq (mRNA)	NM_001025081; NM_001025090; NM_001025092; NM_001025094; NM_001025098 NM_001025100; NM_001025101; NM_002385	NM_001025245; NM_001025251; NM_001025254; NM_001025255; NM_001025256 NM_001025258; NM_001025259; NM_010777
RefSeq (protein)	NP_001020252; NP_001020261; NP_001020263; NP_001020271; NP_001020272 NP_002376	NP_001020416; NP_001020422; NP_001020425; NP_001020426; NP_001020427 NP_001020429; NP_001020430; NP_034907
Location (UCSC)	Chr 18: 76.98 – 77.13 Mb	Chr 18: 82.49 – 82.6 Mb
PubMed search
- Wikidata
View/Edit Human	View/Edit Mouse

Myelin_MBP

Identifiers
- Symbol: Myelin_MBP
- Pfam: PF01669
- InterPro: IPR000548
- PROSITE: PDOC00492
- SCOP2: 1bx2 / SCOPe / SUPFAM
- OPM superfamily: 274
- OPM protein: 2lug
Available protein structures:
- PDB: IPR000548 PF01669 (ECOD; PDBsum)
- AlphaFold: IPR000548; PF01669

Myelin basic protein (MBP) is a protein important in the process of myelination of nerves in the nervous system. The myelin sheath is a multi-layered membrane, unique to the nervous system, that functions as an insulator to greatly increase the velocity of axonal impulse conduction. MBP maintains the correct structure of myelin, interacting with the lipids in the myelin membrane.

MBP was initially sequenced in 1971 after isolation from bovine myelin membranes. MBP knockout mice called shiverer mice were subsequently developed and characterized in the early 1980s. Shiverer mice exhibit decreased amounts of CNS myelination and a progressive disorder characterized by tremors, seizures, and early death. The human gene for MBP is on chromosome 18; the protein localizes to the CNS and to various cells of the hematopoietic lineage.

The pool of MBP in the central nervous system is very diverse, with several splice variants being expressed and a large number of post-translational modifications on the protein, which include phosphorylation, methylation, deamidation, and citrullination. These forms differ by the presence or the absence of short (10 to 20 residues) peptides in various internal locations in the sequence. In general, the major form of MBP is a protein of about 18.5 Kd (170 residues).

== Gene expression ==
The protein encoded by the classic MBP gene is a major constituent of the myelin sheath of oligodendrocytes and Schwann cells in the nervous system. However, MBP-related transcripts are also present in the bone marrow and the immune system. These mRNAs arise from the long MBP gene (otherwise called "Golli-MBP") that contains three additional exons located upstream of the classic MBP exons. Alternative splicing from the Golli and the MBP transcription start sites gives rise to two sets of MBP-related transcripts and gene products. The Golli mRNAs contain three exons unique to Golli-MBP, spliced in-frame to one or more MBP exons. They encode hybrid proteins that have an N-terminal Golli amino acid sequence linked to the MBP amino acid sequence. The second family of transcripts contains only MBP exons and produces the well-characterized myelin basic proteins. This complex gene structure is conserved among species, suggesting that the MBP transcription unit is an integral part of the Golli transcription unit and that this arrangement is important for the function and/or regulation of these genes. At protein level, the concentration of MBP in the CNS is tenfold higher in sections of white matter compared with cerebral cortex. In melanocytic cell types, MBP gene expression may be regulated by MITF.

== Structure ==
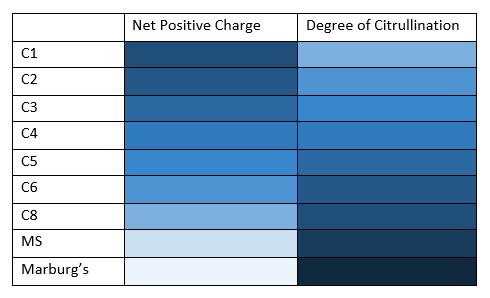
MBP charge and citrullination

Myelin basic protein has been classified as an intrinsically disordered protein that has no stable secondary structure in solution. Like most IDPs, it has a high net charge and a low mean hydrophobicity, minimizing the hydrophobic effect that drives traditional protein folding. It does contain some exceptions to normal IDP amino acid content. For example, MBP has more arginine and less glutamic acid than most IDPs. However, this is likely because those changes are necessary for MBP to be sufficiently basic and positively charged to correctly interact with the membrane. Notably, MBP has been shown to adopt a more stable secondary structure on interaction with lipids. NMR and Cys-specific spin labeling experiments have predicted this structure to contain beta sheet and regions of amphipathic helix.

As implied by its name, myelin basic protein is significantly basic, with an isoelectric point of 10. It is thought to associate with the cell membrane through electrostatic interactions between its positive charges and negatively charged phospholipid heads of the plasma membrane. It can undergo a large variety of post-translational modifications, creating various charge isomers known as C1-C6 or C8. These modifications include phosphorylation, methylation, deamidation, citrullination, ADP-ribosylation, and N-terminal acylation. C1 is the least modified, while C8 is the most distinct, containing 6-11 additional citrullinations. Since each of these decreases its positive charge, C8 has the smallest net positive charge of the isomers. Alternations in these post-translational modifications have been associated with demyelinating diseases. Notably, MBP isolated from individuals with multiple sclerosis have had a higher degree of citrullination and a smaller positive charge. In a rare, severe form of MS known as Marburg's syndrome, the citrullination was even more extensive.

== Role in disease ==
Interest in MBP has centered on its role in demyelinating diseases, in particular, multiple sclerosis (MS). The target antigen of the autoimmune response in MS has not yet been identified. However, several studies have shown a role for antibodies against MBP in the pathogenesis of MS. Some studies have linked a genetic predisposition to MS to the MBP gene, though a majority have not.

A "molecular mimicry" hypothesis of multiple sclerosis has been suggested, in which T cells are, in essence, confusing MBP with human herpesvirus-6. Researchers in the United States created a synthetic peptide with a sequence identical to that of an HHV-6 peptide. Elevated levels of MBP have been found in the cerebrospinal fluid of patients with HIV infections and signs of encephalopathy, and although MBP does not seem to be a sensitive diagnostic marker of HIV encephalopathy, it has been suggested that it may serve a role as a prognostic indicator of disease progression. It is able to show that T cells were activated by this peptide. These activated T cells also recognized and initiated an immune response against a synthetically created peptide sequence that is identical to part of human MBP. During their research, they found that the levels of these cross-reactive T cells are significantly elevated in multiple sclerosis patients.

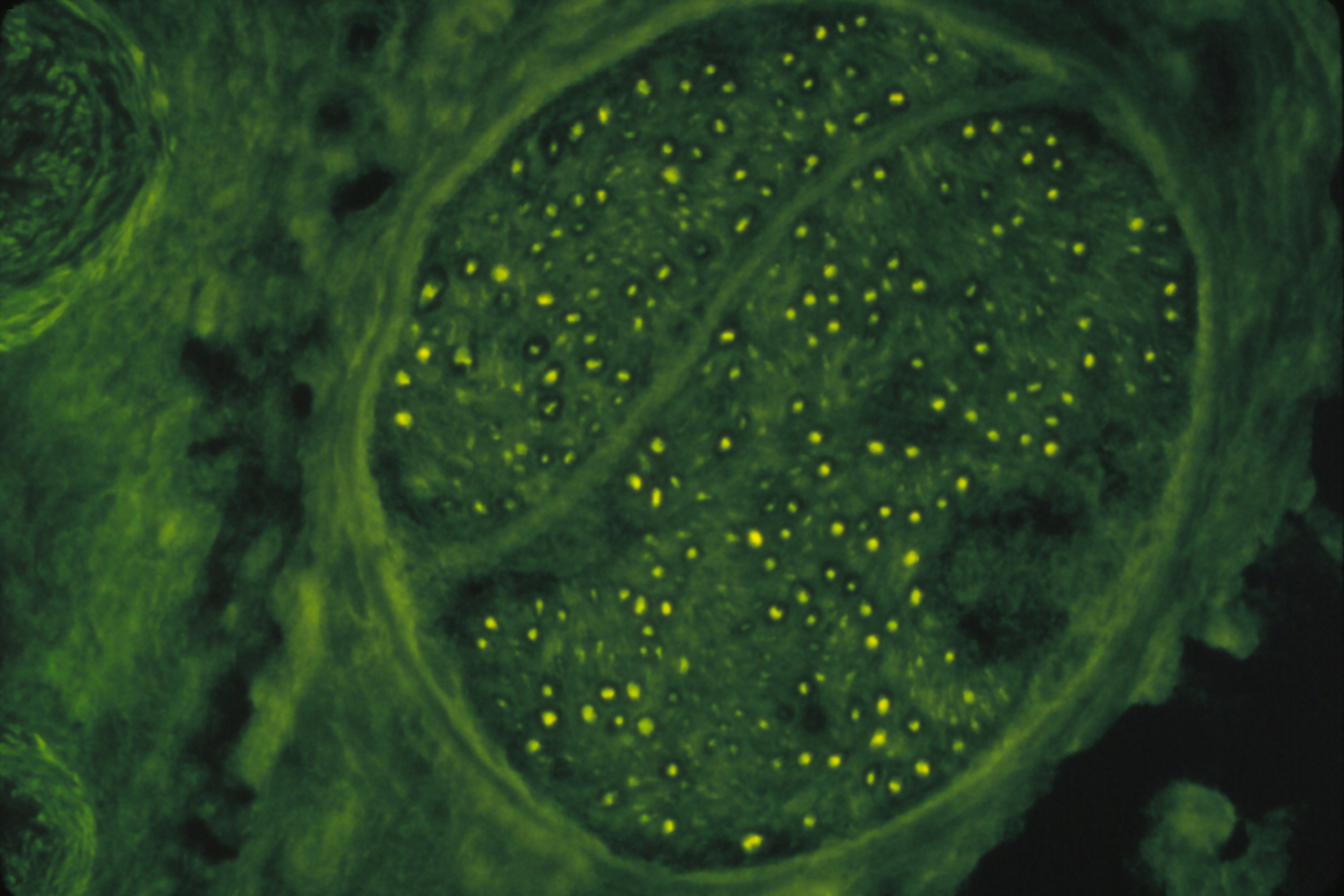

Some research has shown that inoculating an animal with MBP to generate an MBP-specific immune response against it increases blood–brain barrier permeability. Permeability is enhanced when the animal is inoculated against non-specific proteins.

A targeted immune response to MBP has been implicated in lethal rabies infection. The inoculation of MBP generates increases the permeability of the blood–brain barrier (BBB), allowing immune cells to enter the brain, the primary site of rabies virus replication. In a study of mice infected with Silver-haired bat rabies virus (SHBRV), the mortality rate of mice treated with MBP improved 20%-30% over the untreated control group. It is significant to note that healthy uninfected mice treated with MBP showed an increase in mortality rate between 0% and 40%.

== Interactions ==
Myelin basic protein has been shown to interact in vivo with proteolipid protein 1, and in vitro with calmodulin, actin, tropomyosin, tubulin, clathrin, 2',3'-cyclic-nucleotide 3'-phosphodiesterase and multiple molecules of the immune system.
