= NG2 proteoglycan =

Neural/glial antigen 2, or NG2, is a rat integral membrane proteoglycan found in the plasma membrane of many diverse cell types. Homologous proteins in other species include human CSPG4, also known as melanoma-associated chondroitin sulfate proteoglycan (MCSP), Mouse AN2, and Sea urchin ECM3. This single-pass transmembrane molecule may be plasma membrane-bound or secreted and associated with the extracellular matrix. It is believed to play a role in functions such as cell adhesion, cell-cell and cell-ECM communication, migration and metastasis, proliferation, and axonal growth, guidance and regeneration. NG2-positive cells include oligodendrocyte progenitor cells (OPCs) and other progenitor cell populations, such as chondroblasts, myoblasts, and pericytes, as well as several different tumors including glioblastoma multiforme and melanoma.

== Structure ==
NG2 cDNA contains 8,071 nucleotides corresponding to 2,325 amino acids. The entire protein is divided into three domains: a large extracellular domain (2,224 amino acids), a single transmembrane domain (25 amino acids), and a short cytoplasmic tail (76 amino acids). The extracellular domain is further subdivided into three subdomains: an N-terminal globular domain that contains several cysteines and is stabilized by intrachain disulfide bonds; a central domain to which the chondroitin sulfate moiety covalently binds; and a juxtamembrane domain also containing several cysteines. The core NG2 molecule is approximately 300 kDa and the addition of at least one chondroitin sulfate molecule results in a molecule that is 400 – 800 kDa.

== Localization ==
NG2 is found both in the central nervous system (CNS) and peripherally in a variety of tissues. In the CNS, NG2 may be found on pericytes, various tumors including glioblastoma, and a population of progenitor cells known as polydendrocytes or oligodendrocyte precursor cells (OPCs). Peripherally, NG2 is found on chondroblasts, cardiomyocytes, aortic smooth muscle cells, myoblasts, and several different human tumors, including melanoma. Recently, when co-localized with S100β, NG2 has been shown to be a marker of terminal, or perisynaptic, Schwann cells at the neuromuscular junction. Although NG2 is a single-pass transmembrane protein, it may also be released by proteolytic cleavage into the extracellular space where it associates with the extracellular matrix (ECM). The levels of NG2 have been shown to increase rapidly at areas of injury in the CNS, including in the area of the glial scar of spinal cord contusion injury.

== Interacting molecules ==
NG2 interacts via its large extracellular domain with many factors in the extracellular space. Within its central extracellular domain, NG2 has a binding site for Type VI collagen as well as PDGF-AA. At its juxtamembrane domain, NG2 may interact with bFGF.
