= Judah Folkman =

American surgeon and research biologist (1933–2008)

- Born: February 24, 1933; Cleveland, Ohio, U.S.
- Died: January 14, 2008 (aged 74); Denver, Colorado, U.S.
- Education: Ohio State University; Harvard Medical School
- Known for: Angiogenesis
- Awards: Charles S. Mott Prize (1997); Massry Prize (1997); Keio Medical Science Prize (1998); Wolf Prize in Medicine (1992)
- Scientific career
- Fields: Pediatric surgery
- Institutions: Harvard Medical School
- Notable students: Robert S. Langer, Donald E. Ingber, Marsha A. Moses

Moses Judah Folkman (February 24, 1933 – January 14, 2008) was an American biologist and pediatric surgeon best known for his research on tumor angiogenesis, the process by which a tumor attracts blood vessels to nourish itself and sustain its existence. He founded the field of angiogenesis research, which has led to the discovery of a number of therapies based on inhibiting or stimulating neovascularization.

== Early life ==
Born in 1933 in Cleveland, Ohio, Judah Folkman accompanied his father, a rabbi of Austrian-Jewish descent, on visits to hospital patients. By age seven, he knew he wanted to be a doctor rather than follow in his father's footsteps, so he could offer cures in addition to comfort. His father replied, "In that case, you can be a rabbi-like doctor," words his son took to heart.

Folkman graduated from Ohio State University in 1953, and then Harvard Medical School in 1957. While a student at Harvard Medical School, he trained under Robert Edward Gross and also worked on a prototype pacemaker, work that he never published.

In 1960, his residency was interrupted when he was drafted in the United States Navy and did research for the Navy until 1962 at the National Naval Medical Center in Bethesda, Maryland. During that time, he studied the use of silastic for the sustained release of lipophilic drugs; the 1964 publication of that work helped inspire the technological development of the Norplant implantable contraceptive at the Population Council.

The navy research was focused on developing artificial blood; in the course of testing potential products to see if they could keep alive thymus glands taken from rabbits, he noticed that tumors in the gland could not grow as they did if the glands were perfused with blood. His curiosity as to why led to his work on angiogenesis.

After his two years work for the navy, Folkman completed his residency at Massachusetts General Hospital. He worked as an assistant surgeon at Boston City Hospital, then trained further in pediatric surgery at Children's Hospital of Philadelphia under C. Everett Koop.

== Career ==
In 1967 he was appointed surgeon-in-chief of Children's Hospital Boston at the age of 34. Folkman was appointed the Julia Dyckman Andrus Professor of Pediatric Surgery at Harvard Medical School in 1968, where he was also Professor of Cell Biology. He was the youngest full Professor in the history of Harvard Medical School. In addition to directing the Children's Hospital Boston Surgical Research Laboratories, which grew to become the Vascular Biology Program, for nearly four decades, he was the Scientific Director of the hospital's Vascular Anomalies Center.

In 1971, he reported in the New England Journal of Medicine that solid tumors are angiogenesis-dependent. He hypothesized that there was an unknown "factor" that tumors secreted to help it increase its blood supply, and that if that factor could be blocked, tumors would wither and die. Though his hypothesis was initially disregarded and treated with skepticism by most experts in the field, Folkman persisted with his research. He and collaborators, who included Bert L. Vallee, soon identified the already-known fibroblast growth factor as an angiogenic factor, but the team's work showed that there were additional, unknown factors. To help accelerate the work, Folkman started collaborating with industry. In 1974 Harvard University and Monsanto signed a ten-year industrial-funded research grant to support his cancer research, which at that time was the largest such arrangement ever made; medical inventions arising from that research were the first for which Harvard allowed its faculty to submit a patent application. Robert Langer worked as a postdoc in Folkman's lab during this time, concentrating on using silastic and other materials to deliver drugs.

In the mid to late 1980s, two other angiogenic factors were identified by other labs that had been inspired by his work: angiogenin and VEGF. With the factors identified, drug discovery could begin. When the Monsanto agreement (which yielded no products for Monsanto) ended, Folkman started receiving research funding from Takeda and then from a startup company, Entremed, that put half its venture capital funding into research in the Folkman lab.

Donald E. Ingber soon discovered that a fungus, Aspergillus fumigatus, secreted a chemical, fumagillin, that inhibited angiogenesis. Takeda performed medicinal chemistry to optimize it, leading to development of TNP-470. Folkman's team later tested it in adults with hemangiomas; they also used interferon alpha, an already approved drug that they had already shown to be an angiogenesis inhibitor, to treat infants with hemangiomas in some of the first clinical trials of angiogenesis inhibitors which were published in 1992. In these trials they also studied the levels of fibroblast growth factor in the urine of the trial subjects and published that work in 1994; these were some of the first explorations of the use of biomarkers in clinical trials as surrogate endpoints.

In 1991 Michael O"Reilly, working in the Folkman lab with Entremed funding, discovered the first endogenous angiogenesis inhibitor, angiostatin and then another, endostatin. Entremed began developing them and soon struck a collaboration with Bristol-Myers, which caught national interest and spurred further investment in angiogenesis inhibitors by other pharma companies.

In 1993 he surprised the scientific world by hypothesizing that angiogenesis is as important in blood cancers as it is in solid tumors, and the next year he published work showing that a biomarker of angiogenesis was higher in all people with cancer, but especially high in people with blood cancers, and other evidence of the role of angiogenesis in blood cancers emerged as well. Meanwhile, a member of his lab, Robert D'Amato, was looking for angiogenesis inhibitors, and discovered that thalidomide inhibited angiogenesis in 1994. Around that time, the wife of a man who was dying of multiple myeloma and whom standard treatments had failed, called Folkman asking him about his anti-angiogenesis ideas. Folkman convinced the patient's doctor to try thalidomide, and that doctor ended up conducting a clinical trial of thalidomide for people with multiple myeloma in which about a third of the subjects responded to the treatment. The results of that trial were published in the New England Journal of Medicine in 1999.

In 2004, the first angiogenesis inhibitor, bevacizumab (Avastin), was approved by the FDA, as a treatment for colon cancer. It is a recombinant humanized monoclonal antibody that was discovered and developed by Napoleone Ferrara, a scientist at Genentech. A similar drug, Lucentis, was later approved for treating macular degeneration. After further work was done by Celgene and others, in 2006 the U.S. Food and Drug Administration granted accelerated approval for thalidomide in combination with dexamethasone for the treatment of newly diagnosed multiple myeloma patients.

== Awards ==
Folkman was a member of the National Academy of Sciences, the Institute of Medicine, the American Academy of Arts and Sciences, and the American Philosophical Society, among others. He was the author of some 400 papers and more than 100 book chapters and monographs and received scores of United States awards and honors for his research as well as numerous international awards, including the George Ledlie Prize from Harvard, Canada's Gairdner Foundation International Award, Israel's Wolf Prize, Germany's Ernst Schering Prize, the United Kingdom Society for Endocrinology's Dale Medal in 2000, Prince of Asturias Award, the Golden Plate Award of the American Academy of Achievement and Switzerland's Dr. Josef Steiner Cancer Research Award. In 2005 he was awarded the Scientific Grand Prize of the Lefoulon-Delalande Foundation.

He was awarded the Massry Prize from the Keck School of Medicine, University of Southern California in 1997. On May 29, 1998, Folkman received an honorary doctorate from the Faculty of Medicine at Uppsala University, Sweden

== Death and legacy ==
Folkman died of a heart attack in Denver on January 14, 2008, at the age of 74 en route to deliver the 2008 Keynote Address at the Keystone Symposia (Molecular Mechanisms of Angiogenesis in Development and Disease) in Vancouver, British Columbia.

He was survived by his wife, Paula, whom he met and married while doing his surgical residency, two daughters, and a granddaughter.
