= Anna Molofsky =

American psychiatrist and glial biologist

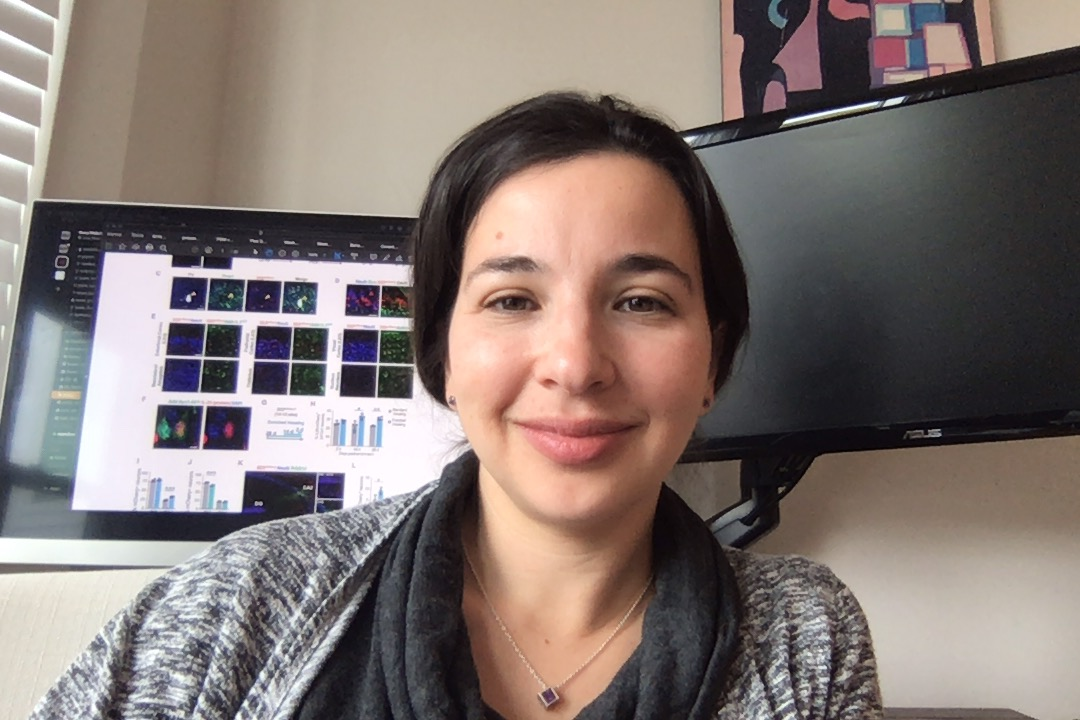
- Anna Molofsky in 2020
- Education: University of Michigan (MD, PhD); Amherst College (BA)
- Known for: Astrocyte regulation of microglia behavior
- Awards: 2017 Pew Scholar in Biomedical Science, NIH New Innovator Award
- Scientific career
- Fields: Neuroscience; Neuroimmunology
- Institutions: UCSF Weill Institute for Neurosciences
- Website: annamolofskylab.org

Anna V. Molofsky is an American psychiatrist and glial biologist. She is a Samuel Barondes Chair professor in the department of psychiatry at UC San Francisco. Her lab currently studies the communication between astrocytes, microglia, and neurons to understand how these signals regulate synaptic development in health and disease.

== Early life and education ==
Molofsky completed her undergraduate education at Amherst College, majoring in neuroscience and chemistry. Next, she pursued an MD-PhD at the University of Michigan-Ann Arbor through the NIH funded Medical Scientist Training Program. During her PhD, Molofsky focused her training in CNS stem cell renewal and investigated glial heterogeneity under the mentorship of Sean Morrison. Molofsky then continued her clinical training with a residency in adult psychiatry at UC San Francisco followed by postdoctoral training in the lab of David Rowitch.

== Career and research ==
In 2015, Molofsky started her lab at UC San Francisco. The Molofsky Lab investigates the communication between astrocytes, microglia, and neurons and how this communication shapes synapse formation during development. Her lab discovered a novel function of Interleukin-33 in which astrocytic release of this cytokine helps regulate microglial synaptic pruning during development and maintain synapse homeostasis. Molofsky is also dedicated to characterizing astrocyte heterogeneity and further understanding their unique roles in neural circuit function and in neuroinflammation.

== Selected publications ==
- Bennett FC, Molofsky AV. The immune system and psychiatric disease: a basic science perspective (2019). Clin Exp Immunol. 197: 294–307.
- Vainchtein ID*, Chin G*, Cho FS, Kelley KW, Miller JG, Chien EC, Liddelow SA, Nguyen PT, Nakao-Inoue H, Dorman LC, Akil O, Joshita S, Barres BA, Paz JT, Molofsky AB, Molofsky AV (2018). Astrocyte-derived interleukin-33 promotes microglial synapse engulfment and neural circuit development. Science 359: 1269–1273.
- Kelley KW, Nakao-Inoue H, Molofsky AV, Oldham M (2018) Variation among intact tissue samples reveals the core transcriptional features of human CNS cell classes. Nature Neuroscience 21:1171–1184.
- Poskanzer KE and Molofsky AV (2018) Dynamism of an Astrocyte In Vivo: Perspectives on Identity and Function. Ann Rev Physiol 80: 143–157.

== Selected awards ==
- 2006 Harold M. Weintraub Graduate Student Award, Fred Hutchinson Cancer Center
- 2007 Dean's Award for Research Excellence, University of Michigan Medical School
- 2013 APA-Pfizer MD/PhD Psychiatric Research Fellowship, American Psychiatric Association
- 2014 ACNP Travel Award, American College of Neuropsychopharmacology
- 2015 Career Award for Medical Scientists, Burroughs Wellcome Fund
- 2016 Young Investigator Award, Brain and Behavior Research Foundation
- 2019 NIH New Innovator Award
- 2017 Pew Scholar in Biomedical Science
- 2019 Joseph Altman Award in Developmental Neuroscience, Japanese Neuroscience Society
- 2019 Freedman Award in Basic Research, Brain and Behavior Research Foundation
