= Angiomotin =

Protein-coding gene in the species Homo sapiens

AMOT

Identifiers
- Aliases: AMOT, angiomotin
- External IDs: OMIM: 300410; MGI: 108440; GeneCards: AMOT

Gene location (Mouse)
Chr.	X chromosome (mouse)
Band	X|X F2	Start	144,229,421 bp
Band	X|X F2	End	144,288,177 bp
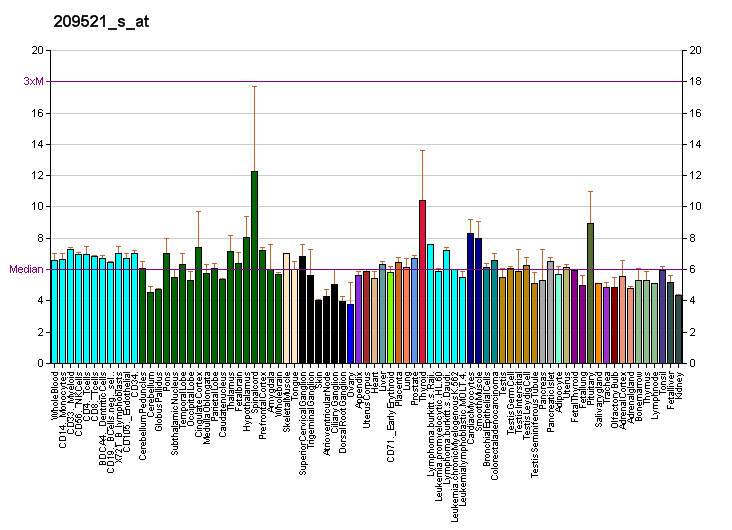
RNA expression pattern
Bgee	Human / Mouse (ortholog); Top expressed in: middle frontal gyrus; Brodmann area 10; frontal pole; secondary oocyte; gastrocnemius muscle; amygdala; caudate nucleus; ganglionic eminence; nucleus accumbens; putamen / Top expressed in: primitive streak; extraocular muscle; saccule; mandibular prominence; otic placode; digastric muscle; internal carotid artery; extensor digitorum longus muscle; soleus muscle; sternocleidomastoid muscle; More reference expression data
BioGPS	More reference expression data
Gene ontology
Molecular function	protein binding; angiostatin binding; identical protein binding; signaling receptor activity
Cellular component	cytoplasm; integral component of membrane; cytosol; ruffle; endocytic vesicle; stress fiber; cell surface; actin filament; COP9 signalosome; cytoplasmic vesicle; external side of plasma membrane; lamellipodium; bicellular tight junction; nucleus; cell junction
Biological process	regulation of cell migration; blood vessel morphogenesis; blood vessel endothelial cell migration; gastrulation with mouth forming second; in utero embryonic development; hippo signaling; vasculogenesis; establishment of cell polarity involved in ameboidal cell migration; chemotaxis; negative regulation of GTPase activity; positive regulation of blood vessel endothelial cell migration; cell-cell junction assembly; positive regulation of cell size; negative regulation of angiogenesis; cell migration involved in gastrulation; positive regulation of embryonic development; regulation of small GTPase mediated signal transduction; positive regulation of stress fiber assembly; negative regulation of vascular permeability; actin cytoskeleton organization; angiogenesis
Sources:Amigo / QuickGO
Orthologs
Databases	NCBI: entry
Species	Human	Mouse
Entrez	154796	27494
Ensembl	n/a	ENSMUSG00000041688
UniProt	Q4VCS5	Q8VHG2
RefSeq (mRNA)	NM_001113490; NM_133265; NM_001386998; NM_001386999	NM_001290274; NM_153319
RefSeq (protein)	NP_001106962; NP_573572	NP_001277203; NP_695231; NP_001390315; NP_001390316; NP_001390317 NP_001390318
Location (UCSC)	n/a	Chr X: 144.23 – 144.29 Mb
PubMed search
- Wikidata
View/Edit Human	View/Edit Mouse

Angiomotin (AMOT) is a protein that in humans is encoded by the AMOT gene. It belongs to the motin family of angiostatin binding proteins, which includes angiomotin, angiomotin-like 1 (AMOTL1) and angiomotin-like 2 (AMOTL2) characterized by coiled-coil domains at N-terminus and consensus PDZ-binding domain at the C-terminus. Angiomotin is expressed predominantly in endothelial cells of capillaries as well as angiogenic tissues such as placenta and solid tumor.

== Discovery ==
Angiomotin was discovered in 2001 by screening a placenta yeast two-hybrid cDNA library for angiostatin-binding peptides, using a construct encoding the kringle domains 1-4 of angiostatin.

== Gene location ==
AMOT gene is located on human chromosome X:112,021,794-112,066,354, containing 3252 nucleotides in coding sequence as 11 exons.

== Protein structure ==
Two splice isoforms are known for angiomotin: p80 and p130. The alternative splicing is somewhat tissue specific. Cells expressing p130 contained more actin than those expressing p80. p80 is not the product of cleavage of p130, as p130 contains no potential proteolytic cleavage site for such conversion.

Angiomotin p80 is a 72.54 kD protein of 675 residues, characterized by conserved N-terminal coiled coil domains and C-terminal PDZ binding motifs, with angiostatin binding domain (ABD) located in the central region. It is hypothesized that the ABD is extracellular, while the coiled-coil and the PDZ binding domain are intracellular. The PDZ-binding motif of angiomotin serves as a protein recognition site and deletion of as few as three amino acids from the C-terminal results in complete loss of pro-migratory activity, and endothelial cells expressing such mutant angiomotin failed to migrate or form tubes.

Angiomotin p130 differs from p80 by having an N-terminal cytoplasmic extension of 409 amino acids rich in glutamine, which mediates the binding of p130 to F-actin and tight cell-cell junctions. This binding remains after destabilizing actin with cytochalasin B.

Like other surface-associated proteins that can bind plasminogen and its derivatives, angiomotin does not appear to have a signal sequence, thus its association with the cell surface may be via protein–protein interaction usually referred to as non-classic secretion.

== Function ==
=== Role in cell motility and angiogenesis ===
Expression of angiomotin p80 in endothelial cells increases the random migration of endothelial cells, as well as the migration of endothelial cells toward growth factors, e.g. bFGF, VEGF and LPA etc. Angiomotin also mediates tube formation of endothelial cells. Angiomotin promotes angiogenesis by both stimulating cell spreading and stabilizing established tubes, e.g. in mouse aortic endothelial (MAE) cells the tubes remained stable for over 30 days, while control tubes started to regress after 3 days. In the presence of angiostatin, endothelial cells expressing angiomotin p80 exhibit reduction in migration as well as reduction in tubules formation in vitro. These observations are consistent with the localization of angiomotin in the leading edge of migrating cells. Angiostatin therefore, is an inhibitor of angiomotin.

Angiomotin p80 locates and binds angiostatin on the cell surface. In primary endothelial of Chinese hamster ovary, it localizes to cell-cell junction, recruits ZO-1 and interacts with MAGI-1. It may play a role in the assembly of endothelial cell-cell junctions, as well.

Angiomotin p130 does not promote cell migration, nor responds to angiostatin. It localizes to cell-cell junction like p80 and regulates paracellular permeability. Its N-terminal domain localizes to actin fibers and stabilizes them, and this effect is not affected by angiostatin. Transfection of p130 angiomotin into MAE cells results in change in cell shape, increased average cell size and stress fiber formation. So p80 is involved in cell migration and expressed during migratory phase. While p130 controls cell shape by interaction with actin, and is expressed during the period of blood vessel stabilization and maturation. The relative expression levels of p80 and p130 regulate a switch between a migratory and a non-migratory cell phenotype, where homo-oligomerization of p80 and hetero-oligomerization of both isoforms are critical for this regulation.

=== Role in Hippo signaling pathway ===
AMOT, AMOTL1 and AMOTL2 play critical roles in the Hippo signaling pathway by regulating the subcellular localization of the co-activators YAP (Yes-associated protein) and TAZ (transcriptional co-activator with PDZ-binding motif), and activating LATS2 through a novel conserved domain. The activity of YAP and TAZ can be restricted through their interaction with AMOT and AMOTL1, and such interaction depends on the WW domain of TAZ and the Proline-Proline-x–Tyrosine motif at the N-terminus of AMOT.

In position-dependent Hippo signaling, where the outer and inner cells are polar and nonpolar respectively, AMOT and AMOTL2 are essential for Hippo pathway activation and appropriate cell fate specification. In the nonpolar inner cells, AMOT localizes to adherens junctions (AJs), and Ser-176 at the N-terminal domain is phosphorylated by LATS downstream of GPCR signaling, which inhibits actin binding activity and stabilizes the AMOT-LATS interaction to activate the Hippo pathway. Thus, AMOT is a direct substrate of LATS and its phosphorylation at Ser-176 inhibits cell migration and angiogenesis. In the outer cells, the cell polarity sequesters AMOT from basolateral adherens junctions to apical domains, thereby suppressing Hippo signaling. It is therefore proposed AMOT acts as a molecular switch for Hippo pathway and links F-actin with LATS activity.

Along the Hippo pathway, AMOT's binding to Merlin releases its auto-inhibition and promotes Merlin's binding to LATS1/2. Phosphorylation of Ser-518 outside the Merlin's auto-inhibitory tail prevents binding and thus inhibits Hippo pathway kinase activation. USP9x regulates the ubiquitin-mediated turnover of AMOT, and the deubiquitylation of AMOT results in its stabilization and lower YAP/TAZ activity.

== Cancer research ==
A DNA vaccination targeting angiomotin generated antibodies that detected AMOT on the endothelial cell surface, which inhibited migration. It blocked angiogenesis and prevented growth of transplanted tumors for up to 150 days in vivo. A combination of DNA vaccines encoding AMOT and the extracellular and transmembrane domains of the human EGF receptor 2 (Her-2)/neu oncogene inhibited breast cancer progression and impaired tumor vascularization in Her-2/neu transgenic mice, showing DNA vaccination targeting AMOT may be used to mimic the effect of angiostatin and no toxicity or impairment of normal blood vessels was detected.

In human breast cancer tissues, AMOT is highly expressed compared with control, and its level is associated with other angiogenesis markers. AMOT links to the proliferation and invasion of breast tumours and the long-term survival of the patients, and could be a potential target for therapy.

For melanoma, AMOT binds a variant of soluble cell adhesion molecule (sCD146) in endothelial progenitor cells (EPC). Silencing AMOT in EPC inhibits the angiogenic effect of sCD146, e.g. EPC migration, proliferation, and capacity to form capillary-like structures in Matrigel.
