= Angiomotin-like protein 1 =

Protein-coding gene in the species Homo sapiens

AMOTL1

Identifiers
- Aliases: AMOTL1, JEAP, angiomotin like 1
- External IDs: OMIM: 614657; MGI: 1922973; HomoloGene: 43977; GeneCards: AMOTL1; OMA:AMOTL1 - orthologs

Gene location (Human)
Chr.	Chromosome 11 (human)
Band	11q21	Start	94,706,431 bp
Band	11q21	End	94,876,748 bp

Gene location (Mouse)
Chr.	Chromosome 9 (mouse)
Band	9|9 A2	Start	14,453,262 bp
Band	9|9 A2	End	14,556,352 bp
RNA expression pattern
Bgee	Human / Mouse (ortholog); Top expressed in: tibialis anterior muscle; deltoid muscle; Skeletal muscle tissue of rectus abdominis; cardiac muscle tissue of right atrium; tendon of biceps brachii; body of tongue; tibia; quadriceps femoris muscle; skin of arm; vastus lateralis muscle / Top expressed in: hand; knee joint; foot; soleus muscle; temporal muscle; lateral geniculate nucleus; medial head of gastrocnemius muscle; triceps brachii muscle; sternocleidomastoid muscle; quadriceps femoris muscle; More reference expression data
BioGPS	n/a
Gene ontology
Molecular function	protein binding; identical protein binding
Cellular component	COP9 signalosome; cytosol; apical plasma membrane; cytoplasmic vesicle; lamellipodium; bicellular tight junction; cell junction
Biological process	establishment of cell polarity involved in ameboidal cell migration; Wnt signaling pathway; hippo signaling; positive regulation of blood vessel endothelial cell migration; actin cytoskeleton organization; regulation of cell migration; angiogenesis
Sources:Amigo / QuickGO
Orthologs
Species	Human	Mouse
Entrez	154810	75723
Ensembl	ENSG00000166025	ENSMUSG00000013076
UniProt	Q8IY63	Q9D4H4
RefSeq (mRNA)	NM_001301007; NM_130847	NM_001081395
RefSeq (protein)	NP_001287936; NP_570899; NP_570899.1	NP_001074864
Location (UCSC)	Chr 11: 94.71 – 94.88 Mb	Chr 9: 14.45 – 14.56 Mb
PubMed search
- Wikidata
View/Edit Human	View/Edit Mouse

Angiomotin-like protein 1 is a protein that in humans is encoded by the AMOTL1 gene.

== Function ==
The protein encoded by this gene is a peripheral membrane protein that is a component of tight junctions or TJs. TJs form an apical junctional structure and act to control paracellular permeability and maintain cell polarity. This protein is related to angiomotin, an angiostatin binding protein that regulates endothelial cell migration and capillary formation.
