= 2',3'-Cyclic-nucleotide 3'-phosphodiesterase =

Protein-coding gene in the species Homo sapiens

2′,3′-Cyclic-nucleotide 3'-phosphodiesterase

Identifiers
- EC no.: 3.1.4.37
- CAS no.: 60098-35-3

Databases
- BRENDA: enzyme data
- ExPASy: NiceZyme view
- KEGG: enzyme entry
- MetaCyc: metabolic pathway
- Rhea: reactions
- PDB structures: RCSB PDB PDBe PDBsum
- Gene Ontology: AmiGO / QuickGO
Search
- PMC: articles
- PubMed: articles
- NCBI: proteins

CNP
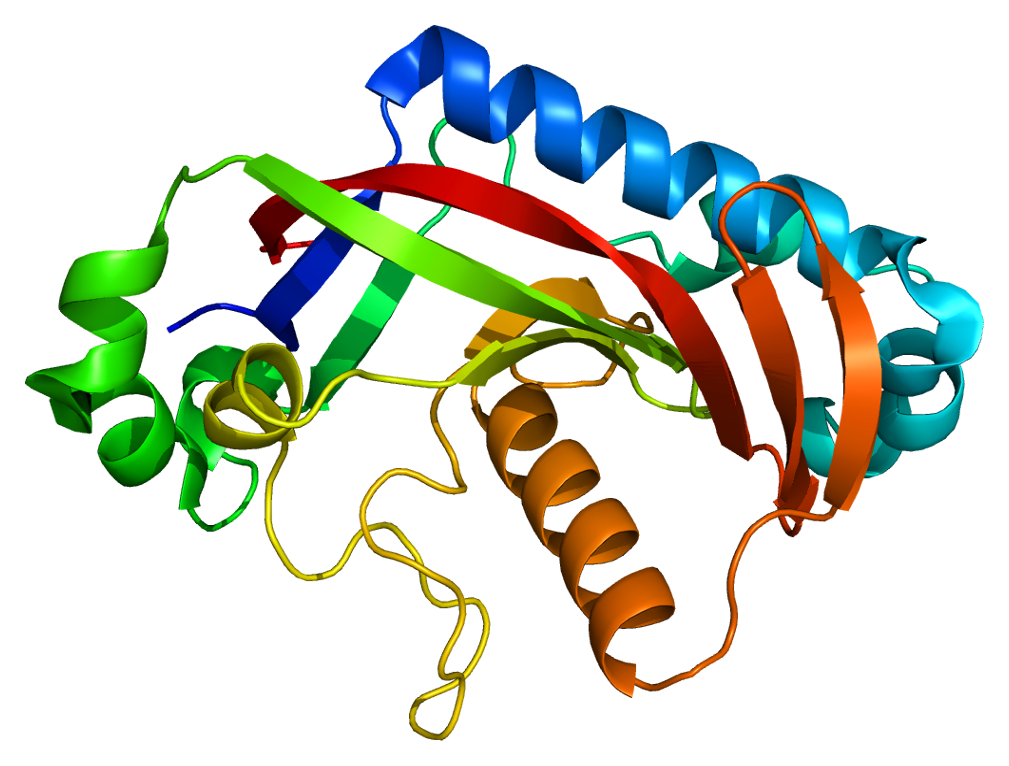

Identifiers
- Aliases: CNP, CNP1, 2',3'-cyclic nucleotide 3' phosphodiesterase, CNPase, HLD20
- External IDs: OMIM: 123830; MGI: 88437; GeneCards: CNP
Available structures
PDB	Ortholog search: PDBe RCSB
PDB	List of PDB id codes 1WOJ
Enzyme activity
EC #	BRENDA	ExPASy	KEGG	MetaCyc
3.1.4.37	↗	↗	↗	↗

Gene location (Human)
Chr.	Chromosome 17 (human)
Band	17q21.2	Start	41,966,763 bp
Band	17q21.2	End	41,977,740 bp

Gene location (Mouse)
Chr.	Chromosome 11 (mouse)
Band	11 D|11 63.47 cM	Start	100,465,730 bp
Band	11 D|11 63.47 cM	End	100,482,555 bp
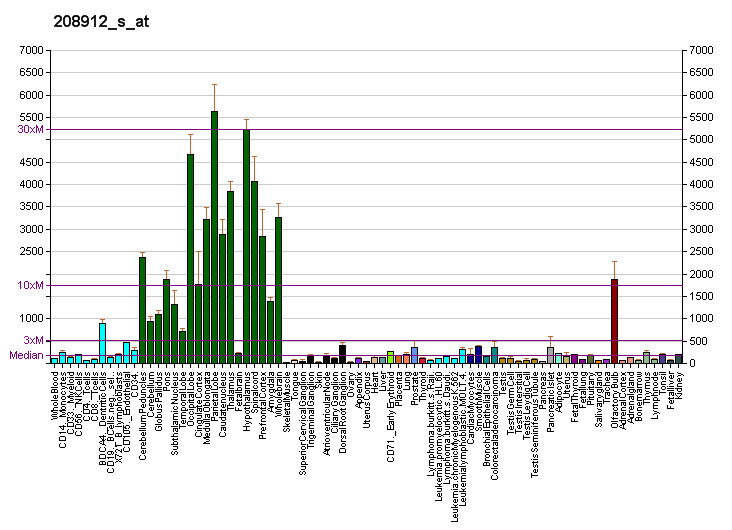
RNA expression pattern
Bgee	Human / Mouse (ortholog); Top expressed in: inferior olivary nucleus; inferior ganglion of vagus nerve; C1 segment; olfactory bulb; external globus pallidus; corpus callosum; pars reticulata; subthalamic nucleus; optic nerve; internal globus pallidus / Top expressed in: optic nerve; deep cerebellar nuclei; sciatic nerve; globus pallidus; ventral tegmental area; lateral geniculate nucleus; pontine nuclei; utricle; medial geniculate nucleus; substantia nigra; More reference expression data
BioGPS	More reference expression data
Gene ontology
Molecular function	RNA binding; hydrolase activity; cyclic nucleotide binding; 2',3'-cyclic-nucleotide 3'-phosphodiesterase activity
Cellular component	cytoplasm; cell projection; pseudopodium; membrane; melanosome; myelin sheath; plasma membrane; myelin sheath adaxonal region; myelin sheath abaxonal region; microvillus; mitochondrial outer membrane; perinuclear region of cytoplasm; mitochondrial inner membrane; microtubule; extracellular exosome; extracellular space; nucleus; nucleoplasm; cytosol
Biological process	substantia nigra development; axonogenesis; adult locomotory behavior; ageing; oligodendrocyte differentiation; response to lipopolysaccharide; regulation of mitochondrial membrane permeability; forebrain development; response to toxic substance; microtubule cytoskeleton organization; cyclic nucleotide catabolic process; chemical synaptic transmission
Sources:Amigo / QuickGO
Orthologs
Databases	NCBI: entry; OMA: entry
Species	Human	Mouse
Entrez	1267	12799
Ensembl	ENSG00000173786	ENSMUSG00000006782
UniProt	P09543	P16330
RefSeq (mRNA)	NM_033133; NM_001330216	NM_001146318; NM_009923
RefSeq (protein)	NP_001317145; NP_149124	NP_001139790; NP_034053
Location (UCSC)	Chr 17: 41.97 – 41.98 Mb	Chr 11: 100.47 – 100.48 Mb
PubMed search
- Wikidata
View/Edit Human	View/Edit Mouse

2′,3′-Cyclic-nucleotide 3'-phosphodiesterase (EC 3.1.4.37, CNPase, systematic name nucleoside-2′,3′-cyclic-phosphate 2′-nucleotidohydrolase) is an enzyme that in humans is encoded by the CNP gene.

== Reaction ==
CNPase catalyzes the following general reaction that converts nucleoside 2',3' cyclic phosphates to the corresponding 2'phosphate:

nucleoside 2′,3′-cyclic phosphate + H_{2}O $\rightleftharpoons$ nucleoside 2′-phosphate

For example, the enzyme from brain converts 2',3'-cyclic AMP to adenosine 2'-monophosphate:

2',3'-cyclic AMP
H_{2}O
adenosine 2'-monophosphate

== Function ==
CNPase is a myelin-associated enzyme that makes up 4% of total CNS myelin protein, and is thought to undergo significant age-associated changes. It is named for its ability to catalyze the phosphodiester hydrolysis of 2',3'-cyclic nucleotides to 2'-nucleotides, though a cohesive understanding of its specific physiologic functions are still ambiguous.

Structural studies have revealed that four classes of CNPases belong to one protein superfamily. CNPase's catalytic core consists of three alpha-helices and nine beta-strands. The proposed mechanism of CNPases phosphodiesterase catalytic activity is similar to the second step of the reaction mechanism for RNase A.

CNPase is expressed exclusively by oligodendrocytes in the CNS, and the appearance of CNPase seems to be one of the earliest events of oligodendrocyte differentiation. CNPase is thought to play a critical role in the events leading up to myelination.

CNPase also associates with microtubules in brain tissue and FRTL-5 thyroid cells, and is reported to have microtubule-associated protein-like activity (MAP; see MAP2), being able to catalyze microtubule formation at low molar ratios. Deletion of the C-terminus of CNPase or phosphorylation abolish the catalytic activity of microtubule formation. CNPase can link tubulin to cellular membranes, and might be involved in the regulation cytoplasmic microtubule distribution.

CNPase has also been demonstrated to inhibit the replication of HIV-1 and other primate lentiviruses by binding the retroviral Gag protein and inhibiting the genesis of nascent viral particles. Whether this is a biological function of CNPase or a coincidental activity remains unclear.
