= Mouse models of Down syndrome =

Mouse models have frequently been used to study Down syndrome due to the close similarity in the genomes of mice and humans, and the prevalence of mice usage in laboratory research.

== Background ==
Trisomy 21, an extra copy of the 21st chromosome, is responsible for causing Down syndrome, and the mouse chromosome 16 closely resembles human chromosome 21. In 1979, trisomy of the mouse chromosome 16 (Ts16) initially showed potential to be a model organism for human Down syndrome. However, Ts16 embryos rarely survive until birth, making them unable to serve as a model for behavior and postnatal development. This dissimilarity in survival between species arises from the presence of genes on mouse chromosome 16 that are not present on human chromosome 21, introducing additional gene dosage imbalances. Because of this disadvantage, more specific mouse models have been utilized.

== Ts65Dn ==
=== Model ===
The Ts65Dn mouse model was first introduced in 1993, and more specifically resembles human trisomy 21 than the Ts16 model. In Ts65Dn, cells possess an extra copy of a segment of genes on chromosome 16 as well as a segment of genes on chromosome 17. From this model, various Down syndrome phenotypes are produced, including behavioral abnormalities and cognitive defects.

=== DNA damage ===
Ts65Dn mouse muscle stem cells accumulate DNA damage. These cells also over-express a histone deubiquitinating enzyme, Usp16, which regulates the DNA damage response. These dysfunctions of muscle stem cells may impair muscle regeneration and contribute to Down syndrome pathologies.

T65Dn mice have significantly reduced numbers of hematopoietic stem cells (HSCs) along with an increase in HSC production of reactive oxygen species compared to euploid cells of wild-type littermates. Spontaneous DNA double-strand breaks are significantly increased in HSCs from Ts65Dn mice, and this correlates with significantly reduced HSC clonogenic activity compared to controls. HSCs from Ts65DN mice are also less proficient in repair of DNA double-strand breaks than cells from wild type mice. These observations suggest that an additional copy of genes on chromosome 21 may selectively impair the ability of HSCs to repair double-strand breaks, and this impairment may contribute to Down syndrome associated hematological abnormalities and malignancies.

=== Findings ===
This model was studied to understand the neurological basis of its mental impairment. It was found that it exhibited inhibition in the dentate gyrus, and that GABA_{A} antagonists were able to resolve some of this impairment. These mice were found to experience a delay in development, exhibit unusual behaviors similar to human retardation, and eventually encounter astrocytic hypertrophy and other forms of neurodegeneration. They also contained abnormally large neural synapses and other structural changes.

== Dp(16)1Yu ==
=== Model ===
The Dp(16)1Yu model (also referred to as Dp(16)1Yey) contains a partial duplication of the mouse chromosome 16 (MMU16). Unlike the Ts65Dn model, Dp(16)1Yu contains a duplication of only the parts of chromosome 16 that are homologous to human chromosome 21. This makes the Dp(16)1Yu model a more genetically accurate representation of Down Syndrome. This model presents an array of symptoms, including an increased rate of heart defects and learning and memory deficits which are comparable to symptoms seen in Down Syndrome. These mice also show an increased rate of birth defects in the pancreas (see annuler pancreas) and intestinal malrotation.

=== Findings ===
1. Pharmacotherapy for cognitive impairment in a mouse model of Down syndrome.
2. Developmental abnormalities and age-related neurodegeneration in a mouse model of Down syndrome.
3. Synaptic structural abnormalities in the Ts65Dn mouse model of down syndrome.

== Ts1Cje ==
=== Model ===
The Ts1Cje mouse model of Down Syndrome was developed at the University of California, San Francisco in 1997. This model has a partial triplication of MMU 16 that is smaller than the triplicated region in the Ts65Dn model. Ts1Cje triplication contains what has been identified as the Down Syndrome Critical Region, a region involved in all forms of DS. Ts1Cje mice have three copies of the distal portion of MMU16 from the genes Sod1 to Mx1. However, the Sod1 gene does not have three active copies.

==== Findings ====
1. Both female and male Ts1Cje mice are fertile.
2. Unlike Ts65Dn mice, Ts1Cje mice show more deficits in spatial than non-spatial learning.
3. Ts1Cje mice do not display the age related decline in BFCN neurons typical of Ts65Dn mice.
4. Expression of Jak-STAT signalling pathway genes has been characterized throughout development in Ts1Cje mice.
