= OLIG2 =

Protein found in humans

Identifiers
- Aliases: OLIG2, BHLHB1, OLIGO2, PRKCBP2, RACK17, bHLHe19, oligodendrocyte lineage transcription factor 2, oligodendrocyte transcription factor 2
- External IDs: OMIM: 606386; MGI: 1355331; GeneCards: OLIG2

Gene location (Human)
Chr.	Chromosome 21 (human)
Band	21q22.11	Start	33,025,935 bp
Band	21q22.11	End	33,029,196 bp

Gene location (Mouse)
Chr.	Chromosome 16 (mouse)
Band	16 C3.3|16 52.6 cM	Start	91,022,345 bp
Band	16 C3.3|16 52.6 cM	End	91,025,565 bp
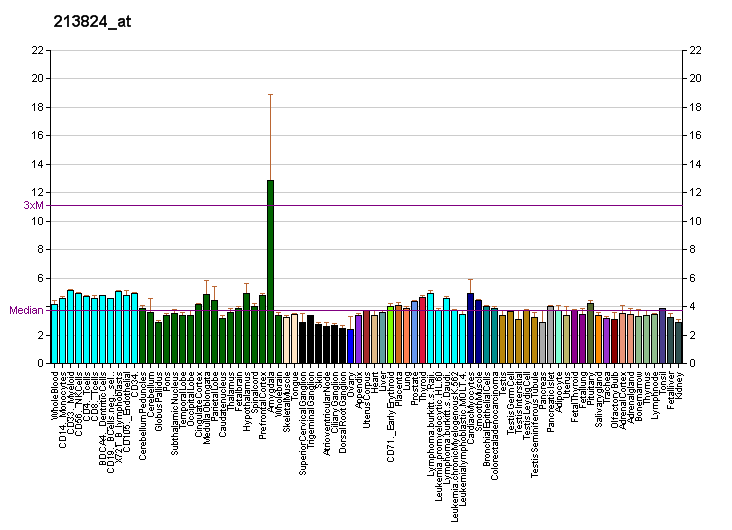

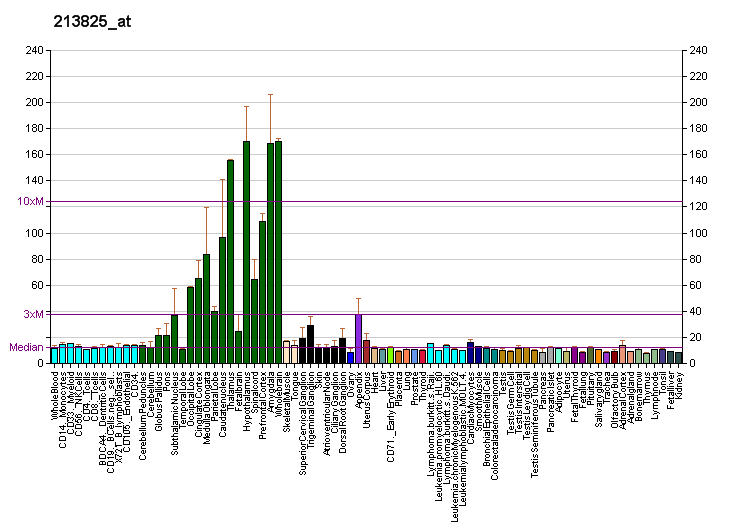
RNA expression pattern
Bgee	Human / Mouse (ortholog); Top expressed in: inferior ganglion of vagus nerve; globus pallidus; internal globus pallidus; amygdala; ventral tegmental area; subthalamic nucleus; external globus pallidus; substantia nigra; C1 segment; hippocampus proper / Top expressed in: lumbar subsegment of spinal cord; medial ganglionic eminence; optic nerve; white matter of cerebellum; deep cerebellar nuclei; respiratory epithelium; olfactory epithelium; lateral geniculate nucleus; anterior horn of spinal cord; ventral tegmental area; More reference expression data
BioGPS	More reference expression data
Gene ontology
Molecular function	DNA binding; protein dimerization activity; protein homodimerization activity; DNA-binding transcription factor activity; HMG box domain binding; transcription factor activity, RNA polymerase II distal enhancer sequence-specific binding; DNA-binding transcription factor activity, RNA polymerase II-specific
Cellular component	cytoplasm; nucleus
Biological process	positive regulation of oligodendrocyte differentiation; regulation of transcription, DNA-templated; negative regulation of neuron differentiation; thalamus development; spinal cord oligodendrocyte cell fate specification; oligodendrocyte differentiation; negative regulation of transcription by RNA polymerase II; transcription, DNA-templated; nervous system development; multicellular organism development; oligodendrocyte cell fate specification; neuron differentiation; myelination; neuron fate commitment; spinal cord motor neuron differentiation; spinal cord oligodendrocyte cell differentiation
Sources:Amigo / QuickGO
Orthologs
Databases	NCBI: entry; OMA: entry
Species	Human	Mouse
Entrez	10215	50913
Ensembl	ENSG00000205927	ENSMUSG00000039830
UniProt	Q13516	Q9EQW6
RefSeq (mRNA)	NM_005806	NM_016967
RefSeq (protein)	NP_005797	NP_058663
Location (UCSC)	Chr 21: 33.03 – 33.03 Mb	Chr 16: 91.02 – 91.03 Mb
PubMed search
- Wikidata
View/Edit Human	View/Edit Mouse

Oligodendrocyte transcription factor (OLIG2) is a basic helix-loop-helix (bHLH) transcription factor encoded by the OLIG2 gene. The protein is of 329 amino acids in length, 32 kDa in size and contains one basic helix-loop-helix DNA-binding domain. It is one of the three members of the bHLH family. The other two members are OLIG1 and OLIG3. The expression of OLIG2 is mostly restricted in central nervous system, where it acts as both an anti-neurigenic and a neurigenic factor at different stages of development. OLIG2 is well known for determining motor neuron and oligodendrocyte differentiation, as well as its role in sustaining replication in early development. It is mainly involved in diseases such as brain tumor and Down syndrome.

== Function ==
OLIG2 is mostly expressed in restricted domains of the brain and spinal cord ventricular zone which give rise to oligodendrocytes and specific types of neurons. In the spinal cord, the pMN region sequentially generates motor neurons and oligodendrocytes. During embryogenesis, OLIG2 first directs motor neuron fate by establishing a ventral domain of motor neuron progenitors and promoting neuronal differentiation. OLIG2 then switches to promoting the formation of oligodendrocyte precursors and oligodendrocyte differentiation at later stages of development. Apart from functioning as a neurogenic factor in specification and the differentiation of motor neurons and oligodendrocytes, OLIG2 also functions as an anti-neurogenic factor at early time points in pMN progenitors to sustain the cycling progenitor pool. This side of anti-neurogenicity of OLIG2 later plays a bigger role in malignancies like glioma.

The role of phosphorylation has been highlighted recently to account for the multifaceted functions of OLIG2 in differentiation and proliferation. Studies showed that the phosphorylation state of OLIG2 at Ser30 determines the fate of cortical progenitor cells, in which cortical progenitor cells will either differentiate into astrocytes or remain as neuronal progenitors. Phosphorylation at a triple serine motif (Ser10, Ser13 and Ser14) on the other hand was shown to regulate the proliferative function of OLIG2. Another phosphorylation site Ser147 predicted by bioinformatics was found to regulate motor neuron development by regulating the binding between OLIG2 and NGN2. Further, OLIG2 contains a ST box composed of a string of 12 contiguous serine and threonine residues at position Ser77-Ser88. It is believed that phosphorylation at ST box is biologically functional, yet the role of it still remains to be elucidated in vivo.

OLIG2 has also been implicated in bovine horn ontogenesis. It was the only gene in the bovine polled locus to show differential expression between the putative horn bud and the frontal forehead skin.

== Clinical Significance ==
=== OLIG2 in Cancer ===
OLIG2 is well recognized for its importance in cancer research, particularly in brain tumors and leukemia. OLIG2 is universally expressed in glioblastoma and other diffuse gliomas (astrocytomas, oligodendrogliomas and oligoastrocytomas), and is a useful positive diagnostic marker of these brain tumors. Although in normal brain tissue OLIG2 expresses mostly on oligodendrocytes but not on mature astrocytes, in adult glioma, OLIG2 expresses on both IDH1 or IDH2-mutant adult lower grade astrocytoma and oligodendroglioma on similar levels, but it is expressed on a lower level on IDH-wildtype glioblastoma. OLIG2 overexpression is a good surrogate marker for IDH mutation with an AUC of 0.90, but predicts poorly (AUC = 0.55) for 1p/19q co-deletion, a class-defining chromosomal alteration for oligodendroglioma. In survival analysis, higher mRNA levels of OLIG2 were associated with better overall survival, but this association was completely dependent on IDH mutation status.

In particular, OLIG2 is selectively expressed in a subgroup of glioma cells that are highly tumorigenic, and is shown to be required for proliferation of human glioma cells implanted in the brain of severe combined immunodeficiency (SCID) mice.

Though the molecular mechanism behind this tumorigenesis is not entirely clear, more studies have recently been published pinpointing diverse evidence and potential roles for OLIG2 in glioma progression. It is believed that OLIG2 promotes neural stem cell and progenitor cell proliferation by opposing p53 pathway, which potentially contributes to glioma progression. OLIG2 has been shown to directly repress the p53 tumor-suppressor pathway effector p21^{WAF1/CIP1}, suppress p53 acetylation and impede the binding of p53 to several enhancer sites. It is further found that the phosphorylation of triple-serine motif in OLIG2 is present in several glioma lines and is more tumorigenic than the unphosphorylated status. In a study using the U12-1 cell line for controlled expression of OLIG2, researchers showed that OLIG2 can suppress the proliferation of U12-1 by transactivating the p27^{Kip1} gene and can inhibit the motility of the cell by activating RhoA.

Besides glioma, OLIG2 is also involved in leukemogenesis. The Olig2 gene was actually first identified in a study in T-cell acute lymphoblastic leukemia, in which the expression of OLIG2 was found elevated after t(14;21)(q11.2;q22) chromosomal translocation. The overexpression of OLIG2 was later shown present in malignancies beyond glioma and leukemia, such as breast cancer, melanoma and non-small cell lung carcinoma cell lines. It also has been shown that up-regulation of OLIG2 together with LMO1 and Notch1 helps to provide proliferation signals.

=== OLIG2 in Neural Diseases ===
OLIG2 is also associated with Down syndrome, as it locates at chromosome 21 within or near the Down syndrome critical region on the long arm. This region is believed to contribute to the cognitive defects of Down syndrome. The substantial increase in the number of forebrain inhibitory neurons often observed in Ts65dn mouse (a murine model of trisomy 21) could lead to imbalance between excitation and inhibition and behavioral abnormalities. However, genetic reduction of OLIG2 and OLIG1 from three copies to two rescued the overproduction of interneurons, indicating the pivotal role of OLIG2 expression level in Down syndrome. The association between OLIG2 and neural diseases (i.e. schizophrenia and Alzheimer's disease) are under scrutiny, as several single nucleotide polymorphisms (SNPs) associated with these diseases in OLIG2 were identified by genome-wide association work.

OLIG2 also plays a functional role in neural repair. Studies showed that the number of OLIG2-expressing cells increased in the lesion after cortical stab-wound injury, supporting the role for OLIG2 in reactive gliosis. OLIG2 was also implicated in generating reactive astrocytes possibly in a transient re-expression manner, but the mechanisms are unclear.
