= Myelination =

Formation of myelin sheaths in the nervous system

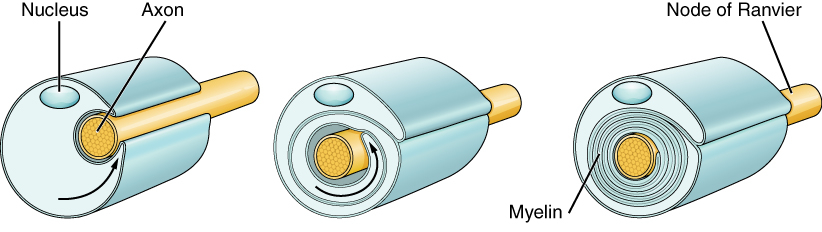
Myelination of a peripheral nerve by a Schwann cell

Myelination, or myelinogenesis, is the formation and development of myelin sheaths in the nervous system, typically initiated in late prenatal neurodevelopment and continuing throughout postnatal development. The term myelinogenesis is also sometimes used to differentiate the very early stages of embryonic myelination.

Myelin is formed by oligodendrocytes in the central nervous system and Schwann cells in the peripheral nervous system. Myelination continues throughout the lifespan to support learning and memory via neural circuit plasticity as well as remyelination following injury. Successful myelination of axons increases action potential speed by enabling saltatory conduction, which is essential for timely signal conduction between spatially separate brain regions, as well as provides metabolic support to neurons.

== Stages ==
Myelin is formed by oligodendrocytes in the central nervous system and Schwann cells in the peripheral nervous system. Therefore, the first stage of myelinogenesis is often defined as the differentiation of oligodendrocyte progenitor cells (OPCs) or Schwann cell progenitors into their mature counterparts, followed by myelin formation around axons.

The oligodendrocyte lineage can be further classified into four stages based on their relation to the onset of myelination:

1. Differentiation: OPCs exit their proliferative, self-renewing state and begin to express genes and proteins associated with oligodendrocyte fate commitment.
2. Preoligodendrocyte: These cells express the O4 antigen and develop multiple processes which extend radially with no particular organization.
3. Immature oligodendrocyte: Sometimes referred to as premyelinating oligodendrocytes, these cells extend "pioneer processes" which contact axons and anchor premyelinating oligodendrocytes to neurons such that they are poised to commence myelinogenesis in response to axonal signals. These pioneer processes grow longitudinally along their target axons.
4. Mature oligodendrocyte: After myelinogenesis, mature oligodendrocytes surround axons in organized, multilamellar myelin sheaths that contain myelin basic protein (MBP) and myelin proteolipid protein (PLP).

Myelinogenesis thus encompasses the process of transition between phases 3 and 4. Upon initiation of myelinogenesis, each pioneer process forms lamellar extensions which extend and elaborate circumferentially around the target axon. This forms the first turn of the myelin sheath. The sheath continues to expand along the length of the target axon while new membrane is synthesized at the leading edge of the inner tongue of the developing myelin sheath, which begins to take on a spiral cross-sectional structure.

Myelination in the central nervous system by an oligodendrocyte

To drive proper assembly of membrane layers, PLP is inserted into the membrane to stabilize interactions between external leaflets of the myelin membranes; MBP is locally translated and inserted into the cytoplasmic membrane leaflets to strengthen myelin membranes internally. In concert with the formation of axonal nodes of Ranvier, the myelin sheath's edges form paranodal loops.

== Mechanism ==
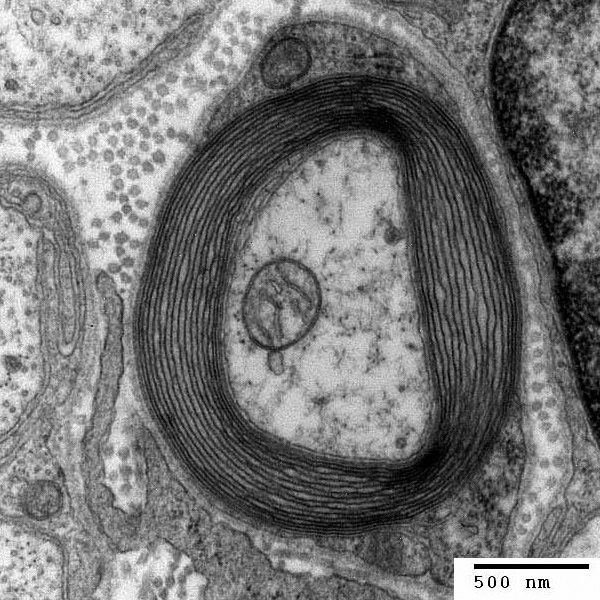
Transmission electron micrograph of a myelinated axon

Neuron with oligodendrocyte and myelin sheath showing cytoskeletal structures at a node of Ranvier

The basic helix–loop–helix transcription factor OLIG1 plays an integral role in the process of oligodendrocyte myelinogenesis by regulating expression of myelin-related genes. OLIG1 is necessary in order to initiate myelination by oligodendrocytes in the brain, but is somewhat dispensable in the spinal cord.

Axon-derived signals regulate the onset of myelinogenesis. Researchers studied regenerating PNS axons for 28 weeks in order to investigate whether or not peripheral axons stimulate oligodendrocytes to begin myelination. Experimental induction of myelination by regenerating peripheral axons demonstrated that Schwann cells and oligodendrocytes have a shared mechanism to stimulate myelination. A similar study working to provide evidence for neuronal regulation of myelinogenesis suggested that myelin formation was due to Schwann cells that were controlled by an undefined property of an associated axon.

Recent research in rats has suggested that apotransferrin and thyroid hormone act both separately and synergistically to promote myelinogenesis, as apotransferrin promotes expression of thyroid hormone receptor alpha.

Physical properties of axons, including their diameter, stiffness, and mechanical environment, have been shown to influence myelination, highlighting the role of biophysical as well as biochemical cues in regulating myelin formation.

=== Peripheral myelinogenesis ===
1. Axon 2. Nucleus of Schwann cell 3. Schwann cell 4. Myelin sheath 5. Neurilemma

Peripheral myelinogenesis is controlled by the synthesis of proteins P1, P2, and P0. By using SDS-PAGE, researchers revealed distinct bands with band sizes of 27,000 daltons (P1), 19,000 daltons (P2), and 14,000 daltons (P0). Studies have also shown that P1 and P2 are active before P0 since this protein comes from the peripheral nervous system. In the process of regeneration, Schwann cells re-synthesize proteins associated with myelin-specific proteins when axonal presence is re-established. Synthesis of myelin-specific proteins only occurs in Schwann cells associated with axons. Furthermore, membrane-membrane interactions between axons may be required to promote the synthesis of P1, P2, and P0.

=== Myelinogenesis in the optic nerve ===
The process and mechanistic function of myelinogenesis has traditionally been studied using ultrastructure and biochemical techniques in rat optic nerves. The implementation of this method of study has long allowed for experimental observation of myelinogenesis in a model organism nerve that consists entirely of unmyelinated axons. Furthermore, the use of the rat optic nerve helped provide insight for early myelinogenesis researchers into improper and atypical courses of myelinogenesis.

One early study showed that in the developing rat optic nerves, formation of oligodendrocytes and subsequent myelination occurs postnatal. In the optic nerve, the oligodendrocyte cells divided for the final time at five days, with the onset of myelin formation occurring on or around day 6 or 7. However, the exact process by which the oligodendrocytes were stimulated to produce myelin was not yet fully understood, but early myelination in the optic nerve has been linked to a rise in the production of various lipids – cholesterol, cerebroside, and sulfatide.

As researchers began to do postnatal research, they found that myelinogenesis in the rat optic nerve initially commences with axons the largest diameters before proceeding to the remaining smaller axons. In the second week postnatal, oligodendrocyte formation slowed – at this point, 15% of axons have been myelinated – however, myelinogenesis continued to rapidly increase. During the fourth week postnatal, nearly 85% of the axons in the rat optic had been myelinated. During the fifth week and onward toward week sixteen, the myelination decelerated and the remaining unmyelinated axons were ensheathed in myelin. Through the rat optic nerve, early research made significant contributions to knowledge in the field of myelinogenesis.

=== Role of sulfatides ===
Studies on the developing optic nerve revealed that galactocerebroside (which forms sulfatide) appeared on the 9th post-natal day and reached a peak on the 15th post-natal day. This expression was similar to a period where the optic nerve showed a maximal myelination period of the axon. As the activity of axon myelination decreased, and one could conclude that the activity of the enzyme is paralleled with the incorporation of sulfate ([35S]) into sulfatide in vivo.

The studies on a rat optic nerve revealed that 15 days post-natal is when an increase in myelination is observed. Before this time period, most of the axons, roughly about 70%, are not myelinated. At this time, [35S] Sulfate was incorporated into sulfatide and the activity of cerebroside sulfotransferase reached a peak in enzyme activity. This time frame also showed a period of maximal myelination based on the biochemical data.

In the CNS, sulfatide, sulfated glycoproteins, and sulfated mucopolysaccharides appear to be associated with neurons rather than myelin. When graphing the amount of sulfatide made from [35S] and the activity of sulfotransferase, we get to distinguished peaks. The peaks occur on the 15th post-natal day. These peaks corresponded with the maximal myelination period of the optic nerve that has been seen throughout the experiment.

In conclusion, the early phase of myelination was correlated with the increases synthesis of lipids, cholesterol, cerebroside, and sulfatide. It is likely that these compounds are synthesized and packaged in the Golgi Apparatus of oligodendroglia. Even though the transport of these lipids is unknown, it appears that myelination is delayed without their synthesis.

== Clinical significance ==
Myelin provides axons with the ability for fast conduction of action potentials, and its damage can cause a number of demyelinating disorders that negatively affect the functioning of the nervous system. One such disease is multiple sclerosis, where demyelination occurs in the central nervous system. Strategies have targeted the protection of oligodendrocytes and the promotion of remyelination, and others have examined the role of the immune system in demyelination in multiple sclerosis.

In the aging brain the build up of amyloid fibrils in chronic amyloidosis, has a toxic effect on the myelin sheath, and axons, leading to mild cognitive disorder, and dementia.

== History ==
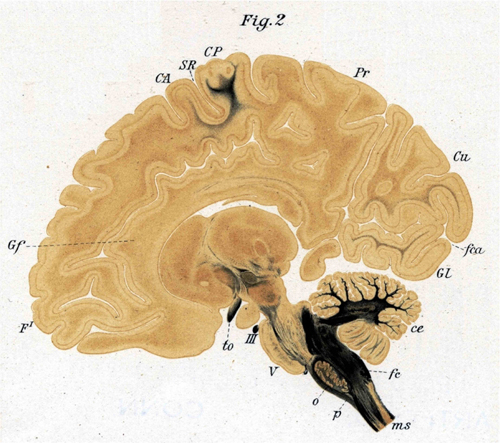
Primary somatosensory cortex (CP: posterior centrale) and primary motor cortex (CA: anterior centrale) of a 7-month-old human fetus. Nissl-stained parasagittal section (Flechsig 1921)

Paul Flechsig spent most of his career studying and publishing the details of the process in the cerebral cortex of humans. This takes place mostly between two months before and after birth. He identified 45 separate cortical areas and, in fact, mapped the cerebral cortex by the myelination pattern. The first cortical region to myelinate is in the motor cortex (part of Brodmann's area 4), the second is the olfactory cortex and the third is part of the somatosensory cortex (BA 3,1,2).

The last areas to myelinate are the anterior cingulate cortex (F#43), the inferior temporal cortex (F#44) and the dorsolateral prefrontal cortex (F#45).

In the cerebral convolutions, as in all other parts of the central nervous system, the nerve-fibres do not develop everywhere simultaneously, but step by step in a definite succession, this order of events being particularly maintained in regard to the appearance of the medullary substance. In the convolutions of the cerebrum the investment with medullary substance (myelinisation) has already begun in some places three months before the maturity of the foetus, whilst in other places numerous fibres are devoid of medullary substance even three months after birth. The order of succession in the convolutions is governed by a law identical with the law which I have shown holds good for the spinal cord, the medulla oblongata, and the mesocephalon, and which may be stated somewhat in this way- that, speaking approximately, equally important nerve-fibres are developed simultaneously, but those of dissimilar importance are developed one after another in a succession defined by an imperative law (Fundamental Law of Myelogenesis). The formation of medullary substance is almost completed in certain convolutions at a time when in some it is not even begun and in others has made only slight progress.
