= Angiostatin =

Angiostatin is a naturally occurring protein found in several animal species, including humans. It is an endogenous angiogenesis inhibitor (i.e., it blocks the growth of new blood vessels). Clinical trials have been undertaken for its use in anticancer therapy.

== Structure ==
Angiostatin is a 38 kDa fragment of a larger protein, plasmin (itself a fragment of plasminogen) enclosing three to five contiguous kringle modules. Each module contains two small beta sheets and three disulfide bonds.

There are four different structural variants to angiostatin differing in the combination of kringle domains: K1-3, K1-4, K1-5, K1-4 with a fragment of K-5. Each kringle domain contributes a different element of inhibition to the cytokine. Recent studies through recombinant angiostatin have shown however that K1-3 is pivotal is the inhibitory nature of angiostatin.

K1-3 form the “triangular bowl-like structure” of angiostatin. This structure is stabilized by interactions between inter-kringle peptides and kringles, although the kringle domains do not directly interact with each other. Angiostatin is effectively divided into two sides. The active site of K1 is found on one side, while the active sites of K2 and K3 are found on the other. This is hypothesized to result in the two different functions of angiostatin. The K1 side is believed to be primarily responsible for the inhibition of cellular proliferation, while the K2-K3 sides is believed to be primarily responsible for the inhibition of cell migration.

== Generation ==
Angiostatin is produced, for example, by autoproteolytic cleavage of plasminogen, involving extracellular disulfide bond reduction by phosphoglycerate kinase. Furthermore, angiostatin can be cleaved from plasminogen by different metalloproteinases (MMPs), elastase, prostate-specific antigen (PSA), 13 KD serine protease, or 24KD endopeptidase.

== Biological activity ==
Angiostatin is known to bind many proteins, especially to angiomotin and endothelial cell surface ATP synthase but also integrins, annexin II, C-met receptor, NG2 proteoglycan, tissue-type plasminogen activator, chondroitin sulfate proteoglycans, and CD26. Additionally, smaller fragments of angiostatin may bind several other proteins. There is still considerable uncertainty on its mechanism of action, but it seems to involve inhibition of endothelial cell migration, proliferation and induction of apoptosis. It has been proposed that angiostatin activity is related, among other things, to the coupling of its mechanical and redox properties.

Although the exact mechanisms of action of angiostatin has not been completely understood yet, there are three proposed mechanism of action. The first proposed mechanism of action is that angiostatin binds to F1-FoATP synthase found both in the mitochondria and on the cellular membrane of epithelial cells which not only inhibits ATP production in tumor cells but also inhibits the cell's ability to maintain the acidic pH of tumor cells. This inability to regulate the intracellular pH can initiate apoptosis. Another proposed mechanism of action is that angiostatin is able to reduce epithelial cell migration by binding to avB3-integrins. However studies have shown that avB3-integrins are not critically essential for angiogenesis, so more investigation is require to ascertain how the inhibition of avB3-integrins inhibit epithelial cell migration. Another proposed mechanism of action is that angiostatin binds to Angiomotin (AMOT) and activating focal adhesion kinase (FAK). FAK has been shown to promote the inhibition of cell proliferation and cell migration, but lack of knowledge on how angiostatin and angiomotin function necessitate that addition research is required.
