= OLIG1 =

Protein-coding gene in the species Homo sapiens

Identifiers
- Aliases: OLIG1, BHLHB6, BHLHE21, oligodendrocyte transcription factor 1
- External IDs: OMIM: 606385; MGI: 1355334; GeneCards: OLIG1

Gene location (Human)
Chr.	Chromosome 21 (human)
Band	21q22.11	Start	33,070,141 bp
Band	21q22.11	End	33,072,413 bp

Gene location (Mouse)
Chr.	Chromosome 16 (mouse)
Band	16|16 C3.3	Start	91,066,660 bp
Band	16|16 C3.3	End	91,068,821 bp
RNA expression pattern
Bgee	Human / Mouse (ortholog); Top expressed in: inferior ganglion of vagus nerve; C1 segment; external globus pallidus; subthalamic nucleus; ventral tegmental area; substantia nigra; medulla oblongata; amygdala; superior vestibular nucleus; putamen / Top expressed in: optic nerve; deep cerebellar nuclei; substantia nigra; nucleus of stria terminalis; spinal cord; lumbar subsegment of spinal cord; globus pallidus; central gray substance of midbrain; anterior horn of spinal cord; ventral tegmental area; More reference expression data
BioGPS	n/a
Gene ontology
Molecular function	DNA binding; protein binding; protein dimerization activity; DNA-binding transcription factor activity, RNA polymerase II-specific
Cellular component	nucleus
Biological process	multicellular organism development; neuron fate commitment; oligodendrocyte differentiation; regulation of transcription, DNA-templated; transcription, DNA-templated; regulation of transcription by RNA polymerase II
Sources:Amigo / QuickGO
Orthologs
Databases	NCBI: entry; OMA: entry
Species	Human	Mouse
Entrez	116448	50914
Ensembl	ENSG00000184221	ENSMUSG00000046160
UniProt	Q8TAK6	Q9JKN5
RefSeq (mRNA)	NM_138983	NM_016968
RefSeq (protein)	NP_620450	NP_058664
Location (UCSC)	Chr 21: 33.07 – 33.07 Mb	Chr 16: 91.07 – 91.07 Mb
PubMed search
- Wikidata
View/Edit Human	View/Edit Mouse

Oligodendrocyte transcription factor 1 (Oligo 1) is a protein that in humans is encoded by the OLIG1 gene.

== See also ==
- Oligodendrocyte
- Transcription factor
- OLIG2
