= CSPG4 =

Protein-coding gene in humans

Identifiers
- Aliases: CSPG4, HMW-MAA, MCSP, MCSPG, MEL-CSPG, MSK16, NG2, chondroitin sulfate proteoglycan 4, CSPG4A
- External IDs: OMIM: 601172; MGI: 2153093; GeneCards: CSPG4

Gene location (Human)
Chr.	Chromosome 15 (human)
Band	15q24.2	Start	75,674,322 bp
Band	15q24.2	End	75,712,848 bp

Gene location (Mouse)
Chr.	Chromosome 9 (mouse)
Band	9|9 B	Start	56,772,317 bp
Band	9|9 B	End	56,807,154 bp
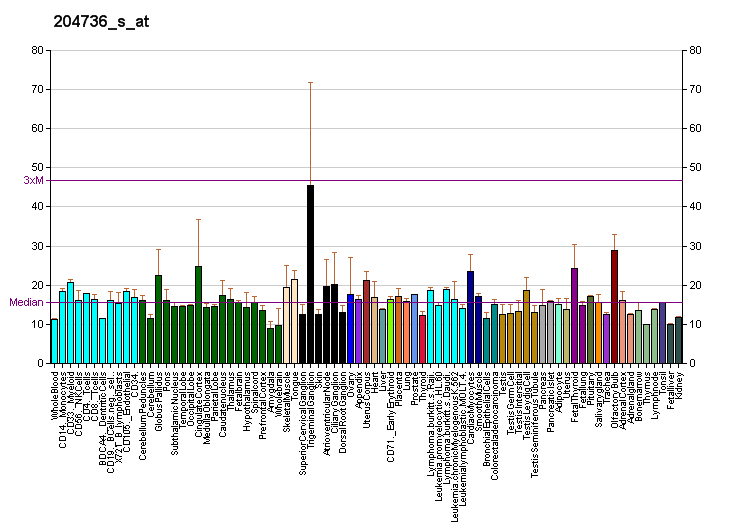

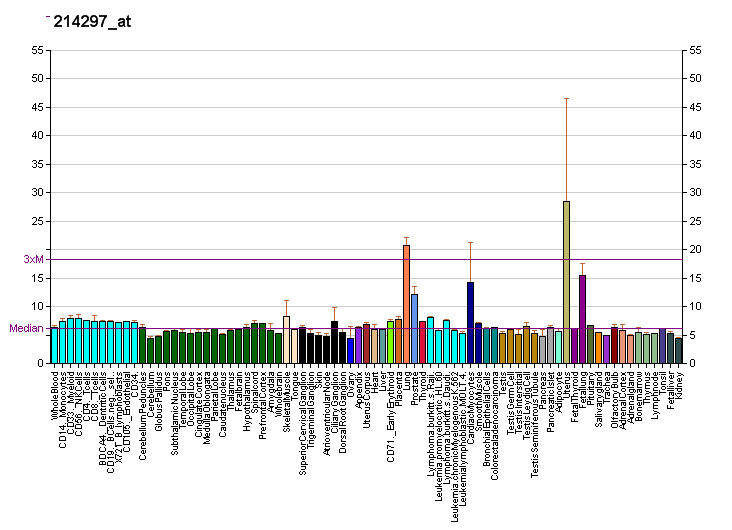
RNA expression pattern
Bgee	Human / Mouse (ortholog); Top expressed in: tendon of biceps brachii; cartilage tissue; tibia; popliteal artery; tibial arteries; right coronary artery; Descending thoracic aorta; ascending aorta; left coronary artery; muscle layer of sigmoid colon / Top expressed in: ascending aorta; tunica media of zone of aorta; internal carotid artery; aortic valve; fossa; condyle; external carotid artery; phalanx of foot; phalanx of third toe; phalanx of fourth toe; More reference expression data
BioGPS	More reference expression data
Gene ontology
Molecular function	signal transducer activity; protein kinase binding
Cellular component	integral component of membrane; cell projection; membrane; focal adhesion; plasma membrane; integral component of plasma membrane; extracellular region; cell surface; lysosomal lumen; apical plasma membrane; Golgi lumen; extracellular exosome; lamellipodium membrane; extracellular matrix; collagen-containing extracellular matrix
Biological process	glycosaminoglycan metabolic process; cell differentiation; intracellular signal transduction; transmembrane receptor protein tyrosine kinase signaling pathway; chondroitin sulfate biosynthetic process; multicellular organism development; angiogenesis; positive regulation of peptidyl-tyrosine phosphorylation; chondroitin sulfate catabolic process; dermatan sulfate biosynthetic process; cell population proliferation; tissue remodeling; signal transduction; glial cell migration
Sources:Amigo / QuickGO
Orthologs
Databases	NCBI: entry; OMA: entry
Species	Human	Mouse
Entrez	1464	121021
Ensembl	ENSG00000173546	ENSMUSG00000032911
UniProt	Q6UVK1	Q8VHY0
RefSeq (mRNA)	NM_001897	NM_139001
RefSeq (protein)	NP_001888	NP_620570
Location (UCSC)	Chr 15: 75.67 – 75.71 Mb	Chr 9: 56.77 – 56.81 Mb
PubMed search
- Wikidata
View/Edit Human	View/Edit Mouse

Chondroitin sulfate proteoglycan 4, also known as melanoma-associated chondroitin sulfate proteoglycan (MCSP) or neuron-glial antigen 2 (NG2), is a chondroitin sulfate proteoglycan that in humans is encoded by the CSPG4 gene.

== Function ==
CSPG4 plays a role in stabilizing cell-substratum interactions during early events of melanoma cell spreading on endothelial basement membranes. It represents an integral membrane chondroitin sulfate proteoglycan expressed by human melanoma cells.

== Implications in disease ==
CSPG4/NG2 is also a hallmark protein of oligodendrocyte progenitor cells (OPCs) and OPC dysfunction has been implicated as a candidate pathophysiological mechanism of familial schizophrenia. A research group investigating the role of genetics in schizophrenia, reported, two rare missense mutations in CSPG4 gene, segregating within families (CSPG4^{A131T} and CSPG4^{V901G} mutations). The researchers also demonstrate that the induced pluripotent stem cells (iPSCs)-derived OPCs from CSPG4^{A131T} mutation carriers exhibited abnormal post-translational processing, subcellular localization of the mutant NG2 protein, aberrant cellular morphology, and a decreased cell viability and myelination potential. In vivo diffusion tensor imaging of the brain of CSPG4^{A131T} mutation carriers demonstrated a reduced white matter integrity compared to the unaffected sibling and matched general population controls.

== See also ==
- NG2-glia
