= Oligodendrocyte =

Neural cell type

- Oligodendrocytes form the myelin insulation around the axons of neurons in the central nervous system

Details
- Location: Central nervous system

Identifiers
- Latin: oligodendrocytus
- MeSH: D009836
- TH: H2.00.06.2.00003, H2.00.06.2.01018
- FMA: 83665 54540, 83665

Oligodendrocytes (from Greek 'cells with a few branches'), also known as oligodendroglia, are a type of neuroglia whose main function is to provide the myelin sheath to neuronal axons in the central nervous system (CNS). Myelination gives metabolic support to, and insulates the axons of most vertebrates. A single oligodendrocyte can extend its processes to cover up to 40 axons, that can include multiple adjacent axons. The myelin sheath is segmented along the axon's length at gaps known as the nodes of Ranvier. In the peripheral nervous system the myelination of axons is carried out by Schwann cells.

Oligodendrocytes are found exclusively in the CNS, which comprises the brain and spinal cord. They are the most widespread cell lineage, including oligodendrocyte progenitor cells, pre-myelinating cells, and mature myelinating oligodendrocytes in the CNS white matter. Non-myelinating oligodendrocytes are found in the grey matter surrounding and lying next to neuronal cell bodies. They are known as neuronal satellite cells, and their presence is not understood.

It was once thought that oligodendrocytes were produced in the ventral neural tube, the embryonic precursor to the CNS. Studies have suggested that they originate from the ventral ventricular zone of the embryonic spinal cord, with some potential concentrations in the forebrain. Oligodendrocytes are the last type of cell to be generated in the CNS. Oligodendrocytes were discovered by Pío del Río Hortega.

== Classification ==
Oligodendrocytes are a type of glial cell, non-neuronal cells in the central nervous system. They arise during development from oligodendrocyte precursor cells (OPCs), which can be identified by their expression of a number of antigens, including the ganglioside GD3, the NG2 chondroitin sulfate proteoglycan, and the platelet-derived growth factor-alpha receptor subunit (PDGF-alphaR). Mature oligodendrocytes are broadly classified into either myelinating or non-myelinating neuronal satellite cells. Precursors and both mature types are typically identified by their expression of the transcription factor OLIG2.

== Development ==
Most oligodendrocytes develop during embryogenesis and early postnatal life from restricted periventricular germinal regions. Oligodendrocyte formation in the adult brain is associated with glial-restricted progenitor cells, known as oligodendrocyte progenitor cells (OPCs). Subventricular zone OPCs are activated and then migrate away from germinal zones to populate both developing white and gray matter, where they differentiate and mature into myelin-forming oligodendrocytes. However, it is not clear whether all oligodendrocyte progenitors undergo this sequence of events.

Between midgestation and term birth in human cerebral white matter, three successive stages of the classic human oligodendrocyte lineage are found: OPCs, immature oligodendrocytes (non-myelinating), and mature oligodendrocytes (myelinating). It has been suggested that some undergo apoptosis and others fail to differentiate into mature oligodendrocytes but persist as adult OPCs. Remarkably, the oligodendrocyte population originated in the subventricular zone can be dramatically expanded by administering epidermal growth factor (EGF).

== Function ==
=== Myelination ===
Myelination in the central nervous system by an oligodendrocyte

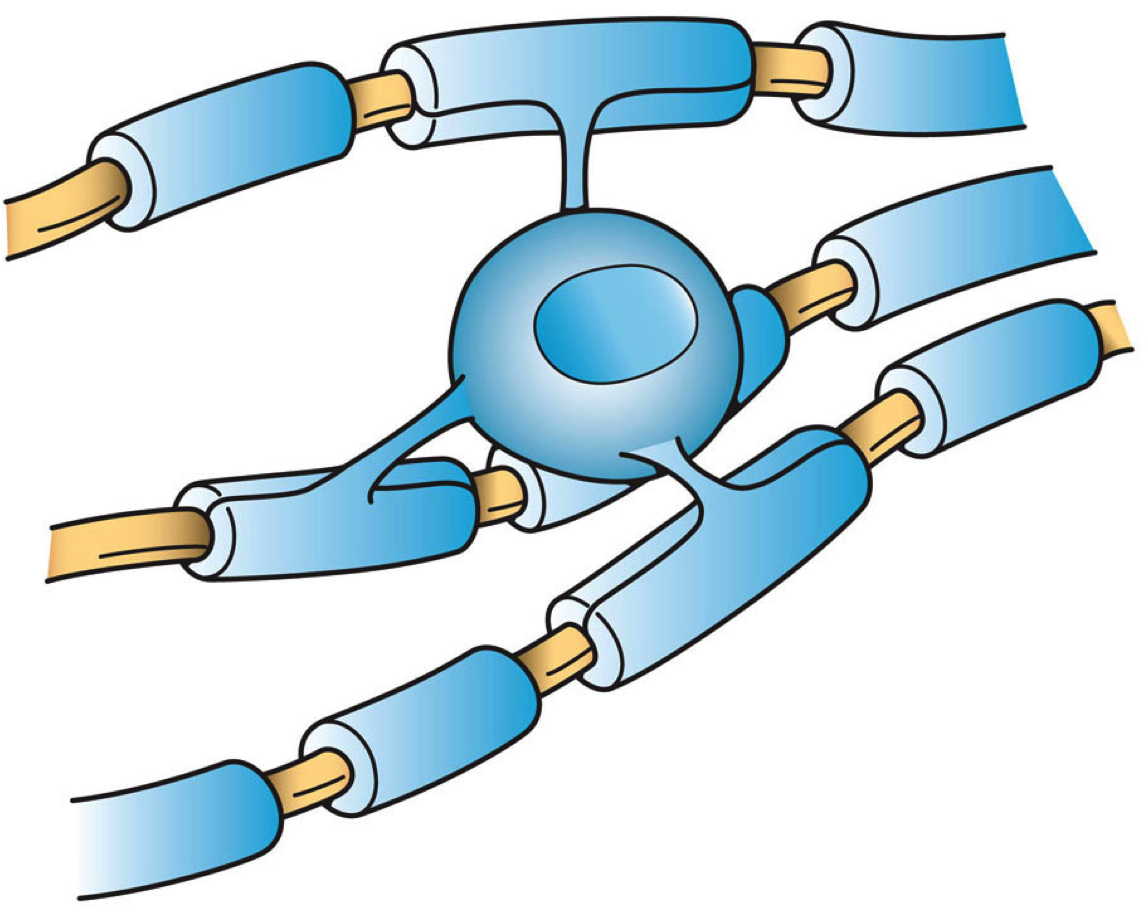
An oligodendrocyte seen myelinating several axons.

Mammalian nervous systems depend crucially on myelin sheaths, which reduce ion leakage and decrease the capacitance of the cell membrane, for rapid signal conduction. Myelin also increases impulse speed, as saltatory conduction of action potentials occurs at the nodes of Ranvier in oligodendrocytes. The impulse speed of a myelinated axon increases linearly with the axon diameter, whereas the impulse speed of unmyelinated cells increases only with the square root of the diameter. The insulation must be proportional to the diameter of the fibre inside. The optimal ratio of axon diameter divided by the total fiber diameter (which includes the myelin) is 0.6.

Experimental systems have been developed to investigate oligodendrocyte-mediated myelination in controlled environments, including engineered hydrogel-based platforms that recapitulate key physical features of axons and support myelin formation.

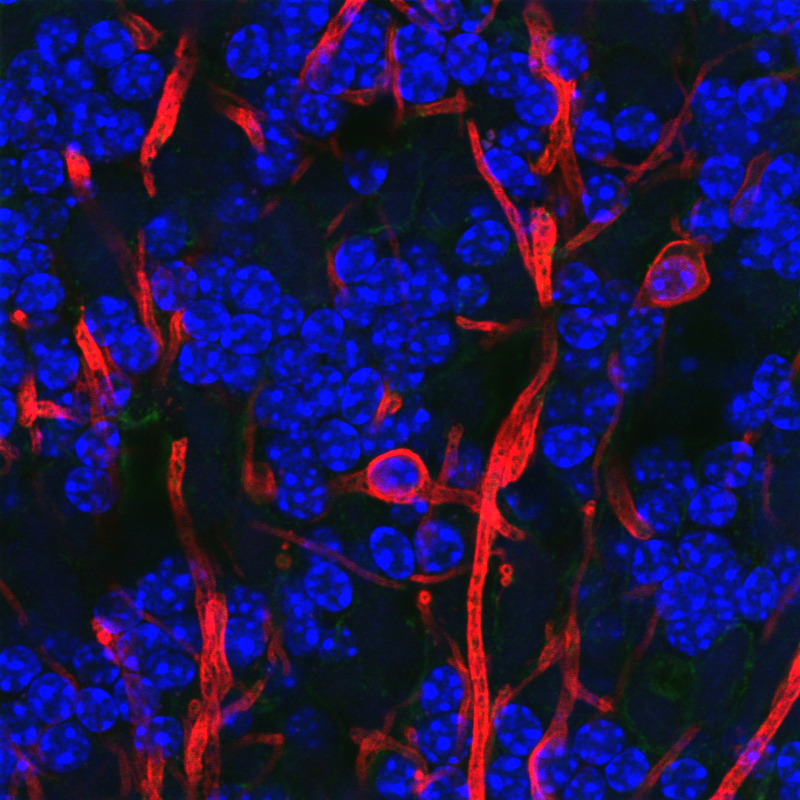
Oligodendrocytes in rat cerebellum stained with antibody to myelin basic protein in red and for DNA in blue. Two oligodendrocyte cell bodies are clearly visible as well as several myelinated axons. These are hollow tubes and so appear as "tramlines" in this confocal image. Most of the DNA is in the nuclei of cerebellum granule cells, which are small interneurons. Image and antibody stain from EnCor Biotechnology Inc.

Myelination is only prevalent in a few brain regions at birth and continues into adulthood. The entire process is not complete until about 25–30 years of age. Myelination is an important component of intelligence, and white matter quantity may be positively correlated with IQ test results in children. Rats that were raised in an enriched environment, which is known to increase cognitive flexibility, had more myelination in their corpus callosum.

=== Immune function ===
Oligodendrocytes, best known for their role in myelinating axons in the central nervous system, also have important functions in immune regulation. These cells can influence the immune environment by secreting cytokines and chemokines, which modulate the activity of various immune cells. Oligodendrocytes express receptors that allow them to respond to inflammatory signals, thereby participating in the brain's defense mechanisms. Additionally, they play a role in maintaining the blood-brain barrier and can contribute to the resolution of inflammation, highlighting their multifaceted role in both neural maintenance and immune responses. While most research has focused on the immune functions of OPCs, it is believed that oligodendrocytes themselves still possess significant immune functions.

=== Metabolic support ===
Oligodendrocytes interact closely with nerve cells and provide trophic support by the production of glial cell line-derived neurotrophic factor (GDNF), brain-derived neurotrophic factor (BDNF), or insulin-like growth factor-1 (IGF-1). They may also directly provide metabolites to neurons, as described by the lactate shuttle hypothesis.

It is hypothesized that satellite oligodendrocytes (or perineuronal oligodendrocytes) are functionally distinct from other oligodendrocytes. They are not attached to neurons via myelin sheaths and, therefore, do not contribute to insulation. They remain opposed to neurons and regulate the extracellular fluid. Satellite oligodendrocytes are considered to be a part of the grey matter whereas myelinating oligodendrocytes are a part of the white matter. They may support neuronal metabolism. Satellite oligodendrocytes may be recruited to produce new myelin after a demyelinating injury.

== Clinical significance ==
Diseases that result in injury to oligodendrocytes include demyelinating diseases such as multiple sclerosis and various leukodystrophies. Trauma to the body, e.g. spinal cord injury, can also cause demyelination. The immature oligodendrocytes, which increase in number during mid-gestation, are more vulnerable to hypoxic injury and are involved in periventricular leukomalacia. This largely congenital condition of damage to the newly forming brain can therefore lead to cerebral palsy. In cerebral palsy, spinal cord injury, stroke and possibly multiple sclerosis, oligodendrocytes are thought to be damaged by excessive release of the neurotransmitter, glutamate. Damage has also been shown to be mediated by N-methyl-D-aspartate receptors. Oligodendrocyte dysfunction may also be implicated in the pathophysiology of schizophrenia and bipolar disorder.

Oligodendrocytes are also susceptible to infection by the JC virus, which causes progressive multifocal leukoencephalopathy (PML), a condition that specifically affects white matter, typically in immunocompromised patients. The chemotherapy agent Fluorouracil (5-FU) causes damage to the oligodendrocytes in mice, leading to both acute central nervous system (CNS) damage and progressively worsening delayed degeneration of the CNS. DNA methylation may also have a role in the degeneration of oligodendrocytes.

Damage to myelin has been shown to exacerbate amyloid plaque accumulation, potentially placing age-related myelin decline as an upstream risk factor in Alzheimer's disease. Oligodendrocytes also abundantly express components of the amyloidogenic pathway, produce amyloid beta (Aβ), and contribute to plaque burden, which is relevant when considering therapeutic interventions for Alzheimer's disease.

The neuronal satellite cells in the grey matter of the lobes of the brain, can produce slow-growing tumours. The tumours known as oligodendrogliomas are of clusters of tumour cells beneath the pia mater.

== See also ==
- 2',3'-Cyclic-nucleotide 3'-phosphodiesterase (CNPase)
- List of distinct cell types in the adult human body
- List of human cell types derived from the germ layers
