= TSBP1 =

Protein found in humans

Identifiers
- Aliases: TSBP1, TSBP, chromosome 6 open reading frame 10, testis expressed basic protein 1, C6orf10
- External IDs: OMIM: 618151; GeneCards: TSBP1

Gene location (Human)
Chr.	Chromosome 6 (human)
Band	6p21.32	Start	32,288,526 bp
Band	6p21.32	End	32,371,912 bp
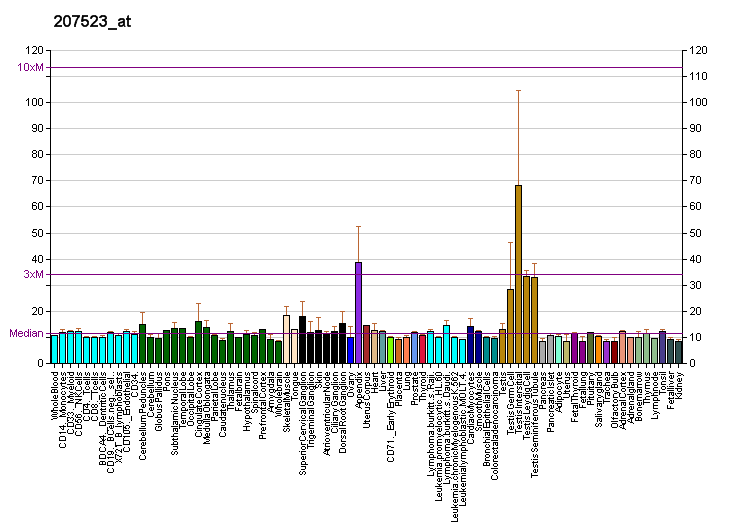
RNA expression pattern
Bgee	Human / Mouse (ortholog); Top expressed in: left testis; right testis; testicle; gonad; sural nerve; lymph node; Achilles tendon; tonsil; cervix; right ovary / n/a; More reference expression data
BioGPS	More reference expression data
Orthologs
Databases	NCBI: entry; OMA: entry
Species	Human	Mouse
Entrez	10665	n/a
Ensembl	ENSG00000206245; ENSG00000236672; ENSG00000204296; ENSG00000206310; ENSG00000234280 ENSG00000237881; ENSG00000232106; ENSG00000226892	n/a
UniProt	Q5SRN2	n/a
RefSeq (mRNA)	NM_001286474; NM_001286475; NM_006781	n/a
RefSeq (protein)	NP_001273403; NP_001273404; NP_006772	n/a
Location (UCSC)	Chr 6: 32.29 – 32.37 Mb	n/a
PubMed search		n/a
- Wikidata
View/Edit Human

TSBP1 is a protein that in humans is encoded by the TSBP1 gene. TSBP1 was previously known as C6orf10. C6orf10 is an open reading frame on chromosome 6 containing a protein that is ubiquitously expressed at low levels in the adult genome and may play a role during fetal development. C6orf10 has been found to be linked to both neurodegenerative and autoimmune diseases in adults. Expression of this gene is highest in the testis but is also seen in other tissue types such as the brain, lens of the eye and the medulla.

== mRNA Transcript ==
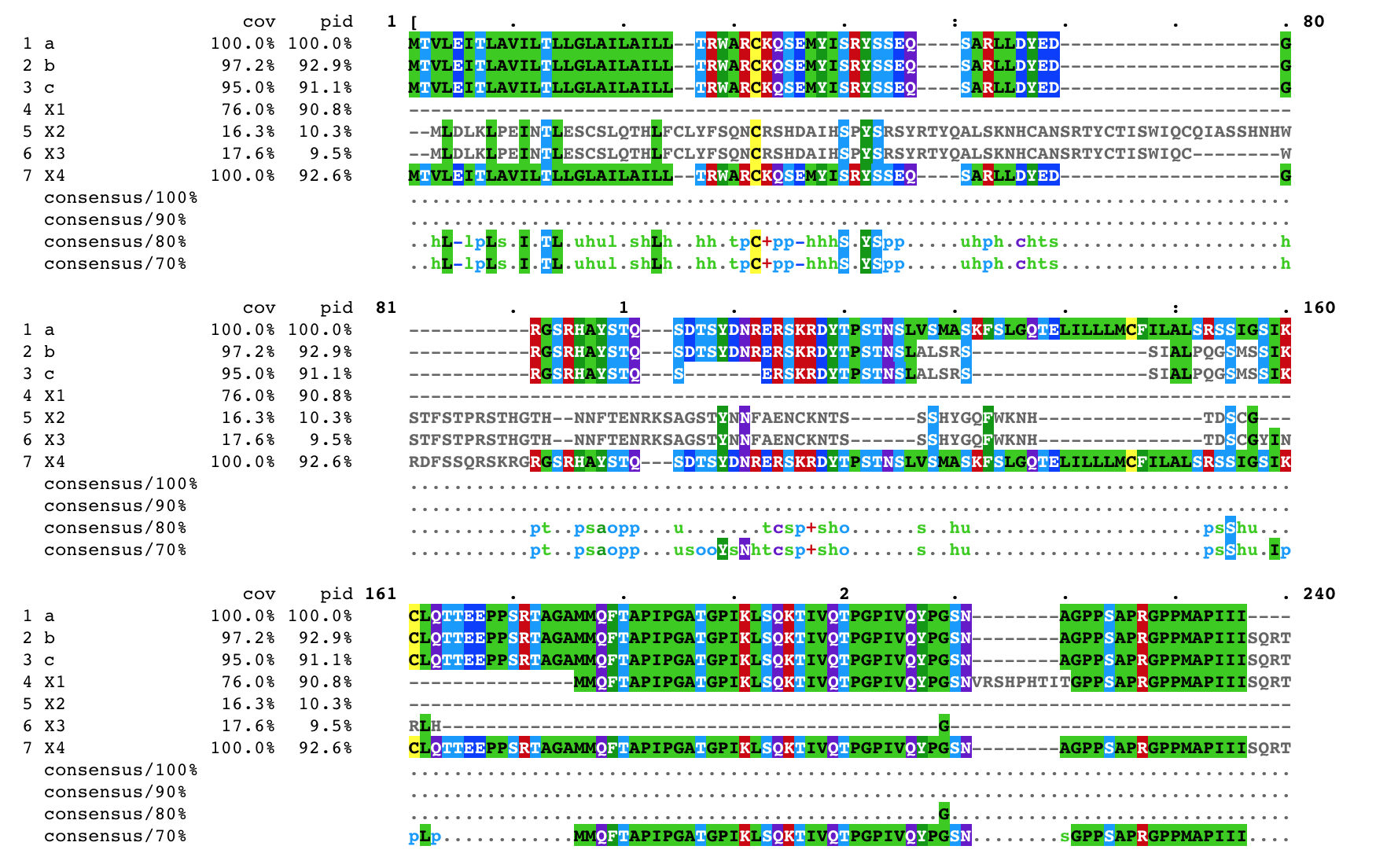
Multiple sequence alignment of all C6orf10 human isoforms. This image was generated using Clustal W and M view.

C6orf10 contains seven human mRNA splice variants (a, b, c, X1, X2, X3, X4).

=== Conserved non-coding region ===
TSBP1 contains a highly conserved stem loop structure in the 3' UTR from bases 100–124.

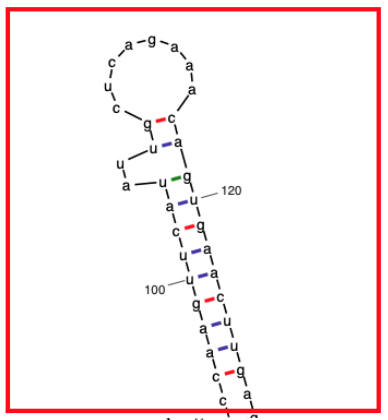
Highly conserved stem loop structure from C6orf10 isoform a

== Protein ==
=== Composition ===
C6orf10 isoform a is rich in lysine (K), Glutamine (Q) and Glutamic acid (E) and poor in Histidine (H) and Phenylalanine(F)^{]}. Isoform a is a basic protein with an isoelectric point of 9 and a molecular weight of 62,000 kDa.

This isoform contains two transmembrane regions near the beginning of the amino acid sequence. The first transmembrane region spans from residue 6 to residue 25 (19 total residues) and has an isoelectric point of 5. The second transmembrane region spans from residue 100 to residue 119 (19 total residues) and has an isoelectric point of 8. Isoform a contains a PTZ00121 domain starting with residue 221 and going until the end of the protein. There are several repetitive sequences within this domain.

=== Secondary Structure ===
TSBP1 consists mostly of alpha helices and random coils. There are only a few regions that contain beta sheets.

=== Subcellular Localization ===
TSBP1 is predicted to be localized to the Nucleus and the Endoplasmic Reticulum. There is a signal peptide cleavage site between amino acid 30 and 31 which includes the first transmembrane domain. This N-terminal region of C6orf10 is likely localized to the endoplasmic reticulum. The C-terminal region of the protein contain two nuclear localization signals from amino acid 489-505 and 513-529 indicating that the section of the protein after the signal peptide cleavage site is localized to the nucleus.

== Expression ==
TSBP1 is ubiquitously expressed at low levels in the adult human genome. In adults, expression of this gene is highest in the testis. C6orf10 is expressed at higher levels in fetal and embryonic tissues. This indicates C6orf10 may play a role in development.

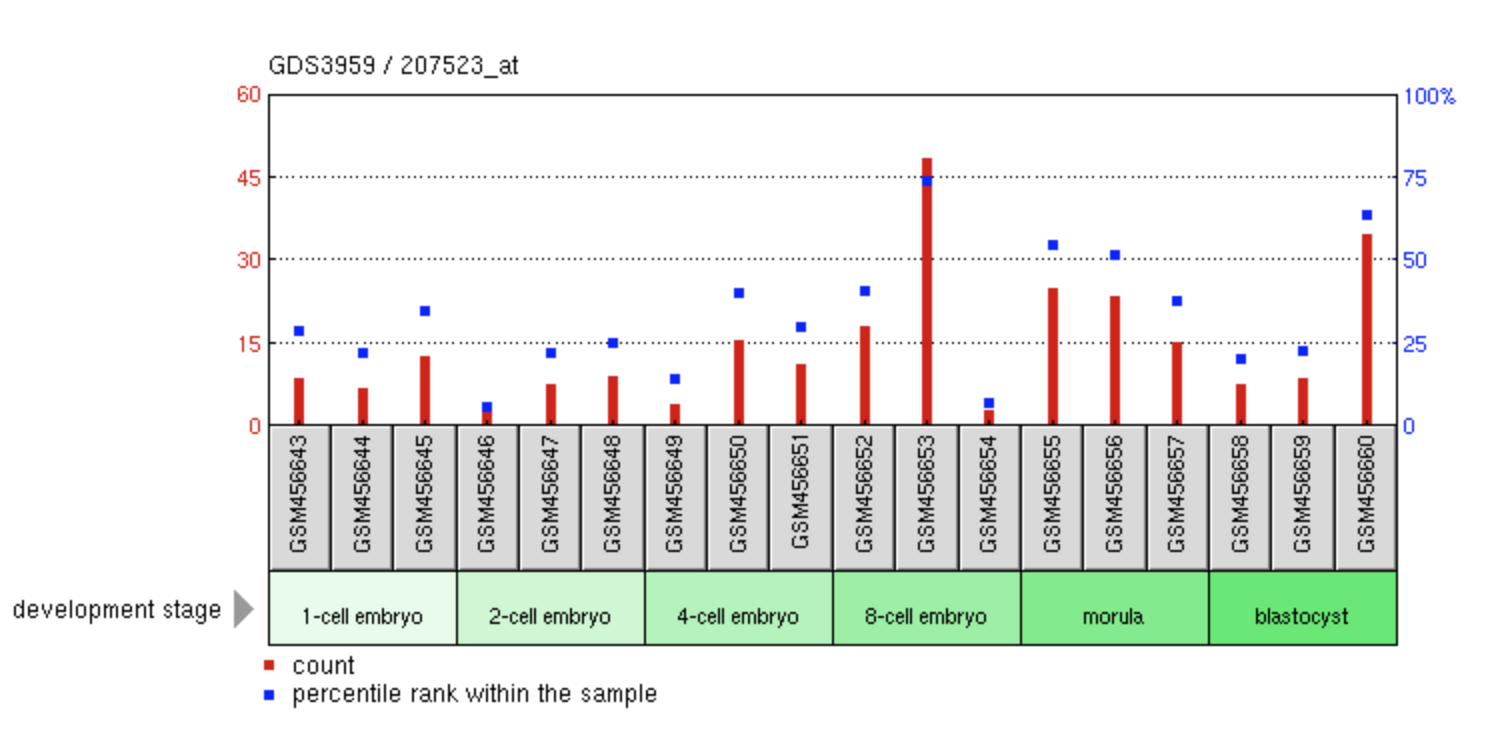
Tissue Expression profile of C6orf10 gene in preimplanted embryos

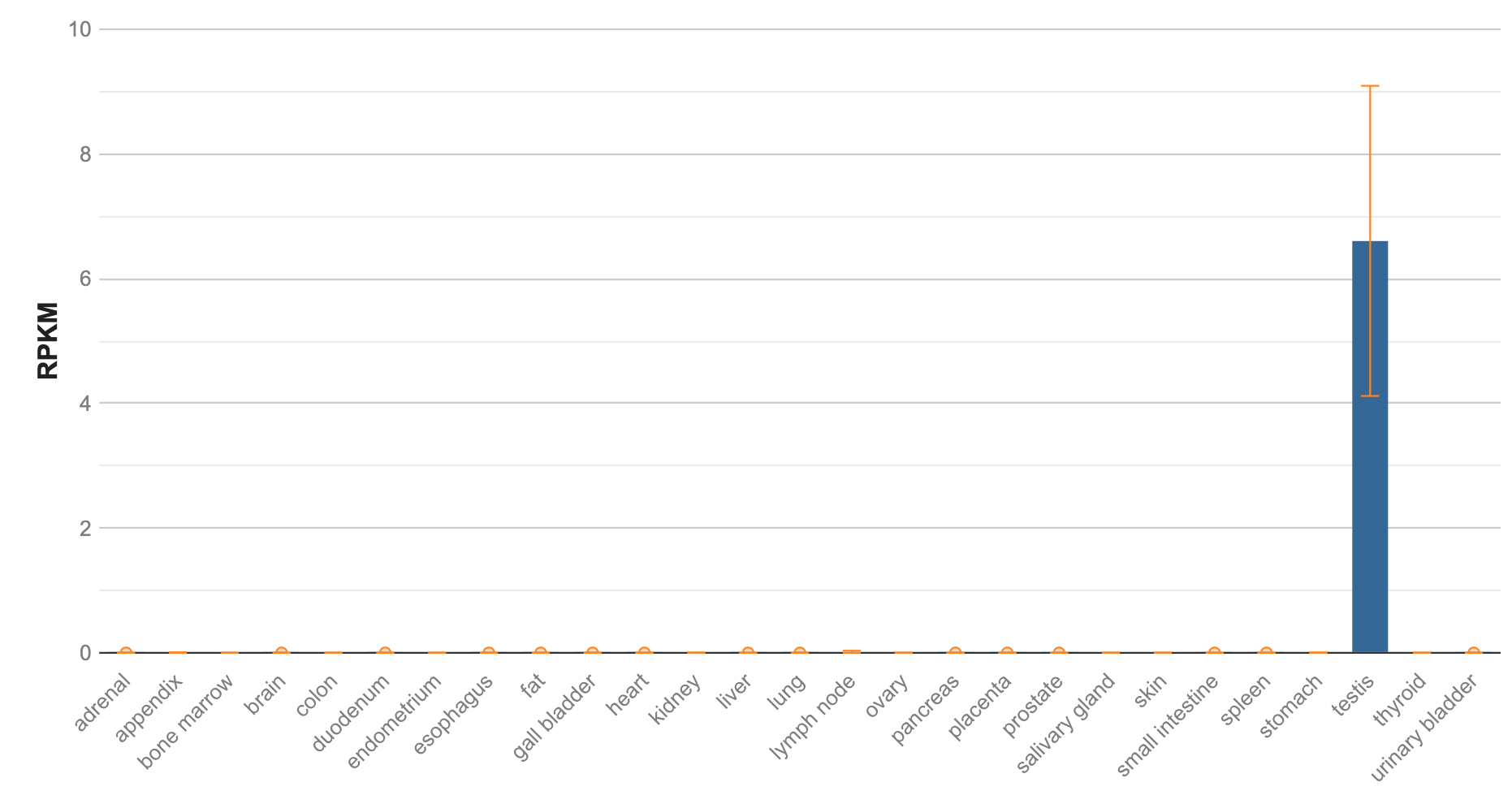
C6orf10 Tissue Expression Profile for adults. Orange dots indicate a very low level of expression while the blue bar indicates high expression.

== Regulation of expression ==
=== Transcriptional ===
TSBP1 has a promoter that is 1206 bases long. This promoter overlaps with the 3' UTR but ends before the first codon. This promoter is fairly well conserved across primates except for a 136 nucleotide region midway through and the end of the promoter region. Primates have insertions at these two regions that humans are missing. This may suggest that these regions of the promoter are not essential to humans.

==== Transcription factors ====
TSBP1 transcription is regulated by the binding of many transcription factors to the promoter region. The CCAAT binding protein and TATA box are highly conserved regions that are important in the initiation of transcription. Several of the transcription factors including EH1, NACA, NKX5-2, SIX4, VCR, etc. are involved in developmental pathways.

Abbreviation	Transcription factor full name	Matrix score	Strand
CSRNP-1	Cytosine-Serine rich nuclear protein 1(AXUD1, AXIN1 up-regulated-1)	1.0	+
CCAAT Box	CCAAT/enhancer binding protein (C/EBP), gamma	0.923	+
EH1	Engrailed Homeobox 1	0.862	+
Cart-1	Cartilage homeoprotein 1	0.997	-
ZFP 263	Zinc finger protein 263, ZKSCAN12 (Zinc finger protein with KRAB and SCAN domains 12)	0.921	+
SWI/SNF	SWI/SNF related, matrix associated, actin dependent regulator of chromatin, subfamily, a member 3	0.999	-
TATA Box	Vertebrate TATA binding protein factor	0.899	+
HSF2	Heat shock Factor 2	0.974	-
Hmx2/Nkx5-2	Hmx2/Nkx5-2 homeodomain transcription factor	0.933	+
Pdx1	Insulin promoter factor 1; pancreatic and duodenal homeobox 1 (Pdx1)	0.924	+
LMX1A	LIM homeobox transcription factor 1 alpha	1.0	+
NACA	Nascent polypeptide-associated complex subunit alpha 1	1.0	-
Oct1	Octamer binding factor 1	0.921	+
POU6F1	POU class 6 homeobox 1	0.973	+
STAT 5B	Signal transducer and activator of transcription 5B	0.973	+
SIX 4	Sine oculis homeobox homolog 4	0.96	-
NMP4	Nuclear matrix protein 4	0.971	+
MSX	Homeodomain proteins MSX-1 and MSX-2	0.989	-
AREB6	Atp1a1 regulatory element binding factor 6	1.0	-
VCR	Vertebrate caudal related homeodomain protein	0.963	+

== Protein Interactions ==
Most of the predicted protein interactions with C6orf10 are based solely on text mining and information gathered from genome-wide association studies. The two proteins with the highest interaction scores were Butyrophilin-like protein 2 (BTNL2) and Tetratricopeptide repeat domain containing TTC32. BTNL2 is a negative regulator of T-cell activity and member of the immunoglobulin superfamily. BTNL2 is located in the C6orf10 gene neighborhood. TTC32 is from a protein family of structural repeat motifs that mediate protein-protein interactions in the formation of protein-protein complexes. This may indicate the potential for C6orf10 to interact with another protein for form a complex.

== Clinical significance ==
C6orf10 has been found to be associated with both neurodegenerative diseases and autoimmune diseases. These associations are mostly obtained from genome wide association studies. Common neurodegenerative diseases associated with C6orf10 include frontotemporal dementia, Parkinson's disease, and Alzheimer's disease. Autoimmune diseases associated with C6orf10 include Rheumatoid arthritis, psoriasis, multiple sclerosis, Grave's disease and lupus.

== Homologs ==
=== Orthologs ===
By searching the NCBI BLAST database for protein-protein interactions, it was found that C6orf10 is a protein only found in mammals. The BLAST database found the highest number of homologs in the Primates, Artiodactyla, and Carnivora. There were only a couple of homologs in the taxonomic orders of Rodentia, Chiroptera, and Perissodactyla. In the orders of Scandentia, Eulipotyphyla, Tubulidentata and sirenia there was only one complete homolog, but a few partial sequences do exist. There were partial protein sequences in Lagomorpha, Dermoptera, and Macroscelidea and there were no orthologs in Diprotodontia, Didelphimorphia, Cetacea, Dasyuromorphia, Pilosa, Monotremata, and Proboscidea. No homologs were found outside of mammals.

=== C6orf10 Isoform X4 Orthologs ===
	Latin Name	Common Name	Identity	Median Date of divergence (MYA)
Primates	Homo sapiens	Human	100%	0
Primates	Gorilla gorilla gorilla	Gorilla	83.36%	8.61
Primates	Pongo abelii	Sumatran Orangutan	82.81%	15.2
Carnivora	Canis lupus familiaris	Dog	49.79%	94
Carnivora	Canis lupus dingo	Australian Dog	49.33%	94
Artiodactyla	Bubalus bubalis	Water Buffalo	49.16%	94
Artiodactyla	Equus caballus	Horse	49.00%	94
Artiodactyla	Odocoileus virginianus texanus	White Tailed Deer	44.59%	94
Rodentia	Chinchilla lanigera	Chinchilla	41.99%	88
Rodentia	Mus caroli	Ryuku mouse	41.06%	88
Carnivora	Felis catus	Cat	40.77%	94
Rodentia	Rattus norvegicus	Brown Rat	37.45%	88

=== Paralogs ===
C6orf10 has one paralog that diverged about 135.6 million years ago. This paralog is called Thioredoxin domain containing protein 2 (TXNDC2).

[1] BLAST: Basic Local Alignment Search Tool. National Center for Biotechnology InformationAvailable at: [https://blast.ncbi.nlm.nih.gov/Blast.cgi nih.gov]. Accessdate 4 March 2019.
