= TMEM101 =

Protein and gene in humans

Identifiers
- Aliases: TMEM101, transmembrane protein 101
- External IDs: MGI: 1923797; HomoloGene: 12649; GeneCards: TMEM101; OMA:TMEM101 - orthologs

Gene location (Human)
Chr.	Chromosome 17 (human)
Band	17q21.31	Start	44,011,188 bp
Band	17q21.31	End	44,023,946 bp

Gene location (Mouse)
Chr.	Chromosome 11 (mouse)
Band	11|11 D	Start	102,043,372 bp
Band	11|11 D	End	102,047,230 bp
RNA expression pattern
Bgee	Human / Mouse (ortholog); Top expressed in: endometrium; seminal vesicula; body of pancreas; mucosa of transverse colon; tendon of biceps brachii; muscle of thigh; body of stomach; stromal cell of endometrium; right uterine tube; buccal mucosa cell / Top expressed in: motor neuron; cumulus cell; medullary collecting duct; renal corpuscle; internal carotid artery; external carotid artery; lens; fossa; pineal gland; primitive streak; More reference expression data
BioGPS	n/a
Gene ontology
Molecular function	signal transducer activity
Cellular component	integral component of membrane; membrane
Biological process	positive regulation of I-kappaB kinase/NF-kappaB signaling; signal transduction
Sources:Amigo / QuickGO
Orthologs
Species	Human	Mouse
Entrez	84336	76547
Ensembl	ENSG00000091947	ENSMUSG00000020921
UniProt	Q96IK0	Q91VP7
RefSeq (mRNA)	NM_001304813; NM_001304814; NM_032376	NM_029649
RefSeq (protein)	NP_001291742; NP_001291743; NP_115752	NP_083925
Location (UCSC)	Chr 17: 44.01 – 44.02 Mb	Chr 11: 102.04 – 102.05 Mb
PubMed search
- Wikidata
View/Edit Human	View/Edit Mouse

Transmembrane protein 101 (TMEM101) is a protein that in humans is encoded by the TMEM101 gene. The TMEM101 protein has been demonstrated to activate the NF-κB signaling pathway. High levels of expression of TMEM101 have been linked to breast cancer.

== Gene ==
=== Aliases ===
Known aliases of TMEM101 include Putative NF-Kappa-B-Activating Protein 130, FLJ23987, and MGC4251.

=== Location ===
TMEM101 is located on the minus strand of the long arm of human chromosome 17 at the locus 17q21.31. The gene is 12,758 bp long, and it ranges from position 44,011,188 to position 44,023,946 on chromosome 17. TMEM101 is located between the genes NAGS and LSM12.

=== Transcript Variants ===
NCBI RefSeq contains five mRNA transcript variants for TMEM101. Transcript variants 1, 2, and 3 have been found experimentally, while transcript variants X1 and X2 have been predicted computationally. The last three exons of all five transcript variants are identical. The second exon is identical in transcript variants 2 and 3. The first exon of variant X1 and the second exon of variant X2 are nearly identical to the second exon of variants 2 and 3, but both contain an additional segment of bases at the 3’ end of this exon, and the first exon of variant X1 has 6 extra bases on the 5’ end. The first exon differs considerably in length between variants 2, X2, and 3.

Transcript variants of TMEM101 mRNA
Name	Accession Number	Number of Exons	Size (bp)
Transcript Variant 1	NM_032376.4	4	1525
Transcript Variant X1	XM_024451006.1	4	1602
Transcript Variant 2	NM_001304813.2	5	1726
Transcript Variant X2	XM_011525353.2	5	4604
Transcript Variant 3	NM_001304814.2	5	1759

== Protein ==
Homo sapiens TMEM101 conceptual translation

=== Isoforms ===
There are two known isoforms of the TMEM101 protein. Isoform a is encoded by transcript variant 1, while isoform b is encoded by transcript variants 2 and 3. Transcript variants X1 and X2 are also predicted to encode isoform b. Isoform b lacks the first 58 amino acids following the N-terminus of isoform a, but the remaining 199 amino acids are identical to isoform a.

Isoforms of the TMEM101 protein
Name	Accession Number	Size (aa)	Predicted molecular weight (kDa)
Isoform a	NP_115752.1	257	29
Isoform b	NP_001291742.1	199	22

=== Protein Characteristics ===
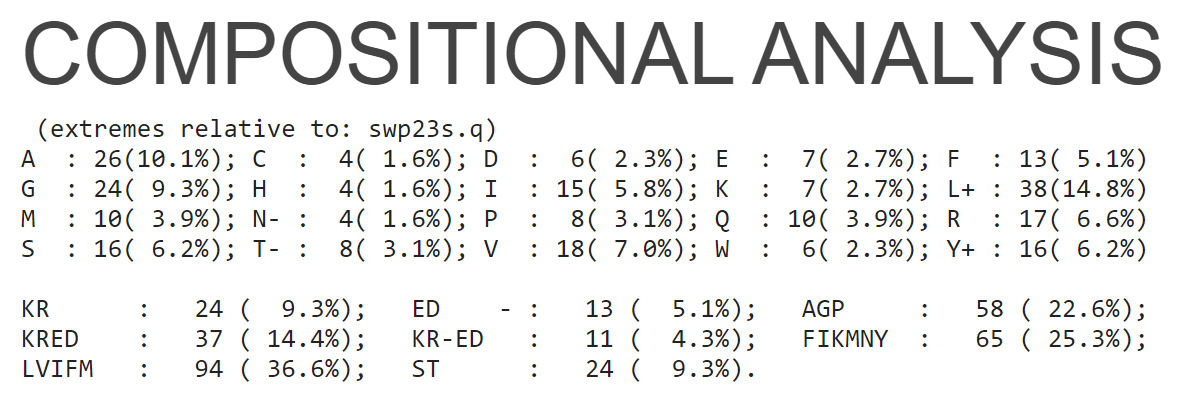
Amino acid compositional analysis (SAPS)

Isoform a of the TMEM101 protein has a predicted molecular weight of about 29 kDa and a theoretical isoelectric point of about 9.6. In terms of amino acid composition, TMEM101 is relatively rich in the hydrophobic amino acids leucine and tyrosine, and relatively poor in the hydrophilic amino acids asparagine and threonine. It is also relatively poor in the sum of the two negatively charged amino acids, aspartic acid and glutamic acid.

=== Transmembrane Domains ===
Isoform a of the TMEM101 protein contains 8 transmembrane domains.

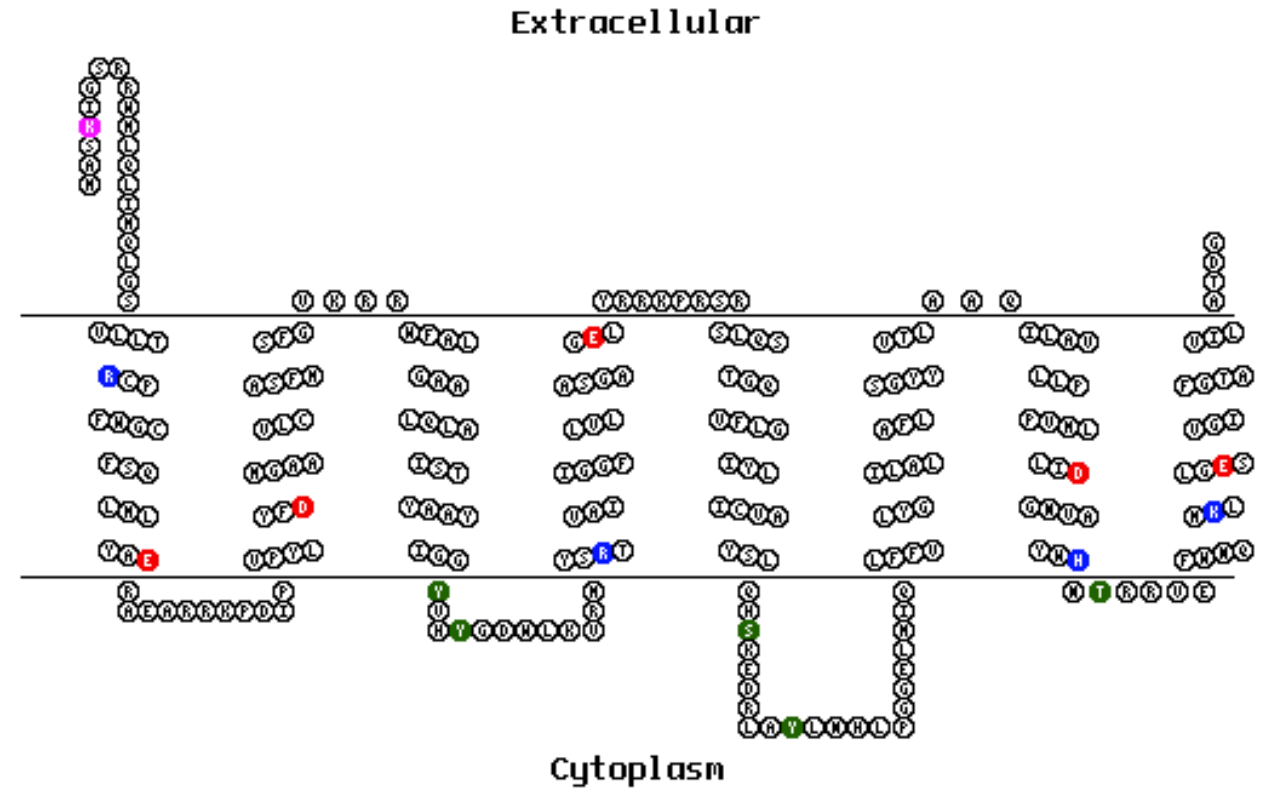
Schematic illustration of transmembrane domains and predicted post-translational modification sites

Transmembrane domains of the TMEM101 protein (isoform a)
Transmembrane Domain	Amino Acids
1	21-40
2	52-72
3	77-97
4	110-130
5	139-159
6	182-202
7	206-226
8	233-257

=== Secondary Structure ===
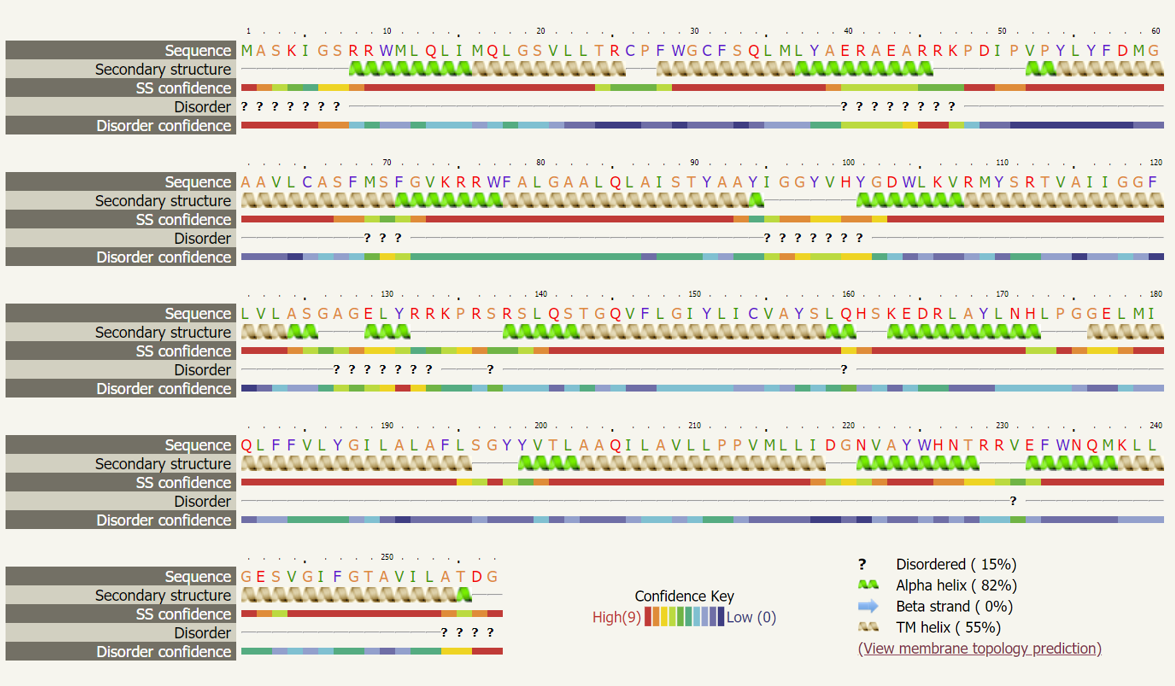
Predicted secondary structure (Phyre2)

The Ali2D, I-TASSER, and Phyre2 models all predict that the secondary structure of TMEM101 is predominately composed of alpha helices. The Phyre2 prediction is presented in the figure to the right.

=== Tertiary Structure ===
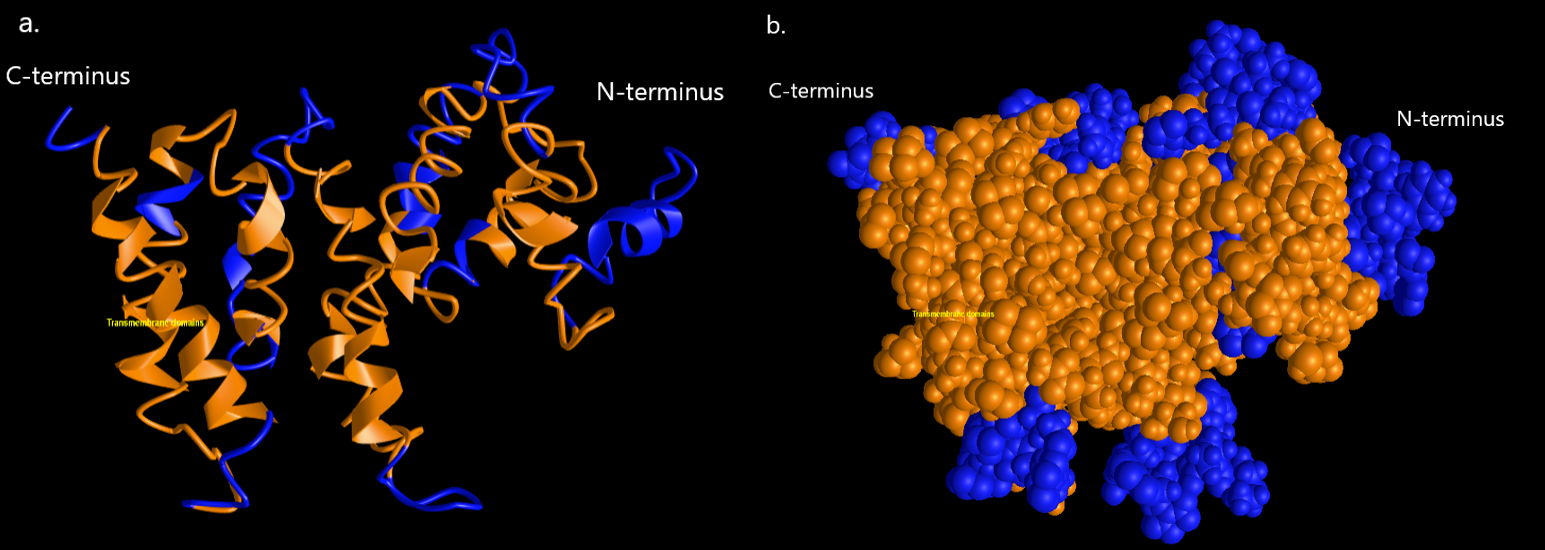
Predicted tertiary structure (I-TASSER)

The I-TASSER highest confidence model for the predicted tertiary structure for the TMEM101 protein resembles the structure of a polytopic transmembrane alpha-helical protein.

=== Post-translational Modifications ===
==== Acetylation ====
The lysine at position 4 in the TMEM101 protein is predicted to be acetylated by the EP300 acetyltransferase enzyme.

==== Phosphorylation ====
There are five predicted phosphorylation sites located outside of transmembrane domains on the cytoplasmic side of the TMEM101 protein, which are listed in the table below.

Predicted phosphorylation sites in the TMEM101 protein
Position	Amino Acid
98	Tyrosine
101	Tyrosine
162	Serine
169	Tyrosine
228	Threonine

=== Subcellular Localization ===
Immunofluorescent staining experiments have detected the TMEM101 protein in the plasma membrane and the nucleoplasm.

== Regulation and Expression ==
=== Promoters ===
The Genomatix Gene2Promoter tool lists 7 promoter regions for the Homo sapiens TMEM101 gene. The promoter that is supported by the greatest number of mRNA transcripts is 1525 bp long and spans the base pairs 44014913–44016437 on the negative strand of human chromosome 17. This promoter overlaps the start of transcription of mRNA transcript variant 1.

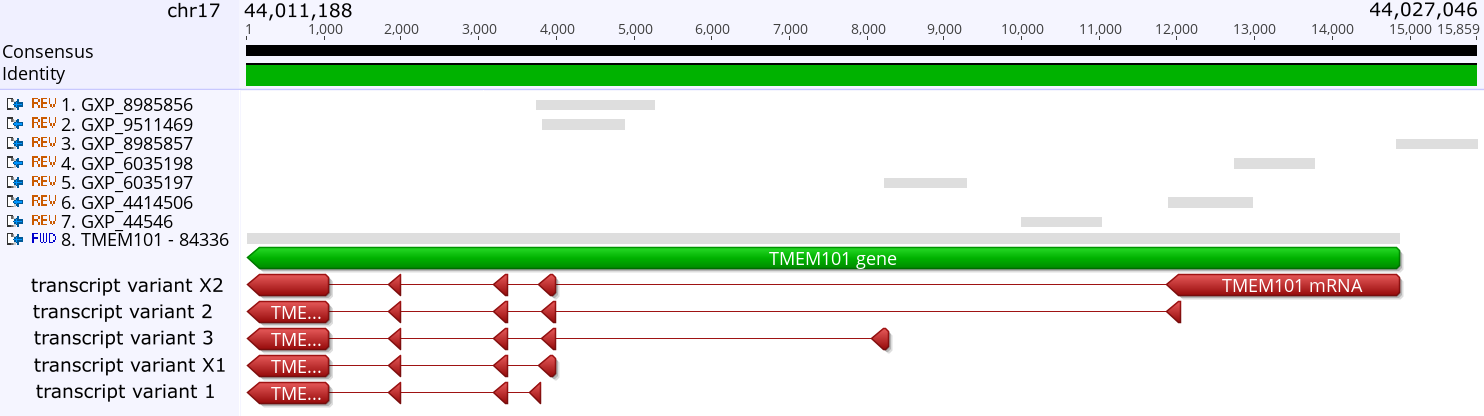
Alignment of promoters with the TMEM101 gene and mRNA transcript variants

Promoters for the TMEM101 gene (predicted by Genomatix Gene2Promoter)
Number	Promoter ID	Start position	End position	Length (bp)	Number of supporting transcripts
1	GXP_8985856	44014913	44016437	1525	5
2	GXP_9511469	44015003	44016042	1040	1
3	GXP_8985857	44026007	44027046	1040	1
4	GXP_6035198	44023907	44024946	1040	1
5	GXP_6035197	44019403	44020447	1045	3
6	GXP_4414506	44023067	44024152	1085	4
7	GXP_44546	44021160	44022199	1040	1

=== Transcription Factors ===
The following table presents a selected list of transcription factors that are predicted by the Genomatix MatInspector tool to bind to the GXP_8985856 promoter.

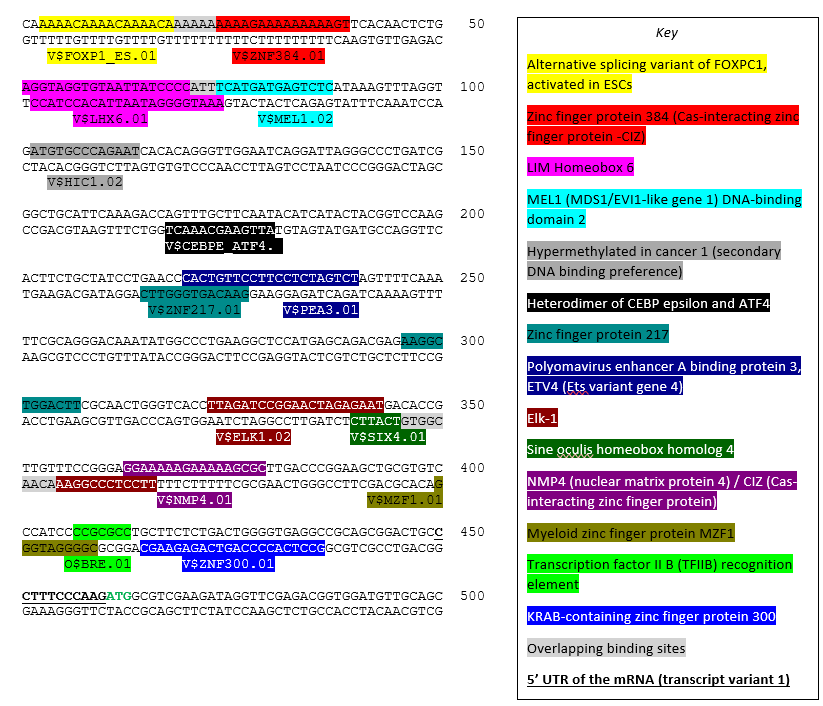
Predicted transcription factor binding sites

Selected transcription factors predicted to bind to the TMEM101 promoter (predicted by Genomatix MatInspector)
Transcription factor	Description
TFIIB	Transcription factor II B
FOXP1	Forkhead box protein P1
ZNF384	Zinc finger protein 384
ZNF300	KRAB-containing zinc finger protein 300
MZF1	Myeloid zinc finger protein MZF1
SIX4	Sine oculis homeobox homolog 4
ETV4	ETS translocation variant 4
ELK1	Elk-1
HIC1	Hypermethylated in cancer 1
ZNF217	Zinc finger protein 217
LHX6	LIM homeobox 6

=== Expression ===
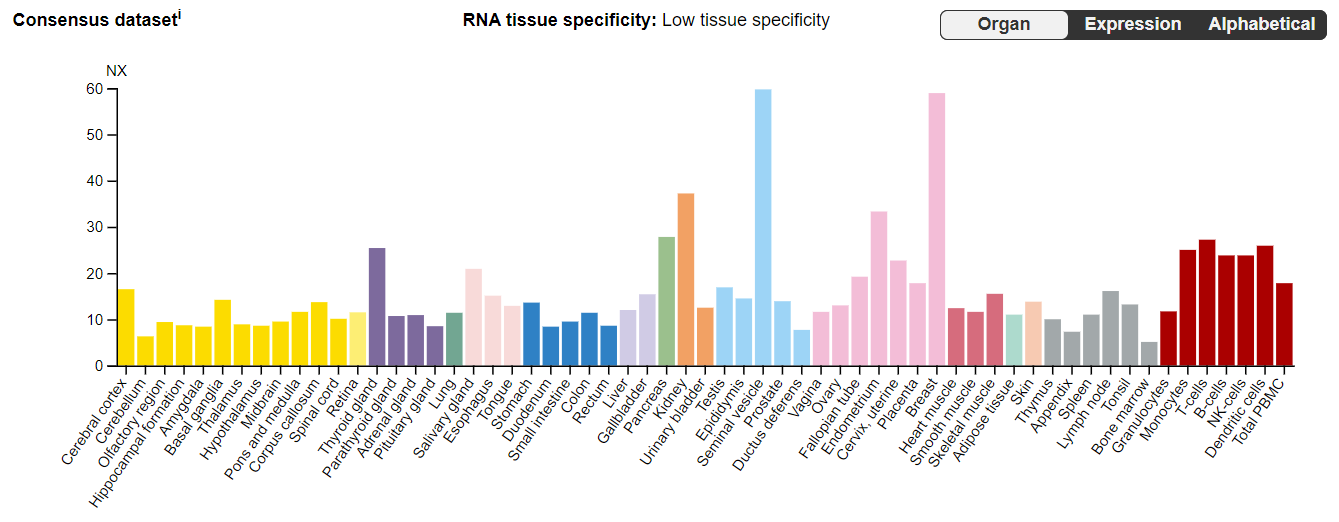
TMEM101 expression levels by tissue (Human Protein Atlas)

==== Tissue Specificity ====
According to RNA-Seq data, TMEM101 is expressed in a wide range of tissues with low tissue specificity. Relatively, it is expressed most highly in breast tissue, the seminal vesicles, the kidneys, and endometrial tissue.

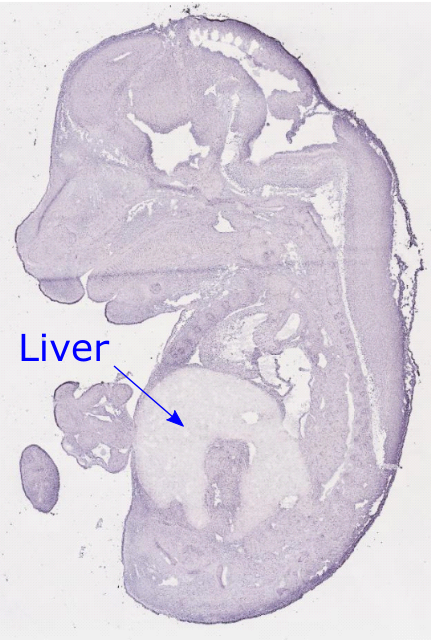
Expression in mouse embryo

==== Embryonic Development ====
A cross section of a mouse embryo that has been stained for TMEM101 mRNA using in situ hybridization techniques shows noticeably lower levels of TMEM101 transcript in the liver than in other tissues.

==== Differential Expression ====
TMEM101 has been observed to be expressed at lower levels in ovarian endometriotic cells than in uterine endometrial cells within the same individuals.

TMEM101 has also been observed to be expressed at higher levels in estrogen receptor positive ovarian cancer tumors than in estrogen receptor negative ovarian cancer tumors in mouse xenograft models.

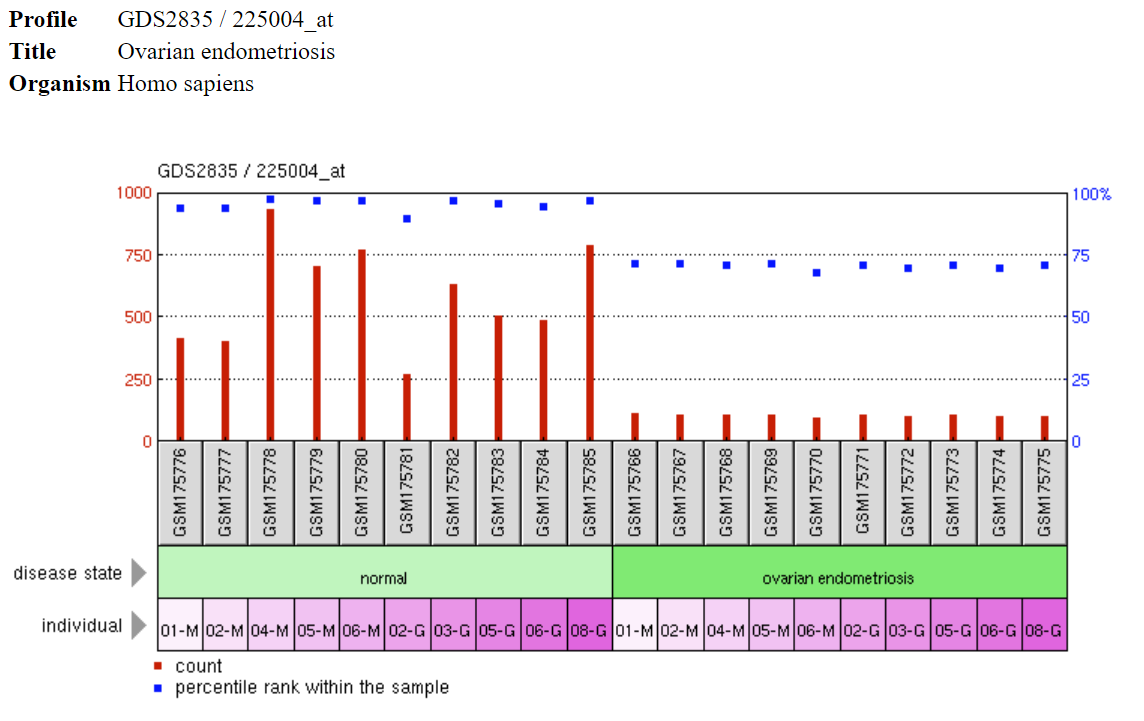
TMEM101 expression in ovarian endometriotic vs uterine endometrial cells

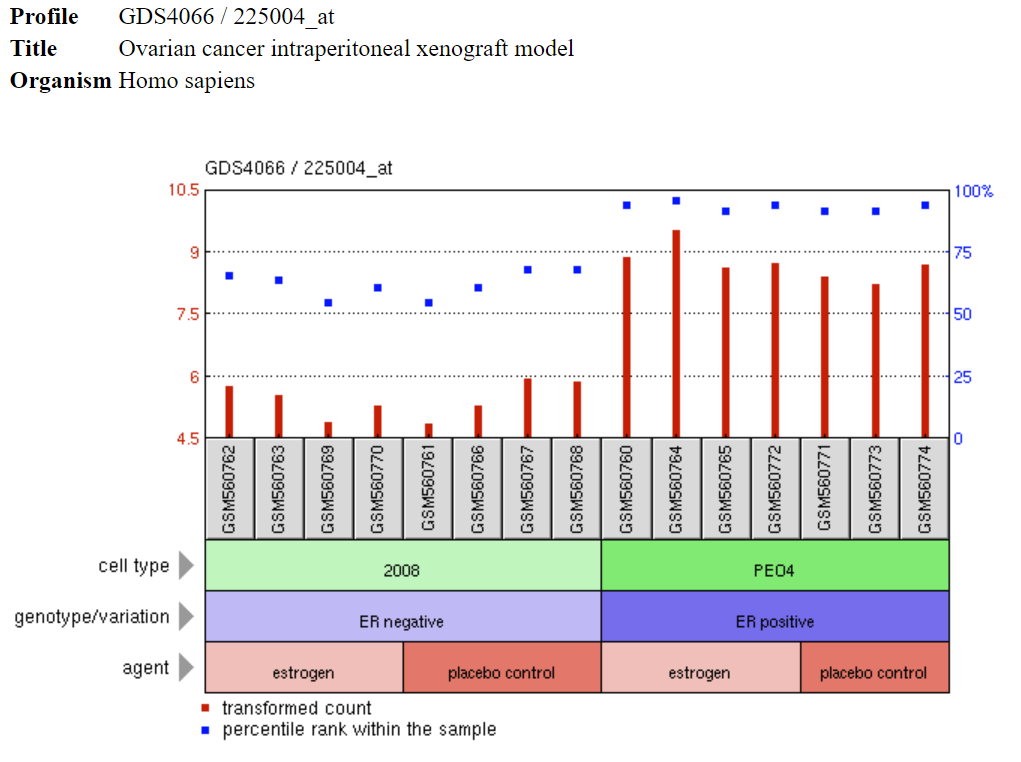
TMEM101 expression in ER positive vs ER negative ovarian tumors

== Interacting Proteins ==
The IntAct database indicates that the following proteins that have been found to interact with the TMEM101 protein through two-hybrid screening experiments.

TMEM101 interacting proteins (from IntAct database)
Protein	Description
BNIP3	BCL2/adenovirus E1B 19 kDA protein-interacting protein 3
C4orf3	Uncharacterized protein C4orf3
GIMAP1	GTPase IMAP family member 1
NDUFA3	NADH dehydrogenase [ubiquinone] 1 alpha subcomplex subunit 3
NINJ2	Ninjurin-2
PDZK1IP1	PDZK1-interacting protein 1
PKMYT1	Membrane-associated tyrosine- and threonine-specific cdc2-inhibitory kinase
STRIT1	Sarcoplasmic/endoplasmic reticulum calcium ATPase regulator DWORF
STX10	Syntaxin-10
SYNJ2BP	Synaptojanin-2-binding protein
TMEM65	Transmembrane protein 65
TMEM243	Transmembrane protein 243
VAMP1	Vesicle-associated membrane protein 1
VAMP2	Vesicle-associated membrane protein 2
VAPB	Vesicle-associated membrane protein-associated protein B/C

== Homology and Evolution ==
=== Orthologs and paralogs ===
TMEM101 has orthologs in Mammalia, Sauropsida, Amphibia, Osteichthyes, Chondrichthyes, Mollusca, Annelida, Echinodermata, Cnidaria, and Placozoa, among others. A table of selected orthologs is listed below. There are no known paralogs of TMEM101.

Selected orthologs of the Homo sapiens TMEM101 protein
Genus and species	Common name	Taxonomic group	Estimated Date of Divergence (MYA)	Accession Number	Sequence length (aa)	Sequence identity ! !Sequence similarity	
Phascolarctos cinereus	Koala	Marsupialia	159	XP_020853077.1	257	89%	95%
Gallus gallus	Chicken	Aves	312	XP_003643860.1	257	80%	89%
Notechis scutatus	Tiger snake	Squamata	312	XP_026525463.1	257	79%	91%
Xenopus Tropicalis	Tropical clawed frog	Anura	351.8	NP_988884.1	255	76%	88%
Danio rerio	Zebrafish	Actinopterygii	435	NP_001314814.1	255	72%	86%
Acanthaster planci	Crown-of-thorns starfish	Echinodermata	684	XP_022105916.1	252	34%	51%
Crassotrea gigas	Pacific oyster	Mollusca	797	XP_011422883.2	251	30%	51%
Pocillopora damicornis	Lace coral	Cnidaria	824	XP_027044925.1	264	32%	52%
Trichoplax adhaerens	Trichoplax	Placozoa	948	XP_002108737.1	260	28%	51%

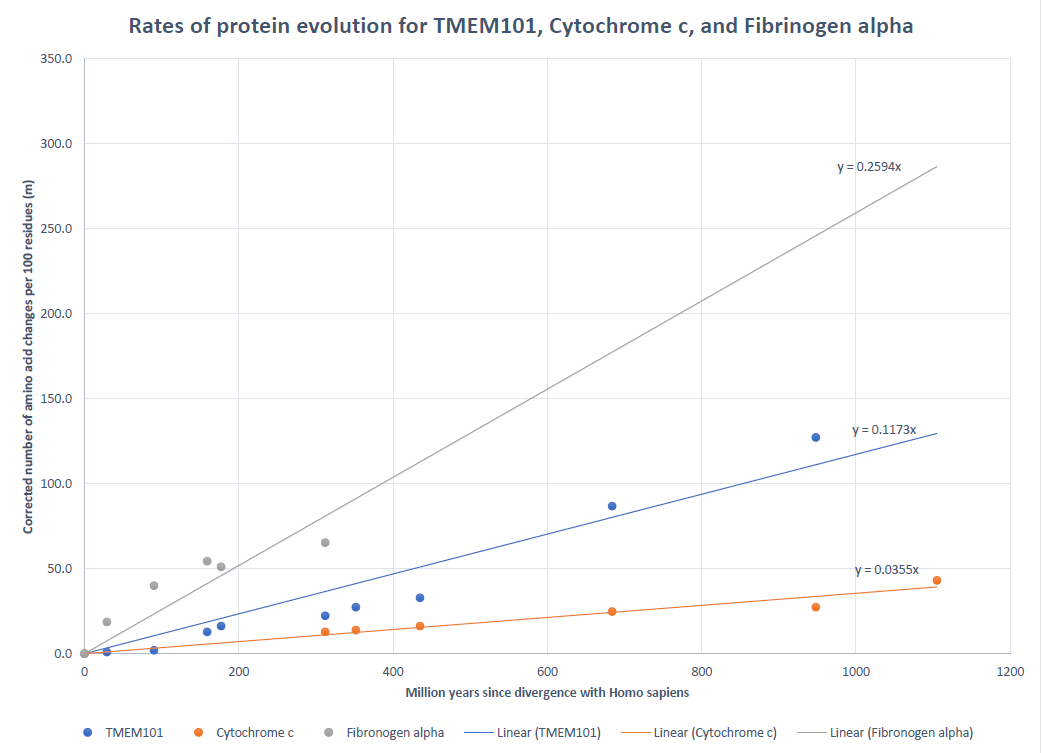
Relative protein evolution rates of TMEM101, Cytochrome c, and Fibrinogen alpha

=== Evolutionary History ===
The most distantly related species to humans that possesses an ortholog of TMEM101 is Trichoplax adhaerens. Given that Ctenophorans do not possess orthologs of TMEM101, it appears that TMEM101 originated in the basal ParaHoxozoa clade after its divergence from Ctenophora approximately 948 million years ago. Based on a molecular clock analysis, the protein sequence of TMEM101 has on average evolved faster than Cytochrome c but slower than Fibrinogen alpha.

== Function ==
=== Activation of NF-κB Signaling Pathway ===
TMEM101 cDNA transcripts have been demonstrated to activate the transcription of NF-κB controlled genes in human embryonic kidney cells.

=== Clinical Significance ===
TMEM101 has been noted as a biomarker of breast cancer. High expression of TMEM101 is associated with the Luminal molecular subtype of breast cancer. Additionally, high levels of TMEM101 are associated with an increased risk score for the diagnosis of early stage triple-negative breast cancer.
