= Hic =

Hic or HIC may refer to:

- Habitat International Coalition
- Hybrid integrated circuit
- Head injury criterion, a measure of the likelihood of head injury generated by crash tests
- Heart Institute of the Caribbean, Jamaica
- Helvetian Investment Club, a student association at University of St. Gallen
- HIC1, the protein encoded by the human HIC1 gene
- HIC2, the protein encoded by the human HIC2 gene
- Hipparcos Input Catalogue, an astronomical catalogue
- Humanitarian Information Centers, managed by the United Nations Office for the Coordination of Humanitarian Affairs
- Hydrophobic Interaction Chromatography, a chemistry technique
- The onomatopoeia for the sound made when hiccuping

== See also ==
- Hi-C (disambiguation)
