= HICS =

Hics or HICS may refer to:

- Hospital incident command system, emergency response and preparedness system for hospitals in the United States
- Holt International Children's Services, adoption agency based in Eugene, Oregon, United States
- Hawaii Inter-Island Cable System, fiber optic telecommunication cable system
- The Hics, English electronic band formed in London in 2012
- Hardened Intersite Cable Systems, communications systems for a missile launch control center

== See also ==
- Hic (disambiguation)
