= NKX-homeodomain factor =

Class of proteins

NKX-homeodomain factors are a family of homeodomain transcription factors that are critical regulators of organ development.

Human genes that encode NKX-homeodomain factors include:

- NKX1-1, NKX1-2
- NKX2-1, NKX2-2, NKX2-4, NKX2-8
- NKX3-1, NKX3-2
- NKX6-1, NKX6-2, NKX6-3
