= SPDEF =

Protein-coding gene in the species Homo sapiens

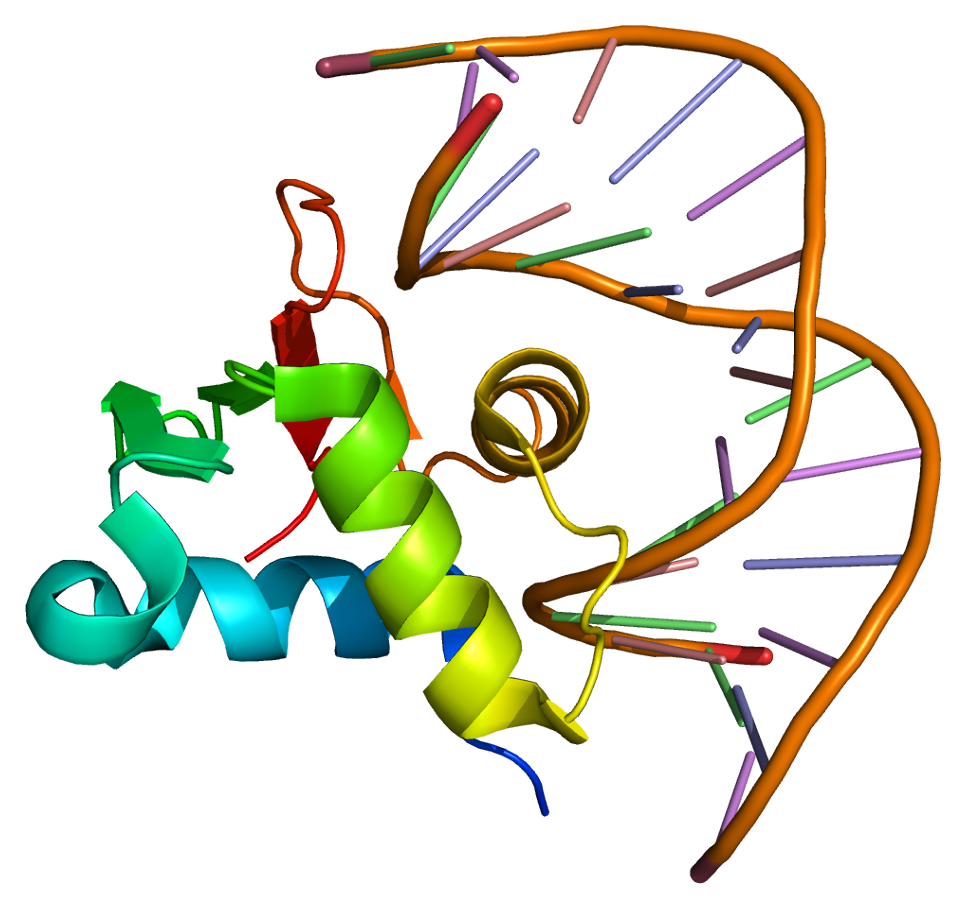

Identifiers
- Aliases: SPDEF, PDEF, bA375E1.3, SAM pointed domain containing ETS transcription factor
- External IDs: OMIM: 608144; MGI: 1353422; GeneCards: SPDEF
Available structures
PDB	Ortholog search: PDBe RCSB
PDB	List of PDB id codes 2DKX

Gene location (Human)
Chr.	Chromosome 6 (human)
Band	6p21.31	Start	34,537,802 bp
Band	6p21.31	End	34,556,333 bp

Gene location (Mouse)
Chr.	Chromosome 17 (mouse)
Band	17|17 A3.3	Start	27,933,326 bp
Band	17|17 A3.3	End	27,947,929 bp
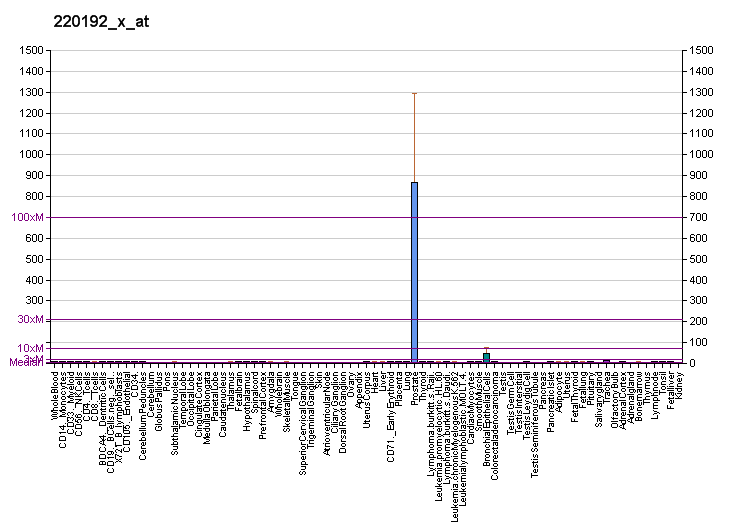

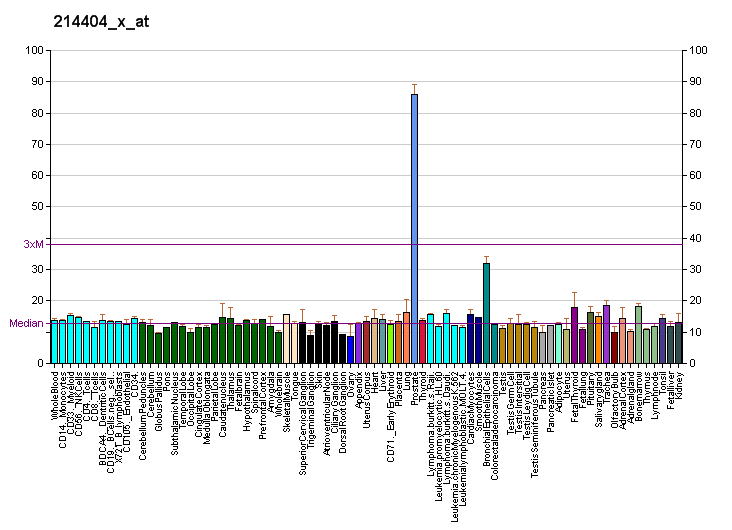

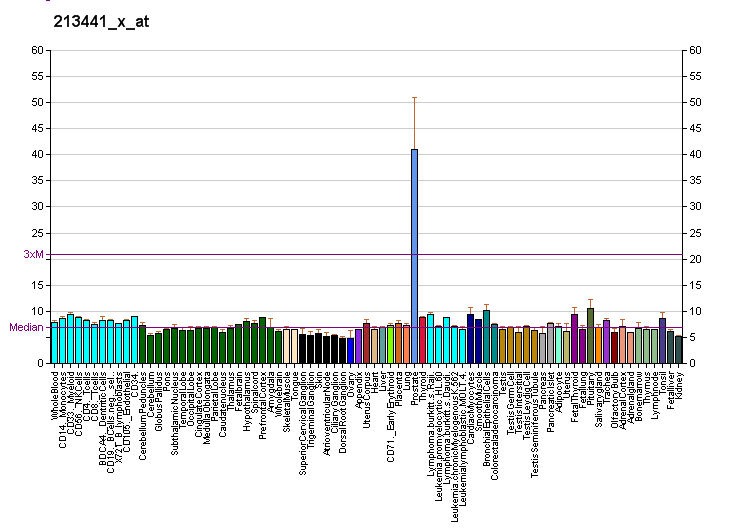
RNA expression pattern
Bgee	Human / Mouse (ortholog); Top expressed in: parotid gland; nasal epithelium; mucosa of transverse colon; prostate; mucosa of ileum; olfactory zone of nasal mucosa; buccal mucosa cell; trachea; mucosa of sigmoid colon; lactiferous duct / Top expressed in: crypt of lieberkuhn of small intestine; gastric mucosa; epithelium of stomach; mucous cell of stomach; pyloric antrum; Paneth cell; parotid gland; duodenum; female urethra; seminal vesicula; More reference expression data
BioGPS	More reference expression data
Gene ontology
Molecular function	DNA-binding transcription factor activity; DNA binding; DNA-binding transcription repressor activity, RNA polymerase II-specific; sequence-specific DNA binding; DNA-binding transcription factor activity, RNA polymerase II-specific
Cellular component	nucleus
Biological process	multicellular organism development; cell differentiation; regulation of transcription, DNA-templated; negative regulation of transcription by RNA polymerase II; negative regulation of cell fate commitment; lung goblet cell differentiation; intestinal epithelial cell development; transcription, DNA-templated; positive regulation of cell fate commitment; positive regulation of transcription by RNA polymerase II; positive regulation of apoptotic process; regulation of transcription by RNA polymerase II
Sources:Amigo / QuickGO
Orthologs
Databases	NCBI: entry; OMA: entry
Species	Human	Mouse
Entrez	25803	30051
Ensembl	ENSG00000124664	ENSMUSG00000024215
UniProt	O95238	Q9WTP3
RefSeq (mRNA)	NM_001252294; NM_012391	NM_013891; NM_001357728
RefSeq (protein)	NP_001239223; NP_036523	NP_038919; NP_001344657
Location (UCSC)	Chr 6: 34.54 – 34.56 Mb	Chr 17: 27.93 – 27.95 Mb
PubMed search
- Wikidata
View/Edit Human	View/Edit Mouse

SAM pointed domain-containing Ets transcription factor is a protein that in humans is encoded by the SPDEF gene.

Originally named PDEF (Prostate derived ETS factor, also called PSE or prostate specific ETS), SPDEF is an ETS transcription factor expressed in prostate epithelial cells. In the gastrointestinal tract and lungs, it is expressed in mucus-secreting cells including intestinal and airway goblet cells, intestinal Paneth cells, gastric mucus gland and mucus neck cells, and Brunner's gland cells. In the prostate, SPDEF acts as an androgen-independent transactivator of PSA (MIM 176820) expression.[supplied by OMIM]

== Interactions ==
SPDEF has been shown to interact with NKX3-1.
