= Nkx2-2as =

NK2 transcription factor related, locus 2 (Drosophila), antisense

Identifiers
- Organism: mouse
- Symbol: Nkx2-2as
- Entrez: 100313531
- RefSeq (mRNA): NR_030769

Other data
- Chromosome: 2: 146.99 - 147.18 Mb

Nkx2-2as (Nkx2-2 antisense) is a long non-coding RNA. It is located in the cytoplasm of the cell. Nkx2-2as is involved in Neural development. Overexpression of Nkx2-2as results in increased levels of expression of the homeobox gene Nkx2-2 and enhances induction of the differentiation of oligodendrocytes. Besides Nkx2-2, Nkx2-2as may also regulate the expression of other genes.

== See also ==
- Long non-coding RNA
