= Ernest Madu =

Nuclear cardiologist

Doctor Ernest Madu
- Born: February 18, 1960 (age 66)
- Occupations: Cardiologist and Entrepreneur
- Title: Chairman and Founder of The Heart Institute of the Caribbean Managing Partner of IHS Group USA

Ernest Chijioke Madu (born February 18, 1960) is a nuclear cardiologist whose work focuses on providing affordable public healthcare in low-resource nations. He is the founder, chairman, and CEO of the Heart Institute of the Caribbean, which runs two clinics in Jamaica and one in the Cayman Islands. Madu's research concentrates on the management and health effects of globalization in susceptible populations. Richard Chazal, president of the American College of Cardiology, noted that Madu has made "great contributions to the College and to the international cardiovascular community."

== Honors and awards ==
Extramural honors and awards include:

- Named among the "100 Most Influential People in Healthcare" by Grupo Mídia at its awards ceremony held in Düsseldorf, Germany, at MEDICA 2017.
- Distinguished Award (International Service) from the American College of Cardiology (ACC). The award was presented at the Convocation of the college's 66th Annual Scientific Session in Washington, D.C., March 2017.
- Global Health Champion Award, 2016, University of Pennsylvania Perelman School of Medicine, USA.
- Named among "30 Most Influential in Public Health" by Masters Public Health, 2014.
- Nation Builder Award from National Commercial Bank (NCB). The award was presented at the NCB's annual national awards programme for Small and Medium Enterprises, October 2014.
- Innovation Award from National Commercial Bank (NCB). The award was presented at the NCB's annual national awards programme for Small and Medium Enterprises, October 2014.
- Corporate Social Responsibility Award for a Small Organization from AMCHAM Jamaica. The award was presented at the AMCHAM Business and Civic Leadership Awards for Excellence 2016, October 2015
- Corporate Social Responsibility Award for a Small Organization from AMCHAM Jamaica. The award was presented at the AMCHAM Business and Civic Leadership Awards for Excellence 2016, October 2016
- Civic Leadership Individual Award from AMCHAM Jamaica. The award was presented at the AMCHAM Business and Civic Leadership Awards for Excellence 2016, October 2016
