= Hi-C (disambiguation) =

Hi-C is a fruit-flavored beverage brand owned by The Coca-Cola Company

Hi-C may also refer to:

- Hi-C (rapper, born 1973), a Compton, California-based rapper, active mostly in the 1990s
- Hi-C (rapper, born 1998), a Nashville, Tennessee-based rapper, active in the 21st-century
- Hi-C (genomic analysis technique), a variant of the Chromosome conformation capture technique, used to study the conformation of an entire genome
- High Resolution Coronal Imager, a space telescope designed to take images of the Sun's atmosphere
- The C (musical note) above the top of the staff in treble clef

== See also ==
- Hic (disambiguation)
