= Heart Institute of the Caribbean =

The Heart Institute of the Caribbean is a cardiac hospital and care institute on the island of Jamaica, specializing in cardiology, cardiovascular medicine, and cardiovascular surgery.

The Heart Institute was founded in 2005 by cardiologist Ernest Madu. Headquartered in Kingston, Jamaica, the Heart Institute of the Caribbean also operates additional branches in Mandeville, Montego Bay, and Ocho Rios. In 2018, the Heart Institute established the first cardiac intensive care unit and heart surgery operating theatre on the island of Jamaica.

In 2017 the hospital was awarded the "International Service Award" from the American College of Cardiology.
