= Engrailed homeobox protein =

Engrailed homeobox C-terminal signature domain

Identifiers
- Symbol: Engrail_1_C_sig
- Pfam: PF10525
- InterPro: IPR019549
Available protein structures:
- PDB: IPR019549 PF10525 (ECOD; PDBsum)
- AlphaFold: IPR019549; PF10525

In molecular biology, the engrailed homeobox proteins are a family of homeobox proteins which are characterised by the presence of a region of some 20 amino-acid residues located at the C-terminal of the 'homeobox' domain. This region forms a signature pattern for this subfamily of proteins.
