= HIC2 =

Protein-coding gene in the species Homo sapiens

Identifiers
- Aliases: HIC2, HRG22, ZBTB30, ZNF907, hypermethylated in cancer 2, HIC ZBTB transcriptional repressor 2
- External IDs: OMIM: 607712; MGI: 1929869; GeneCards: HIC2

Gene location (Human)
Chr.	Chromosome 22 (human)
Band	22q11.21	Start	21,417,371 bp
Band	22q11.21	End	21,451,463 bp

Gene location (Mouse)
Chr.	Chromosome 16 (mouse)
Band	16|16 A3	Start	17,051,436 bp
Band	16|16 A3	End	17,081,294 bp
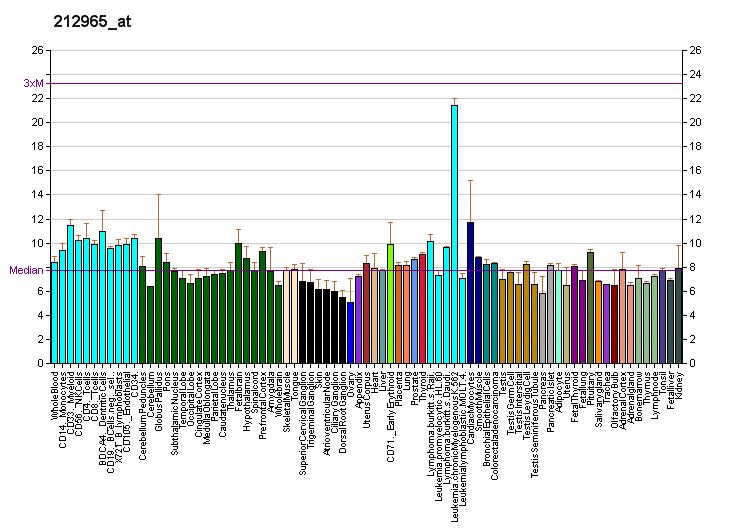

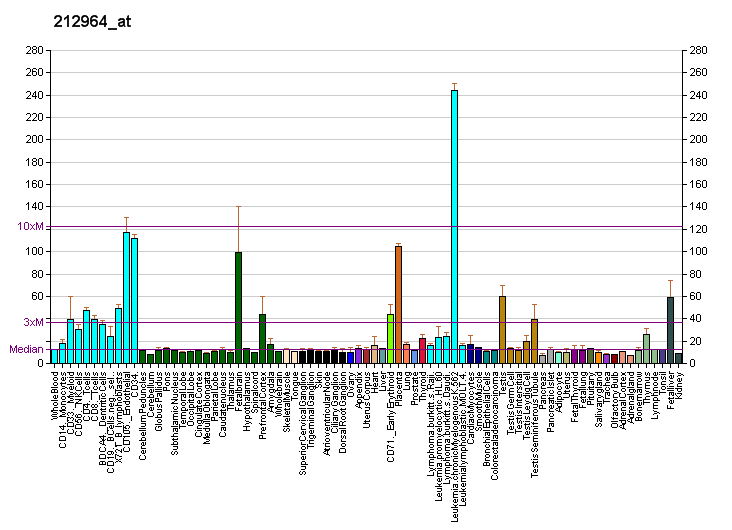

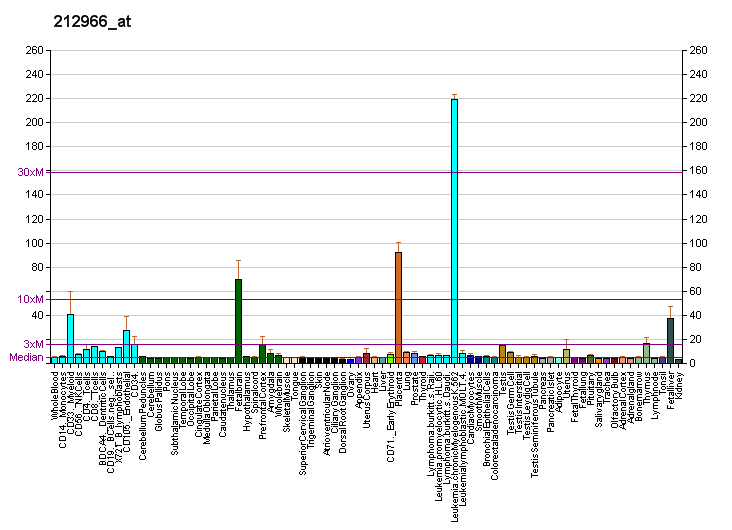
RNA expression pattern
Bgee	Human / Mouse (ortholog); Top expressed in: secondary oocyte; amniotic fluid; endothelial cell; placenta; gonad; vena cava; Brodmann area 23; parotid gland; Region I of hippocampus proper; gingival epithelium / Top expressed in: zygote; secondary oocyte; yolk sac; female urethra; blastocyst; abdominal wall; mandibular prominence; maxillary prominence; primitive streak; epiblast; More reference expression data
BioGPS	More reference expression data
Gene ontology
Molecular function	DNA binding; protein C-terminus binding; metal ion binding; nucleic acid binding; DNA-binding transcription factor activity, RNA polymerase II-specific; RNA polymerase II transcription regulatory region sequence-specific DNA binding; DNA-binding transcription repressor activity, RNA polymerase II-specific
Cellular component	nucleus
Biological process	negative regulation of transcription, DNA-templated; regulation of transcription, DNA-templated; transcription, DNA-templated; regulation of transcription by RNA polymerase II; negative regulation of transcription by RNA polymerase II
Sources:Amigo / QuickGO
Orthologs
Databases	NCBI: entry; OMA: entry
Species	Human	Mouse
Entrez	23119	58180
Ensembl	ENSG00000169635	ENSMUSG00000050240
UniProt	Q96JB3	Q9JLZ6
RefSeq (mRNA)	NM_015094	NM_178922
RefSeq (protein)	NP_055909	NP_849253
Location (UCSC)	Chr 22: 21.42 – 21.45 Mb	Chr 16: 17.05 – 17.08 Mb
PubMed search
- Wikidata
View/Edit Human	View/Edit Mouse

Hypermethylated in cancer 2 protein is a protein that in humans is encoded by the HIC2 gene.
