= NKX2-2 =

Protein-coding gene in the species Homo sapiens

Identifiers
- Aliases: NKX2-2, NKX2.2, NKX2B, NK2 homeobox 2
- External IDs: OMIM: 604612; MGI: 97347; GeneCards: NKX2-2

Gene location (Human)
Chr.	Chromosome 20 (human)
Band	20p11.22	Start	21,511,017 bp
Band	20p11.22	End	21,514,064 bp

Gene location (Mouse)
Chr.	Chromosome 2 (mouse)
Band	2 G2|2 72.63 cM	Start	147,177,546 bp
Band	2 G2|2 72.63 cM	End	147,194,243 bp
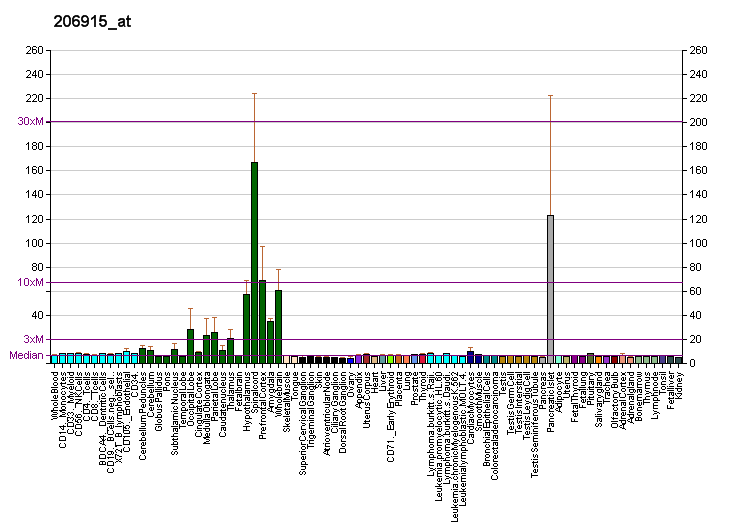
RNA expression pattern
Bgee	Human / Mouse (ortholog); Top expressed in: inferior ganglion of vagus nerve; subthalamic nucleus; medulla oblongata; superior vestibular nucleus; ventral tegmental area; inferior olivary nucleus; spinal cord; C1 segment; external globus pallidus; pars reticulata / Top expressed in: islet of Langerhans; lumbar subsegment of spinal cord; optic nerve; central gray substance of midbrain; ventral nucleus of lateral geniculate body; embryo; anterior horn of spinal cord; nucleus of stria terminalis; hypothalamus; cerebellar cortex; More reference expression data
BioGPS	More reference expression data
Gene ontology
Molecular function	sequence-specific DNA binding; DNA binding; DNA-binding transcription factor activity; transcription factor binding; chromatin binding; transcription coactivator activity; cis-regulatory region sequence-specific DNA binding; DNA-binding transcription factor activity, RNA polymerase II-specific; RNA polymerase II cis-regulatory region sequence-specific DNA binding
Cellular component	intracellular anatomical structure; nucleoplasm; nucleus
Biological process	positive regulation of oligodendrocyte differentiation; cell differentiation; regulation of transcription, DNA-templated; negative regulation of neuron differentiation; pancreatic PP cell fate commitment; response to organic cyclic compound; cell development; spinal cord oligodendrocyte cell fate specification; response to progesterone; neuron fate specification; response to glucose; transcription, DNA-templated; nervous system development; multicellular organism development; brain development; astrocyte differentiation; positive regulation of gene expression; positive regulation of neuron differentiation; positive regulation of cell differentiation; regulation of cell differentiation; smoothened signaling pathway; oligodendrocyte development; spinal cord motor neuron differentiation; digestive tract development; pancreatic A cell fate commitment; type B pancreatic cell fate commitment; ventral spinal cord interneuron fate determination; type B pancreatic cell development; spinal cord oligodendrocyte cell differentiation; optic nerve development; positive regulation of transcription by RNA polymerase II; positive regulation of DNA-binding transcription factor activity; endocrine pancreas development
Sources:Amigo / QuickGO
Orthologs
Databases	NCBI: entry; OMA: entry
Species	Human	Mouse
Entrez	4821	18088
Ensembl	ENSG00000125820	ENSMUSG00000027434
UniProt	O95096	P42586
RefSeq (mRNA)	NM_002509	NM_001077632; NM_010919
RefSeq (protein)	NP_002500	NP_001071100; NP_035049
Location (UCSC)	Chr 20: 21.51 – 21.51 Mb	Chr 2: 147.18 – 147.19 Mb
PubMed search
- Wikidata
View/Edit Human	View/Edit Mouse

Homeobox protein Nkx-2.2 is a protein that in humans is encoded by the NKX2-2 gene.

Homeobox protein Nkx-2.2 contains a homeobox domain and may be involved in the morphogenesis of the central nervous system. This gene is found on chromosome 20 near NKX2-4, and these two genes appear to be duplicated on chromosome 14 in the form of TITF1 and NKX2-8. The encoded protein is likely to be a nuclear transcription factor.

The expression of Nkx2-2 is regulated by an antisense RNA called Nkx2-2as.

In the developing spinal cord, Nkx-2.2 regulates IRX3 thereby contributing to the proper differentiation of the ventral horn neurons.
