= NKX3-1 =

Protein-coding gene in the species Homo sapiens

Identifiers
- Aliases: NKX3-1, BAPX2, NKX3, NKX3.1, NKX3A, NK3 homeobox 1
- External IDs: OMIM: 602041; MGI: 97352; GeneCards: NKX3-1
Available structures
PDB	Ortholog search: PDBe RCSB
PDB	List of PDB id codes 2L9R

Gene location (Human)
Chr.	Chromosome 8 (human)
Band	8p21.2	Start	23,678,697 bp
Band	8p21.2	End	23,682,938 bp

Gene location (Mouse)
Chr.	Chromosome 14 (mouse)
Band	14 D2|14 36.02 cM	Start	69,428,087 bp
Band	14 D2|14 36.02 cM	End	69,432,111 bp
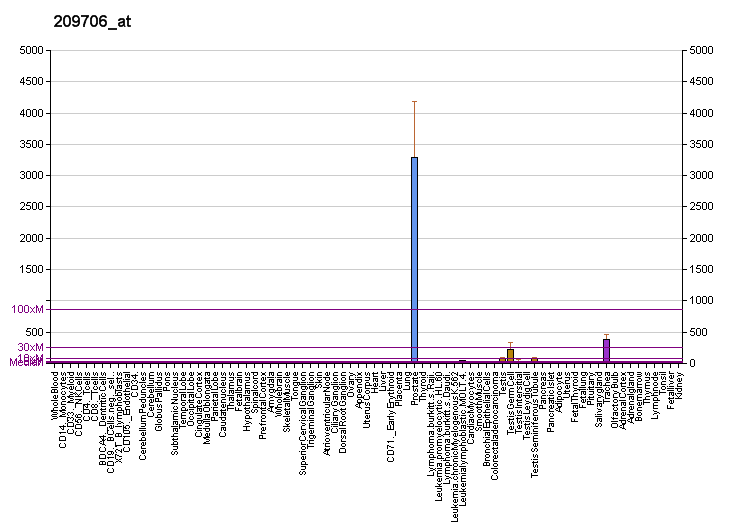

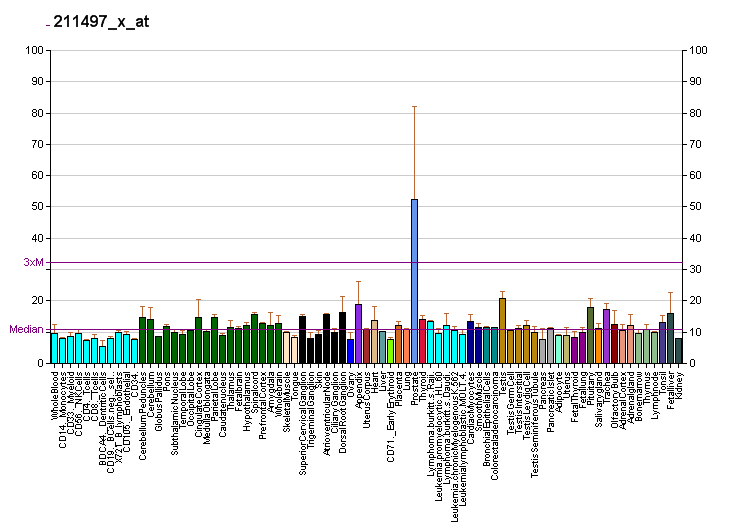

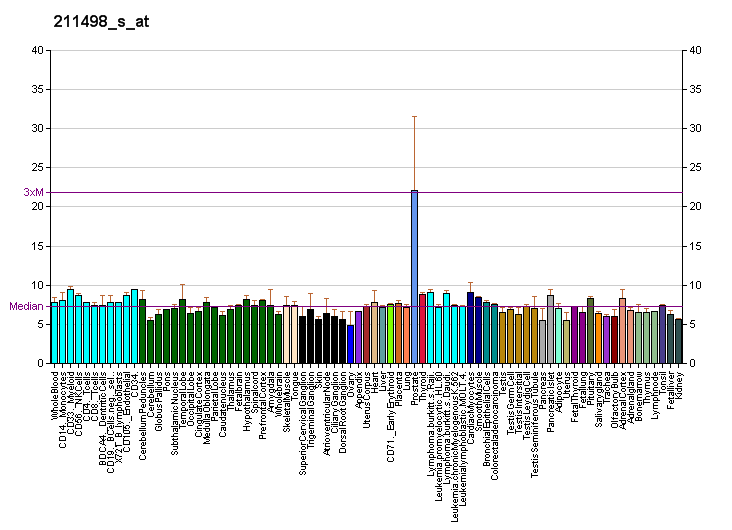
RNA expression pattern
Bgee	Human / Mouse (ortholog); Top expressed in: palpebral conjunctiva; secondary oocyte; sperm; prostate; trachea; germinal epithelium; urethra; testicle; mucosa of nose; minor salivary glands / Top expressed in: prostatic epithelium; vasculature of trunk; urethral gland (male); bulbo-urethral gland; descending aorta; renal artery; dorsal aorta; anterior lobe of prostate; gastrula; incisor; More reference expression data
BioGPS	More reference expression data
Gene ontology
Molecular function	sequence-specific DNA binding; DNA binding; DNA-binding transcription factor activity; transcription factor binding; histone deacetylase binding; transcription cis-regulatory region binding; RNA polymerase II general transcription initiation factor activity; estrogen receptor activity; protein kinase activator activity; protein self-association; MADS box domain binding; protein binding; cysteine-type endopeptidase activator activity involved in apoptotic process; estrogen receptor binding; DNA-binding transcription factor activity, RNA polymerase II-specific; RNA polymerase II cis-regulatory region sequence-specific DNA binding; nuclear receptor activity
Cellular component	intracellular anatomical structure; nucleus; site of DNA damage
Biological process	somitogenesis; androgen receptor signaling pathway; cellular response to steroid hormone stimulus; dorsal aorta development; positive regulation of protein phosphorylation; male gonad development; positive regulation of cell death; regulation of transcription, DNA-templated; protein kinase B signaling; response to testosterone; epithelial cell proliferation involved in salivary gland morphogenesis; cellular response to tumor necrosis factor; positive regulation of androgen secretion; positive regulation of mitotic cell cycle; positive regulation of apoptotic signaling pathway; prostate gland development; negative regulation of gene expression; transcription, DNA-templated; multicellular organism development; positive regulation of transcription, DNA-templated; salivary gland development; development of the heart; positive regulation of cysteine-type endopeptidase activity involved in apoptotic process; positive regulation of gene expression; positive regulation of response to DNA damage stimulus; branching involved in prostate gland morphogenesis; negative regulation of epithelial cell proliferation involved in prostate gland development; positive regulation of cell population proliferation; cellular response to interleukin-1; negative regulation of epithelial cell proliferation; negative regulation of insulin-like growth factor receptor signaling pathway; urogenital system development; positive regulation of phosphatidylinositol 3-kinase signaling; metanephros development; negative regulation of transcription, DNA-templated; activation of cysteine-type endopeptidase activity involved in apoptotic process; branching morphogenesis of an epithelial tube; positive regulation of intrinsic apoptotic signaling pathway; positive regulation of cell division; cellular response to hypoxia; positive regulation of transcription by RNA polymerase II; negative regulation of cell population proliferation; negative regulation of mitotic cell cycle; pharyngeal system development; activation of protein kinase activity; regulation of protein localization; positive regulation of DNA-binding transcription factor activity; cell differentiation
Sources:Amigo / QuickGO
Orthologs
Databases	NCBI: entry; OMA: entry
Species	Human	Mouse
Entrez	4824	18095
Ensembl	ENSG00000167034	ENSMUSG00000022061
UniProt	Q99801	P97436
RefSeq (mRNA)	NM_001256339; NM_006167	NM_010921
RefSeq (protein)	NP_001243268; NP_006158	NP_035051
Location (UCSC)	Chr 8: 23.68 – 23.68 Mb	Chr 14: 69.43 – 69.43 Mb
PubMed search
- Wikidata
View/Edit Human	View/Edit Mouse

Homeobox protein Nkx-3.1, also known as NKX3-1, NKX3, BAPX2, NKX3A and NKX3.1 is a protein that in humans is encoded by the NKX3-1 gene located on chromosome 8p. NKX3-1 is a prostatic tumor suppressor gene.

NKX3-1 is an androgen-regulated, prostate-specific homeobox gene whose expression is predominantly localized to prostate epithelium. It acts as a transcription factor that has critical function in prostate development and tumor suppression. It is a negative regulator of epithelial cell growth in prostate tissue. The NKX3-1 homeobox protein is encoded by the NKX3-1 gene.

== Function ==
The homeodomain-containing transcription factor NKX3A is a putative prostate tumor suppressor that is expressed in a largely prostate-specific and androgen-regulated manner. Loss of NKX3A protein expression is a common finding in human prostate carcinomas and prostatic intraepithelial neoplasia.

== Gene ==
In humans, the NKX3-1 gene is located on chromosome 8p21.2 with 4 exons. The 8p chromosome is a region that is frequently reported to undergo a loss of heterozygosity (LOH) associated with tissue dedifferentiation and loss of androgen responsiveness during the progression of prostate cancer. LOH has been reported to be observed in 12-89% of high-grade prostatic intraepithelial neoplasia (PIN) and 35-86% of prostatic adenocarcinomas. The frequency of loss of heterozygosity on chromosome 8p is seen to increase with advanced prostate cancer grade and stage.

== Structure ==
NKX3-1 contains two exons encoding a 234 amino acid protein including a homeodomain. The 234 amino acids are 35-38 kDa. One N-terminal domain one homeodomain and one C-terminal domain are present. The observed interaction between NKX3-1 and Serum Response Factor (SRF)indicate that amino-terminal domains participate in the interaction. The synergistic transcriptional activation requires both interactions at multiple protein-protein interfaces and protein-DNA interactions. This indicates that one mechanism of NKX3-1 dependent transcriptional activation in prostate epithelia requires combinatorial interactions with other factors expressed within those cells

In 2000, full length NKX3-1 cDNA was obtained from a human prostate cDNA library. Korkmaz et al. identified 3 splice variants with deletions in the N-terminal region as well as a variant at position 137 within the homeobox domain. NKX3-1 expression was visualized using Fluorescence microscopy, utilizing GFP-NKX3-1 in the nucleus.

== Function ==
NKX3-1 expression acts as a transcription factor that has been found to play a main role in prostate development and tumor suppression. The loss of NKX3-1 expression is frequently observed in prostate tumorigenesis and has been seen to be a result of allelic loss, methylation, and post transcriptional silencing. NKX3-1 expression is seen in prostate epithelium, testis, ureter, and pulmonary bronchial mucous glands.

NKX3-1 binds to DNA to suppress transcription as well as interacts with transcription factors such as serum response factor, to enhance transcriptional activation. Wang et al. demonstrated that NKX3-1 marks a stem cell population that functions during prostate regeneration. Genetic lineage marking demonstrated that rare luminal cells that express NKX3-1 in the absence of testicular androgens are bipotential and can self-renew in vivo. Single-cell transplantation assays showed that castration-resistant NKX3-1 expressing cells (CARNs) can reconstitute prostate ducts in renal grafts. Functional assays of NKX3-1 mutant mice in serial prostate regeneration suggested that NKX3-1 is required for stem cell maintenance. Furthermore, targeted deletion of PTEN gene in CARNs resulted in rapid carcinoma formation after androgen-mediated regeneration. This indicates that CARNs represent a new luminal stem cell population that is an efficient target for oncogenic transformation in prostate cancer.

It has also been found to be essential in pluripotency of stem cells using Yamanaka factors.

== Regulation ==
In 2010 it was shown that NKX3-1 was controlled by ERG and ESE3 both directly and through induction of EZH2 (Polycomb group pcg).

== Discovery ==
Using a random cDNA sequencing approach, He et al. cloned a novel prostate-specific gene that encoded a homeobox-containing protein. The gene which they symbolized NKX3-1 encoded a 234-amino acid polypeptide with greatest homology to the Drosophila NK3 gene. Northern blot analysis showed that NKX3.1 had a uniquely restricted tissue expression pattern with mRNA being abundant in the prostate, lower levels in the testis and absent from all other tissues tested. The NKX3-1 protein expression was detected a hormone-responsive, androgen receptor-positive prostate cancer cell line, but was absent from androgen receptor-negative prostate cancer cell lines as well as other cell lines of varied origins. The link between androgen stimulation and NKX3-1 was discovered through the use of an androgen-dependent carcinoma line. The researchers suggested that the NKX3-1 gene plays a role in androgen-driven differentiation of prostatic tissue as well as in loss of differentiation during the progression of prostate cancer.

== Role in disease ==
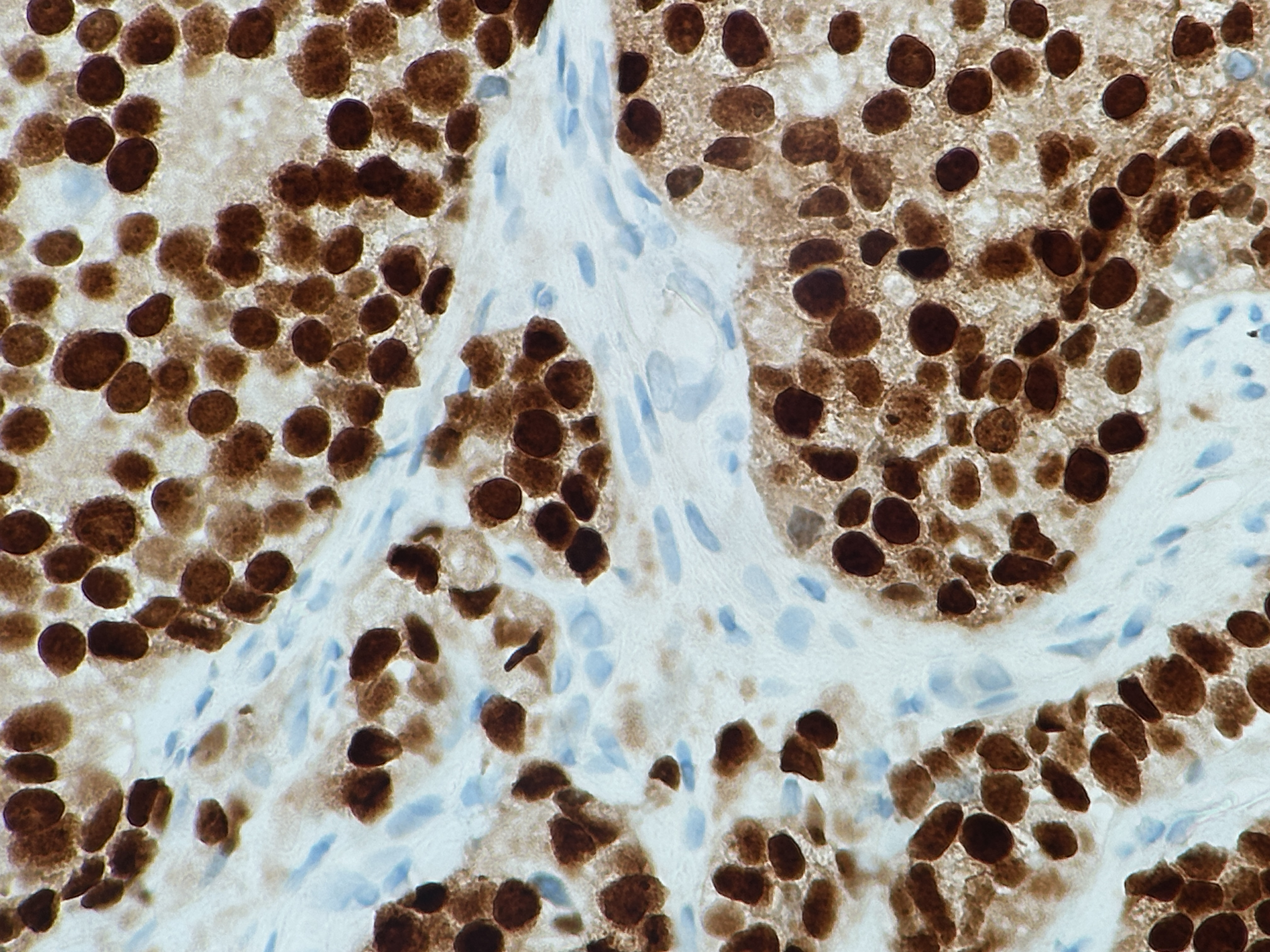
Immunohistochemistry for NKX3.1 in a lymph node, showing metastatic prostate cancer with nuclear staining.

Prostate cancer is the most commonly diagnosed cancer in American men and the second leading cause of cancer related deaths. Prostate cancer predominantly occurs in the peripheral zone of the human prostate, with fewer than 10% of cases found in the central zone. The disease develops as a result of the temporal and spatial loss of the basal epithelial compartment as well as increased proliferation and dedifferentiation of the luminal (secretory) epithelial cells. Prostate cancer is typically found in men of ages older than 60 and its incidence increases with increasing age.

NKX3-1 plays an essential role in normal murine prostate development. Loss of function of NKX3-1 leads to defects in prostatic protein secretions as well as ductal morphogenesis. Loss of function also contributes to prostate carcinogenesis.

Furthermore, immunohistochemistry using anti-NKX3-1 antibodies provides a sensitive and specific method for diagnosing metastatic prostatic adenocarcinomas in distant sites.

== Interactions ==
NKX3-1 has been shown to interact with SPDEF.

The stability of NKX3-1 protein has been shown to be regulated by phosphorylation.
