= NKX2-8 =

Transcription factor

Identifiers
- Aliases: NKX2-8, NKX2.8, NKX2H, Nkx2-9, NK2 homeobox 8, NKX 2-9
- External IDs: OMIM: 603245; MGI: 1270158; GeneCards: NKX2-8

Gene location (Human)
Chr.	Chromosome 14 (human)
Band	14q13.3	Start	36,580,004 bp
Band	14q13.3	End	36,582,614 bp

Gene location (Mouse)
Chr.	Chromosome 12 (mouse)
Band	12|12 C1	Start	56,658,174 bp
Band	12|12 C1	End	56,660,069 bp
RNA expression pattern
Bgee	Human / Mouse (ortholog); Top expressed in: C1 segment; right testis; left testis; left lobe of thyroid gland; anterior pituitary; hypothalamus; right lobe of thyroid gland; substantia nigra; olfactory zone of nasal mucosa; lower respiratory tract / Top expressed in: morula; embryo; embryo; endoderm; somite; spinal cord; mesoderm; ascending aorta; ectoderm; anterior horn of spinal cord; More reference expression data
BioGPS	n/a
Gene ontology
Molecular function	DNA-binding transcription factor activity; RNA polymerase II cis-regulatory region sequence-specific DNA binding; sequence-specific DNA binding; DNA binding; DNA-binding transcription activator activity, RNA polymerase II-specific; double-stranded DNA binding; DNA-binding transcription factor activity, RNA polymerase II-specific
Cellular component	nucleus; cellular component
Biological process	multicellular organism development; respiratory tube development; liver development; regulation of transcription, DNA-templated; transcription by RNA polymerase II; axonogenesis; transcription, DNA-templated; positive regulation of transcription by RNA polymerase II; lung development; negative regulation of epithelial cell proliferation; cell differentiation
Sources:Amigo / QuickGO
Orthologs
Databases	NCBI: entry; OMA: entry
Species	Human	Mouse
Entrez	26257	18094
Ensembl	ENSG00000136327	ENSMUSG00000058669
UniProt	O15522	O70584
RefSeq (mRNA)	NM_014360	NM_008701
RefSeq (protein)	NP_055175	NP_032727
Location (UCSC)	Chr 14: 36.58 – 36.58 Mb	Chr 12: 56.66 – 56.66 Mb
PubMed search
- Wikidata
View/Edit Human	View/Edit Mouse

Homeobox protein Nkx-2.8 (sometimes also called Nkx-2.9 especially in mice) is a protein that in humans is encoded by the gene NKX2-8. Nkx-2.8 is a transcription factor responsible for the formation of the branchial and visceral motor neuron subtypes of cranial motor nerves in vertebrates. Nkx-2.8 works together with another transcription factor, Nkx 2.2, to direct neural progenitor cells to their cell fate.

== Gene defects ==
Cell lineage analysis of Nkx 2.9 and Nkx 2.2 double knockout (deficient) mouse embryos shows that cranial nerve alterations are a result of changes in neuronal progenitor cell fate. The trigeminal nerve is not affected in the double knockout mouse embryos, indicating that cell fate alteration is limited to the caudal hindbrain; that Nkx 2.9 and Nkx 2.2 proteins do not play a role in branchial or visceral motor neuron development in the portion of the hindbrain superior to neuromere 4.

Disturbance of Nkx 2.9 and Nkx 2.2 in mouse embryos results in the total loss of the spinal accessory and vagal motor nerves, and a partial loss of the glossopharyngeal and facial motor nerves. However, the somatic hypoglossal and abducens motor nerves are not disrupted.
