= Hawaii Inter-Island Cable System =

Submarine communications cable system

Hawaii Inter-Island Cable System, HICS
- Owners: Hawaiian Telcom
- Landing points: Lihue Terminal, Wailua Point, Kauai; Ko Olina Terminal, Kahe Point, Oahu; Koko Head Terminal, Sandy Beach, Oahu; Kihei Terminal, Mokapu, Maui; Kawaihae Terminal, Spencer Beach, Island of Hawaii
- Total length: 480 km
- Design capacity: 2.5 Gbit/s
- Date of first use: July 1994

HICS or Hawaii Inter-Island Cable System is a fiber optic submarine telecommunications cable system linking together six of the eight main Hawaiian Islands with each other.

It has landing points in:

- Lihue Terminal, Wailua Point, Kauai, Hawaii, U.S.A.
- Ko Olina Terminal, Kahe Point, Oahu, Hawaii, U.S.A.
- Koko Head Terminal, Sandy Beach, Oahu, Hawaii, U.S.A.
- Kihei Terminal, Mokapu, Maui, Hawaii, U.S.A.
- Kawaihae Terminal, Spencer Beach, Island of Hawaii, U.S.A.

It has a transmission capacity of 2.5 Gbit/s, and a total cable length of 298 miles (480 km). It started operation on July 20, 1994, and is operated and maintained by Hawaiian Telcom.
