= Allregulin =

Transmembrane protein in humans

ARLN

Identifiers
- Aliases: ARLN, chromosome 4 open reading frame 3, HCVFTP1, ALN, allregulin, C4orf3
- External IDs: MGI: 1914954; GeneCards: ARLN

Gene location (Human)
Chr.	Chromosome 4 (human)
Band	4q26	Start	119,296,419 bp
Band	4q26	End	119,304,445 bp

Gene location (Mouse)
Chr.	Chromosome 3 (mouse)
Band	3|3 G1	Start	122,717,852 bp
Band	3|3 G1	End	122,719,833 bp
RNA expression pattern
Bgee	Human / Mouse (ortholog); Top expressed in: endothelial cell; skin of arm; inferior ganglion of vagus nerve; medulla oblongata; superior vestibular nucleus; subthalamic nucleus; pons; saphenous vein; human penis; urethra / Top expressed in: esophagus; stomach; lung; urinary bladder; ileum; duodenum; yolk sac; bone marrow; proximal tubule; pancreas; More reference expression data
BioGPS	n/a
Orthologs
Databases	NCBI: entry; OMA: entry
Species	Human	Mouse
Entrez	401152	67704
Ensembl	ENSG00000164096	ENSMUSG00000054091
UniProt	Q8WVX3	Q99M08
RefSeq (mRNA)	NM_001170330; NM_001001701	NM_024461
RefSeq (protein)	NP_001001701; NP_001163801	NP_077781
Location (UCSC)	Chr 4: 119.3 – 119.3 Mb	Chr 3: 122.72 – 122.72 Mb
PubMed search
- Wikidata
View/Edit Human	View/Edit Mouse

Allregulin (ARLN) is a protein which in humans is encoded by the ARLN gene (previously C4orf3). ARLN is a small ER transmembrane protein that regulates calcium homeostasis through SERCA (sarco-endoplasmic reticulum calcium ATPase). It is also known as C4orf3 and HCVFTP1 (hepatitis C virus F protein-transactivated protein 1).

== Gene ==
Chromosome 4 open reading frame 3 is a protein encoding gene that is located on chromosome 4 with specific location 4q26. It has a total of 3 exons. The gene acts upstream or within negative regulation of ATPase-coupled calcium transmembrane transporter activity. The protein encoded by this gene is located in the endoplasmic reticulum membrane as an integral component. It is ubiquitously expressed in the esophagus, fat, and kidney. It is a newly discovered tissue specific regulator of SERCA (sarco-endoplasmic reticulum calcium ATPase), its function to interact with the inhibitory groove of SERCA.

== mRNA ==
C4orf3 transcript variant 1 encodes for a mRNA sequence that is 2975 nucleotides in length. It is composed of three exons, two of which are embedded in the coding sequence and one that spans the rest of the sequence. There is no 5' UTR because the coding sequence begins at the beginning of the sequence and the 3' UTR is 209 nucleotides long.

== Protein ==
ARLN is a small ER transmembrane protein that regulates calcium homeostasis through SERCA. The molecular weight is 7.6 kDa. Isoform 1 is 199 amino acids long, however there is also a smaller isoform, that is 66 amino acids long. The second isoform is the latter part of the first isoform. The protein and its orthologs are rich in arginine. There is a transmembrane domain present near the C-terminus (amino acids 177-199). This transmembrane domain is well conserved in orthologs.

== Homology ==
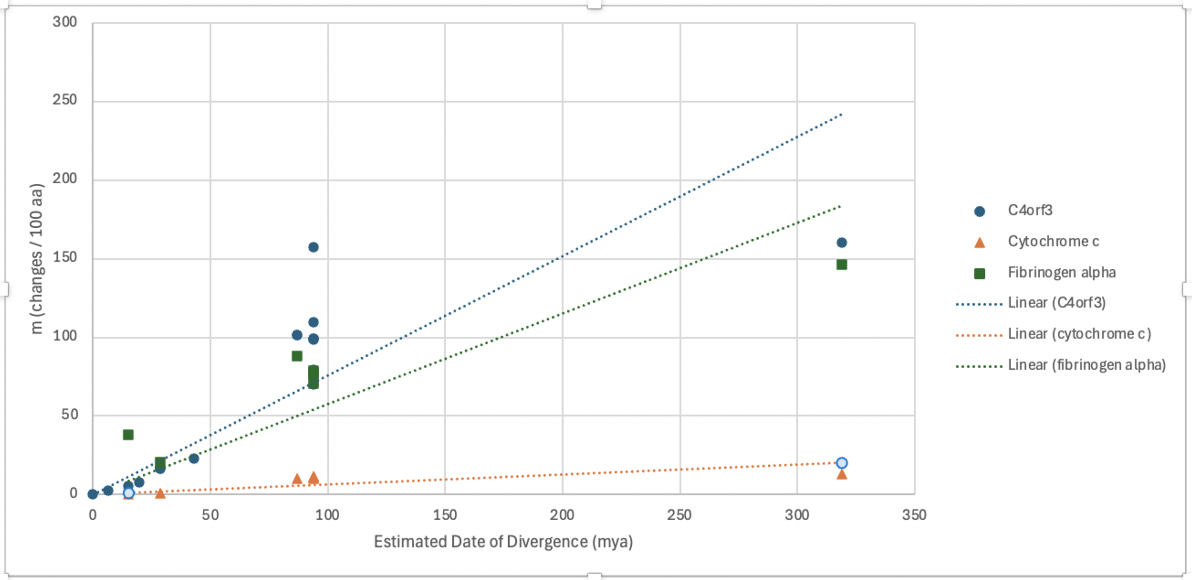
Graph illustrating the relationship between the estimated date of divergence and the m value for all 20 orthologs of C4orf3 and a few species from each group for cytochrome c and fibrinogen alpha.

C4orf3 orthologs are found in most mammals, mainly in primates, but also in whales, dolphins, foxes and other mammals. There is one bird (Phalacrocorax carbo) where a C4orf3 ortholog is found. The C-terminus of the protein is highly conserved in these orthologs.

There are no human paralogs present for the gene.
