= ZKSCAN1 =

Protein-coding gene in the species Homo sapiens

Identifiers
- Aliases: ZKSCAN1, 9130423L19Rik, KOX18, PHZ-37, ZNF139, ZNF36, ZSCAN33, zinc finger with KRAB and SCAN domains 1
- External IDs: OMIM: 601260; MGI: 1921820; GeneCards: ZKSCAN1

Gene location (Human)
Chr.	Chromosome 7 (human)
Band	7q22.1	Start	100,015,572 bp
Band	7q22.1	End	100,041,689 bp

Gene location (Mouse)
Chr.	Chromosome 5 (mouse)
Band	5|5 G2	Start	138,083,346 bp
Band	5|5 G2	End	138,106,084 bp
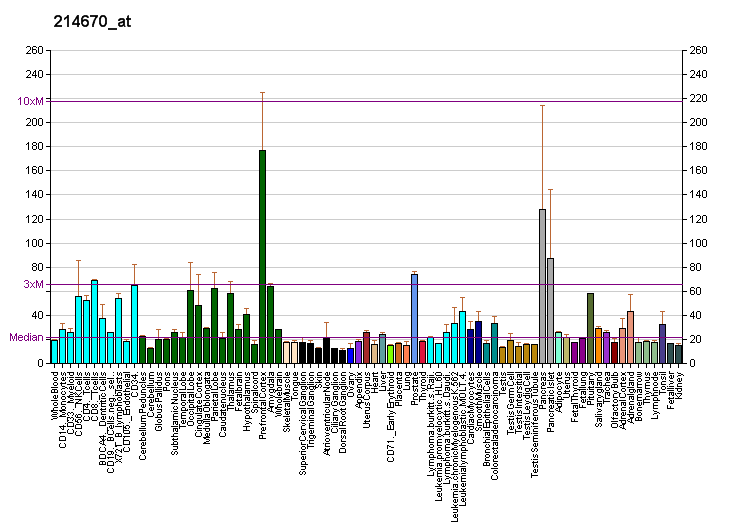

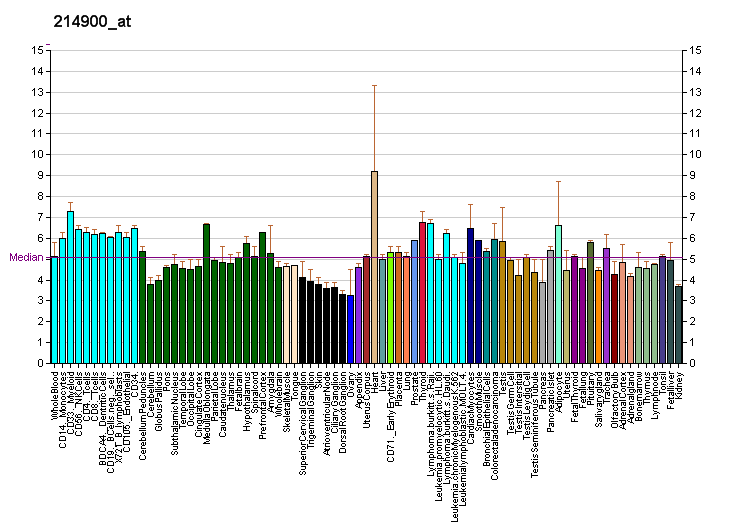
RNA expression pattern
Bgee	Human / Mouse (ortholog); Top expressed in: skin of thigh; bronchial epithelial cell; skin of hip; inferior ganglion of vagus nerve; external globus pallidus; subthalamic nucleus; pars reticulata; pylorus; pars compacta; cardia / Top expressed in: medullary collecting duct; hand; condyle; genital tubercle; urothelium; cumulus cell; fossa; transitional epithelium of urinary bladder; vas deferens; renal corpuscle; More reference expression data
BioGPS	More reference expression data
Gene ontology
Molecular function	protein binding; nucleic acid binding; metal ion binding; DNA binding; DNA-binding transcription factor activity; DNA-binding transcription factor activity, RNA polymerase II-specific
Cellular component	intracellular anatomical structure; nucleus
Biological process	regulation of transcription, DNA-templated; transcription, DNA-templated; regulation of transcription by RNA polymerase II
Sources:Amigo / QuickGO
Orthologs
Databases	NCBI: entry; OMA: entry
Species	Human	Mouse
Entrez	7586	74570
Ensembl	ENSG00000106261	ENSMUSG00000029729
UniProt	P17029	Q8BGS3
RefSeq (mRNA)	NM_001287054; NM_001287055; NM_003439; NM_001346579; NM_001346580 NM_001346581	NM_029869; NM_133906
RefSeq (protein)	NP_001273983; NP_001273984; NP_001333508; NP_001333509; NP_001333510 NP_003430	NP_084145; NP_598667
Location (UCSC)	Chr 7: 100.02 – 100.04 Mb	Chr 5: 138.08 – 138.11 Mb
PubMed search
- Wikidata
View/Edit Human	View/Edit Mouse

Zinc finger protein with KRAB and SCAN domains 1 is a protein that in humans is encoded by the ZKSCAN1 gene.

== See also ==
- Chromosome 7 (human)
- Krüppel associated box (KRAB) domain
- Zinc finger protein
