= Humanitarian Information Centers =

Former service of the UN

A Humanitarian Information Centre (HIC) was a common service to the humanitarian community managed by the United Nations Office for the Coordination of Humanitarian Affairs (OCHA). HICs were operated in coordination with a number of partners which may include the United Nations Joint Logistics Centre (UNJLC), the Swedish Rescue Services Agency (SRSA), the European Community Humanitarian Office (ECHO), and the NGO MapAction.

According to the archived HICs website, the last time a HIC was set up was during the conflict in Myanmar. It remained operational between May and December 2008.

== Description ==
A HIC was usually set up in response to a major natural disaster or conflict-related humanitarian emergency. The HIC normally remained in operation for several months after the disaster event, until the recovery phase is well under way.

A HIC provided a shared resource (including a physical facility in the affected country) that allowed relief organisations to share information about the emergency. The HICs main functions were to assemble, analyse, and publish information from the humanitarian organisations working in that area, as "information products" such as contacts lists and situation maps.

The wider goals of the HIC system include helping the humanitarian community to improve the management of information, by making better use of basic "building blocks" such as place codes and links to mapping.

== Services provided by a HIC ==
The services provided by a HIC varied somewhat from emergency to emergency. However, typically a HIC provided a range of services and products including:

- orientation products (including contact lists and meeting schedules)
- map products (covering themes from administrative boundaries to security concerns)
- technical advice and information about data standards, to enable information to be shared effectively
- a physical space for information coordination, and sometimes an "internet cafe" for the user organisations
