= HIC1 =

Protein-coding gene in the species Homo sapiens

Identifiers
- Aliases: HIC1, ZBTB29, ZNF901, hic-1, hypermethylated in cancer 1, HIC ZBTB transcriptional repressor 1
- External IDs: OMIM: 603825; MGI: 1338010; GeneCards: HIC1

Gene location (Human)
Chr.	Chromosome 17 (human)
Band	17p13.3	Start	2,054,154 bp
Band	17p13.3	End	2,063,241 bp

Gene location (Mouse)
Chr.	Chromosome 11 (mouse)
Band	11 B5|11 45.76 cM	Start	75,055,391 bp
Band	11 B5|11 45.76 cM	End	75,060,345 bp
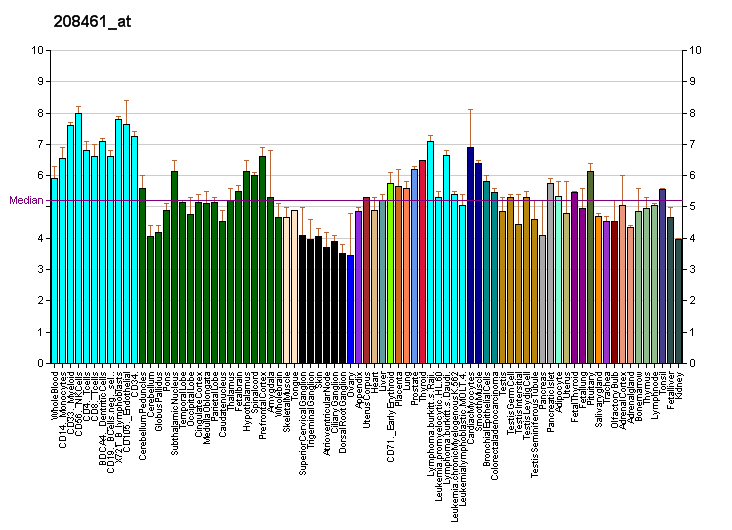
RNA expression pattern
Bgee	Human / Mouse (ortholog); Top expressed in: cardiac muscle tissue of right atrium; stromal cell of endometrium; apex of heart; sural nerve; vena cava; right ovary; left ovary; left uterine tube; body of uterus; pericardium / Top expressed in: internal carotid artery; external carotid artery; vas deferens; efferent ductule; Gonadal ridge; female urethra; dermis; placenta; gastrula; uterus; More reference expression data
BioGPS	More reference expression data
Gene ontology
Molecular function	DNA-binding transcription factor activity; sequence-specific DNA binding; DNA binding; histone deacetylase binding; protein binding; metal ion binding; nucleic acid binding; DNA-binding transcription repressor activity, RNA polymerase II-specific; DNA-binding transcription factor activity, RNA polymerase II-specific
Cellular component	chromatin; nucleus; cytosol; nucleoplasm
Biological process	multicellular organism development; negative regulation of Wnt signaling pathway; positive regulation of DNA damage response, signal transduction by p53 class mediator; regulation of transcription, DNA-templated; negative regulation of transcription by RNA polymerase II; Wnt signaling pathway; transcription, DNA-templated; intrinsic apoptotic signaling pathway in response to DNA damage; cellular response to DNA damage stimulus
Sources:Amigo / QuickGO
Orthologs
Databases	NCBI: entry; OMA: entry
Species	Human	Mouse
Entrez	3090	15248
Ensembl	ENSG00000177374	ENSMUSG00000043099
UniProt	Q14526	Q9R1Y5
RefSeq (mRNA)	NM_006497; NM_001098202	NM_001098203; NM_010430
RefSeq (protein)	NP_001091672; NP_006488	NP_001091673; NP_034560
Location (UCSC)	Chr 17: 2.05 – 2.06 Mb	Chr 11: 75.06 – 75.06 Mb
PubMed search
- Wikidata
View/Edit Human	View/Edit Mouse

Hypermethylated in cancer 1 protein is a protein that in humans is encoded by the HIC1 gene.
