= SIX4 =

Protein-coding gene in the species Homo sapiens

Identifiers
- Aliases: SIX4, AREC3, SIX homeobox 4
- External IDs: OMIM: 606342; MGI: 106034; GeneCards: SIX4

Gene location (Human)
Chr.	Chromosome 14 (human)
Band	14q23.1	Start	60,709,539 bp
Band	14q23.1	End	60,724,351 bp

Gene location (Mouse)
Chr.	Chromosome 12 (mouse)
Band	12|12 C3	Start	73,146,383 bp
Band	12|12 C3	End	73,160,230 bp
RNA expression pattern
Bgee	Human / Mouse (ortholog); Top expressed in: bronchial epithelial cell; vastus lateralis muscle; Skeletal muscle tissue of biceps brachii; Skeletal muscle tissue of rectus abdominis; deltoid muscle; nasal epithelium; mucosa of paranasal sinus; cartilage tissue; parotid gland; epithelium of nasopharynx / Top expressed in: lumbar spinal ganglion; intercostal muscle; maxillary prominence; parotid gland; utricle; foot; soleus muscle; digastric muscle; mandibular prominence; lobe of prostate; More reference expression data
BioGPS	n/a
Gene ontology
Molecular function	sequence-specific DNA binding; RNA polymerase II cis-regulatory region sequence-specific DNA binding; DNA-binding transcription factor activity; DNA binding; DNA-binding transcription activator activity, RNA polymerase II-specific; DNA-binding transcription factor activity, RNA polymerase II-specific; transcription cis-regulatory region binding
Cellular component	cytoplasm; nucleus; transcription regulator complex
Biological process	tongue development; trigeminal ganglion development; sarcomere organization; generation of neurons; regulation of branch elongation involved in ureteric bud branching; negative regulation of apoptotic process; positive regulation of branching involved in ureteric bud morphogenesis; transcription, DNA-templated; multicellular organism development; negative regulation of satellite cell differentiation; pharyngeal system development; anatomical structure morphogenesis; embryonic skeletal system morphogenesis; inner ear morphogenesis; myotome development; fungiform papilla morphogenesis; skeletal muscle fiber differentiation; positive regulation of ureteric bud formation; regulation of gene expression; embryonic cranial skeleton morphogenesis; anatomical structure development; regulation of synaptic assembly at neuromuscular junction; olfactory placode formation; myoblast migration; thymus development; positive regulation of transcription, DNA-templated; regulation of epithelial cell proliferation; metanephric mesenchyme development; male sex determination; skeletal muscle tissue development; negative regulation of neuron apoptotic process; regulation of protein localization; male sex differentiation; regulation of transcription, DNA-templated; positive regulation of transcription by RNA polymerase II; transcription by RNA polymerase II; male gonad development; negative regulation of transcription, DNA-templated; protein localization to nucleus
Sources:Amigo / QuickGO
Orthologs
Databases	NCBI: entry; OMA: entry
Species	Human	Mouse
Entrez	51804	20474
Ensembl	ENSG00000100625	ENSMUSG00000034460
UniProt	Q9UIU6	Q61321
RefSeq (mRNA)	NM_017420	NM_011382; NM_001362272
RefSeq (protein)	NP_059116	NP_035512; NP_001349201
Location (UCSC)	Chr 14: 60.71 – 60.72 Mb	Chr 12: 73.15 – 73.16 Mb
PubMed search
- Wikidata
View/Edit Human	View/Edit Mouse

Homeobox protein SIX4 is a protein that in humans is encoded by the SIX4 gene.
