= Avian brain =

Brain of birds

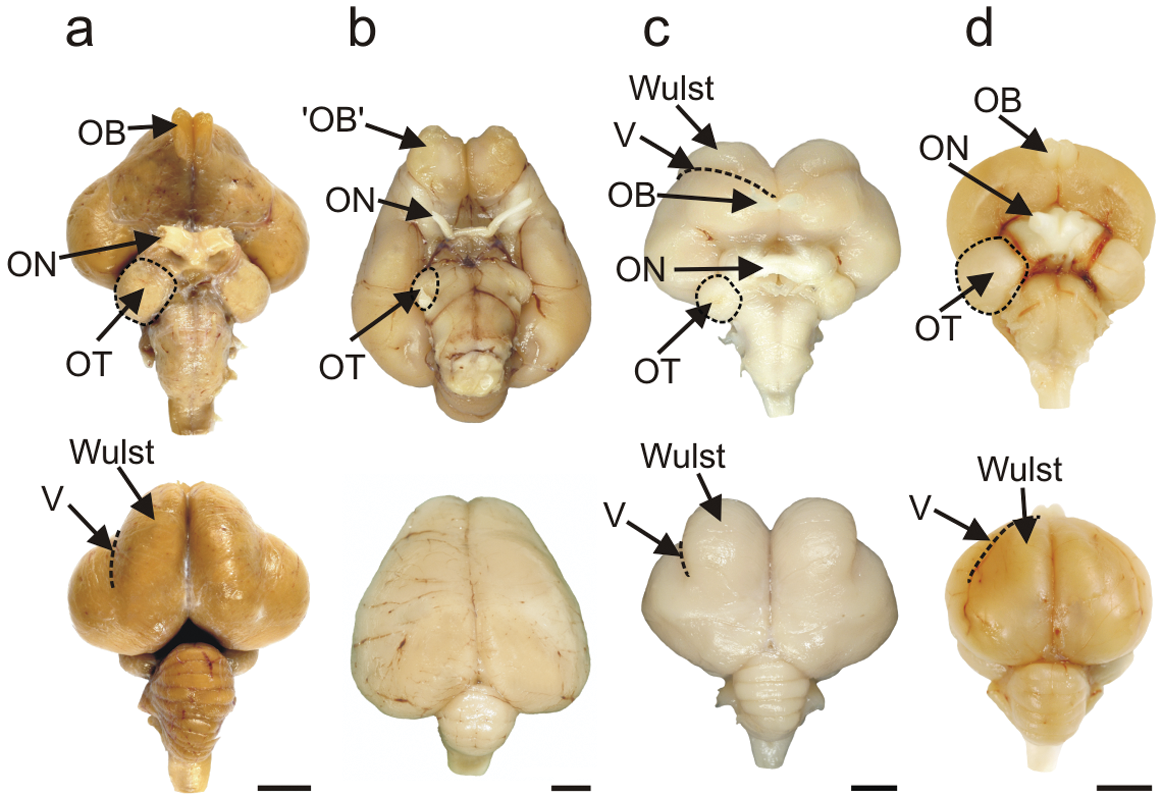
Brains of an emu, a kiwi, a barn owl, and a pigeon, with visual processing areas labelled

The avian brain is the central organ of the nervous system in birds. Birds possess large, complex brains, which process, integrate, and coordinate information received from the environment and make decisions on how to respond with the rest of the body. Like in all chordates, the avian brain is contained within the skull bones of the head.

The bird brain is divided into a number of sections, each with a different function. The cerebrum or telencephalon is divided into two hemispheres, and controls higher functions. The telencephalon is dominated by a large pallium, which corresponds to the mammalian cerebral cortex and is responsible for the cognitive functions of birds. The pallium is made up of several major structures: the hyperpallium, a dorsal bulge of the pallium found only in birds, as well as the nidopallium, mesopallium, and archipallium. The bird telencephalon has a nuclear structure, wherein neurons are distributed in three-dimensionally arranged clusters, with no large-scale separation of white matter and grey matter, though there exist layer-like and column-like connections. Structures in the pallium are associated with perception, learning, and cognition. Beneath the pallium are the two components of the subpallium, the striatum and pallidum. The subpallium connects different parts of the telencephalon and plays major roles in a number of critical behaviours. To the rear of the telencephalon are the thalamus, midbrain, and cerebellum. The hindbrain connects the rest of the brain to the spinal cord.

The size and structure of the avian brain enables prominent behaviours of birds such as flight and vocalization. Dedicated structures and pathways integrate the auditory and visual senses, strong in most species of birds, as well as the typically weaker olfactory and tactile senses. Social behaviour, widespread among birds, depends on the organisation and functions of the brain. Some birds exhibit strong abilities of cognition, enabled by the unique structure and physiology of the avian brain.

== Structure and function ==
=== Telencephalon ===
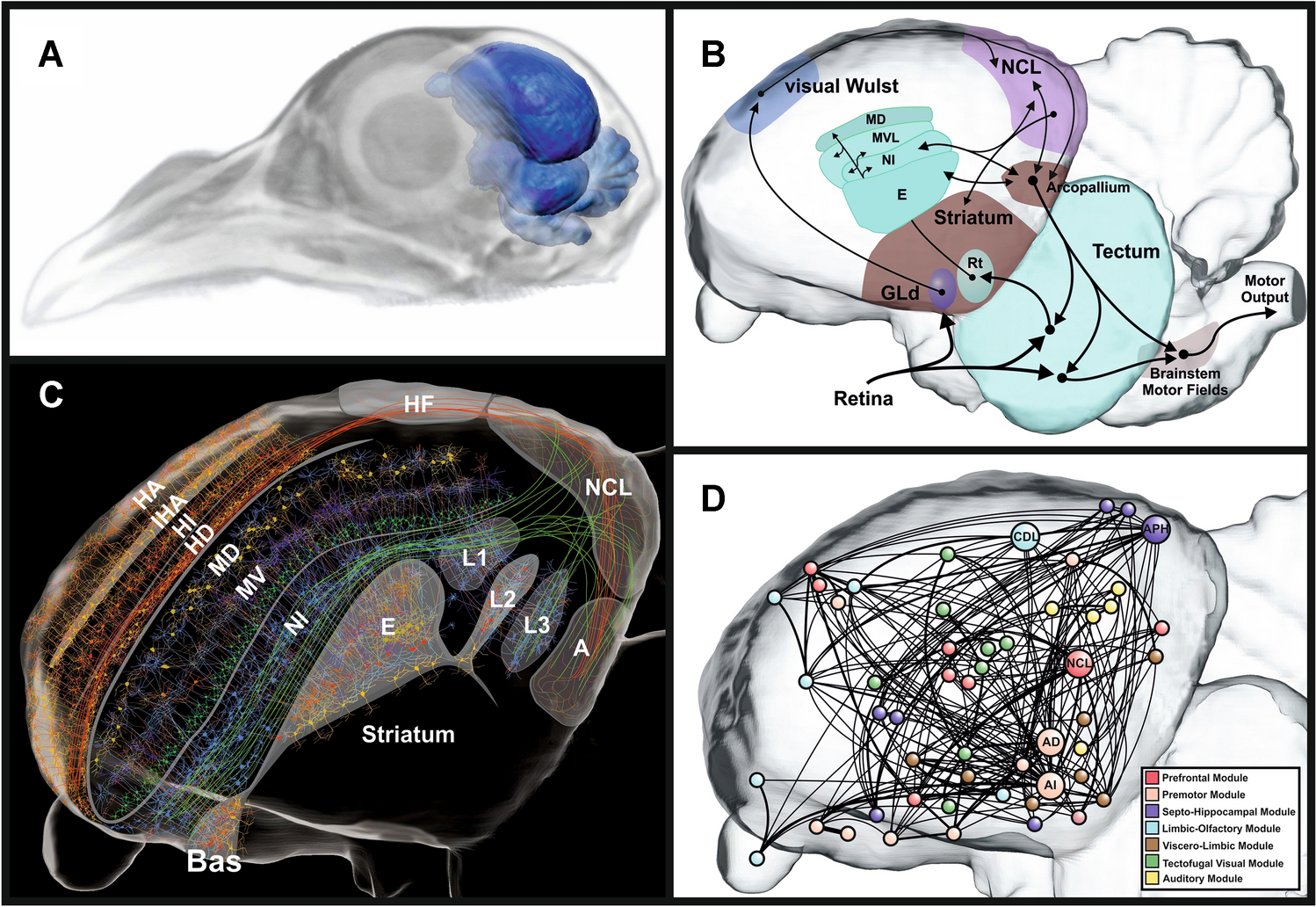
A: A view of the brain of a pigeon within the head. B: The pigeon's visual processing pathway. C:The sensory cortex of a pigeon. D: Connectosome view of the sensory cortex.

The telencephalon, or forebrain, is generally a large structure in birds. It is made up of three primary domains: the striatal domain, the pallidal domain, and the pallial domain.

==== Pallium ====
The pallial domain is divided into two main parts: the Wulst, or hyperpallium, at the dorsal surface of the pallium, and the dorso-ventricular ridge, which comprises the nidopallium, arcopallium, and archipallium. The circuitry of the avian brain is organised such that circuits for processes such as vision and cognition pass between the structures of the pallium, with connections both horizontally and vertically oriented within the pallium. In the sensory areas of the pallium, neurons display a layer-like organisation into columns, with horizontal connections; hence, the part of the pallium responsible for sensory circuitry is also called the sensory cortex in birds.

Within the pallium, the nidopallium caudolaterale (NCL) is thought to be a centre of goal-directed action. It is the part of the pallium that has the most innervation sensitive to dopamine, and has a structure suggesting strong dopamine control. Neural activity in the nidopallium caudolaterale is correlated with rewards, rules, categories, and information held in the memory. The nidopallium caudolaterale is also proportionally much larger in birds with stronger cognitive abilities. Showing diversity in bird brains and potentially the role of the nidopallium caudolaterale is that structure's separation into multiple structures in songbirds.

===== Lateralisation =====
The avian telencephalon, like its human counterpart, is organised into two distinct hemispheres. Functions such as song learning in songbirds, vision, auditory, and olfactory, and magnetic sensory systems are all lateralised, meaning that one hemisphere of the brain dominates a certain function. The left hemisphere of the brain dominates activities that demand the separation of important stimuli from distracting ones, while the right hemisphere is more easily distracted and has a broad attention. The right hemisphere also dominates fear and escape responses. In zebra finches (Taeniopygia guttata), the left hemisphere also is dominant in learning tasks. Birds can sense the orientation of magnetic fields, and use them to help navigate. The right hemisphere of the brain is dominant in the magnetic sense.

==== Subpallial telencephalon ====
The subpallial tenecephalon of birds, ventral to the pallium, contains neural systems with critical functions. It can be divided into the striatal domain and the pallidal domain, which are progenitor zones from which brain structures develop. The subpallial telencephalon is also grouped into several major functional systems. These are the dorsal somatomotor basal ganglia, the ventral viscerolimbic basal ganglia, subpallial extended amygdala, basal corticopetal system, and the septum. Additionally, the preoptic area is considered part of the subpallial telencephalon. Functional systems exist in both subpallial domains.

Research through the 1960s demonstrated that the basal ganglia of birds occupied only the ventromedial telencephalon and not the entire forebrain, a historically held belief. The basal ganglia include the dorsal somatomotor basal ganglia (DSBG), which possesses both a pallidal and a striatal component, and is made up of the medial striatum, lateral striatum, globus pallidus, and intrapeduncular nucleus. In songbirds, it also contains Area X, which is responsible for aspects of vocal function in songbirds. The DSBG has important functions in voluntary motor control. Pathways including the DSBG allow birds to effect movement when desired and to reject movement when undesired. The basal ganglia also include the ventral viscerolimbic basal ganglia (VVBG). The VVBG, like the DSBG, occupies portion of both the striatum and pallidum. It contains the ventral portion of the medial striatum, the nucleus accumbens, the olfactory tubercle, and the ventral pallidum. The VVBG functions as a "reward centre" as well as a facilitator of "action selection". In these roles, the VVBG is important in supporting reward-seeking behaviour and discouraging behaviour leading to negative stimulus.

Area X, unique to songbirds, is critical to learning song, which is a reproduction-critical behaviour in songbirds. It has been described by scientists as analogous to the mammalian striatum, due to a similar composition to that part of the brain. However, it also contains brain cells from the pallidum. Area X is activated most strongly when songbirds are learning new songs, and decline thereafter.

The extended amygdala is composed of the central extended amygdala and medial extended amygdala. The central extended amygdala is connected to behaviours involving ingestion, as well as stress, anxiety, and fear. The role and structure of the medial extended amygdala are debated by scientists. The medial extended amygdala receives inputs from the olfactory bulb, as well as the rest of the olfactory system, including the olfactory organs in the front of bird heads. It is related to sexual and social behaviours. Certain structures in the median extended amygdala have been demonstrated in birds to be sexually dimorphic. In chickens (Gallus gallus), research shows that part of the median extended amygdala plays a part in male sexual behaviour.

The basal corticopetal system in birds is made up of three nuclei: the basal magnocellular nucleus, and the horizontal and vertical limbs of the nuclei of the diagonal band. The role of the basal corticopetal system is poorly known in birds, although that system is known to be correlated to memory in mammals. However, it has been shown that damage to the basal corticopetal system impairs the memory of chicks (Gallus gallus).

Based on studies of a variety of passerine birds, the avian septum is divided into four main parts: the lateral septum, medial septum, septohippocampal septum, and caudocentral septum. The septum has functions related to stress, as well as responses to stimuli such as light. The preoptic area has functions related to sexual behaviour.

=== Brain stem and cerebellum ===
==== Cerebellum ====
The cerebellum is a relatively conservative part of the brain, with circuitry tending to be similar across different types of vertebrates. Like in mammals, the avian cerebellum is a strongly folded structure. Bird cerebella are typically divided into ten different groups of folds called lobuli. In some bird groups, the cerebellum is expanded to accommodate different requirements. For instance, in birds that perform much manipulation with the beak, like crows, woodpeckers, and parrots, there is an expansion of the visual part of the cerebellum. In contrast, the part of the cerebellum associated with the tail is expanded.

There is substantial variation in the foliation (folding) in the cerebella of birds, although all birds have at least some folding of the cerebellum. The folding of the cerebellum is also not strictly associated with the structure and size of the rest of the brain: penguins, seabirds, parrots, and crows, exhibit a similar degree of folding, despite very different brain characteristics. Likewise, owls, galliformes, and pigeons exhibit similar folding patterns. In general, the folding patterns of the cerebellum in birds reflect differences of behaviour, as well as variations in skull shape constraining cerebellar development and sensory and sensorimotor requirements of animals living disparate lifestyles.

== Physiology ==
=== Metabolism ===
Neurons are typically energy-intensive cells that have a high cost of maintenance, yet birds have high neuron densities and absolute numbers in their brains. Of the energy consumed by the brain, about 70-80% is used by neurons. The large numbers of neurons in the avian brain are enabled by relatively low specific energy demands. Experiments with pigeons have found the glucose demand of avian neurons to be more than 3 times less than that of mammals, whose neuron energy costs do not change between taxa. It is not yet known why avian brains require so much less glucose, but two contributing factors, neuron size and body temperature, have been posited by researchers. Although there has not been definitive study on the topic as of 2023, it is speculated that bird neurons are smaller than those of mammals, since bird brains have a much higher density of neurons per unit volume compared to similarly sized mammals. Smaller neurons can consume less energy, as their smaller surface area and volume contain fewer receptors, ion channels, and mitochondria, while possessing lower membrane capacitance, meaning membrane potential requires less energy to change. A smaller neuron also requires less energy for upkeep. Additionally, the higher temperatures of bird brains, reaching 42 °C (108 °F) in pigeons, also facilitate lower energy consumption. Higher temperatures reduce the time it takes to activate and deactivate ion channels, which reduces energy needs.

== Evolution ==
The avian brain today differs markedly from those of mammals, from which the bird lineage diverged in the Permian, and from all other reptiles, from which birds diverged in the Triassic.

The nidopallium caudolaterale of the avian brain, responsible for goal-directed action, has been found in crocodylians, the closest living relatives of birds, separated evolutionarily by 245 million years. Though this could represent an example of convergent evolution between crocodylians and birds, scientists believe it is more likely that the last common ancestor of birds and crocodiles possessed a nidopallium caudolaterale.

=== In the Jurassic and Cretaceous ===
Birds evolved from the non-avian dinosaurs, and the dinosaurean lineage leading up to birds shows substantial enlargement and reshaping of the brain. Endocasts of dinosaur braincases allow scientists to examine the relationship between brain size and body size in extinct species. In particular, brain sizes underwent several significant enlargements from the first theropod dinosaurs to modern birds. The brain sizes and shapes of most dinosaurs are similar to those of modern reptiles. However, in Coelurosauria, a group of dinosaurs containing (among other taxa) tyrannosauroids and birds, the brain is at least twice as large as other dinosaurs of similar body size. A group of coelurosaurs, the Maniraptoriformes, a group containing birds as well as ornithomimosaurs, possesses brains again twice as large as those of other coelurosaurs. Brain size increases again in the Maniraptora, a group containing birds and oviraptorosaurs. Additionally, the shape of the brain acquired in Maniraptora, with a large cerebellum and optic lobe lateral to the telencephalon, is found in Ichthyornis, a bird that lived 70 million years ago and closely related to modern birds. The understanding of the evolution of brain size in modern birds is complicated by the limited sample of stem-bird brain endocasts. Several Mesozoic avialans have brain endocasts: Archaeopteryx, which is not always classified as an avialan (closer to modern birds than to Dromaeosaurus), Navaornis, an enantiornithean from the late Cretaceous, Cerebavis, an incomplete specimen which lacks a hyperpallium and whose classification is unclear, Ichthyornis, and MPM-334-1, a basicranium that belonged to an eighty-million-year old enantiornithine bird, preserving the hindbrain.

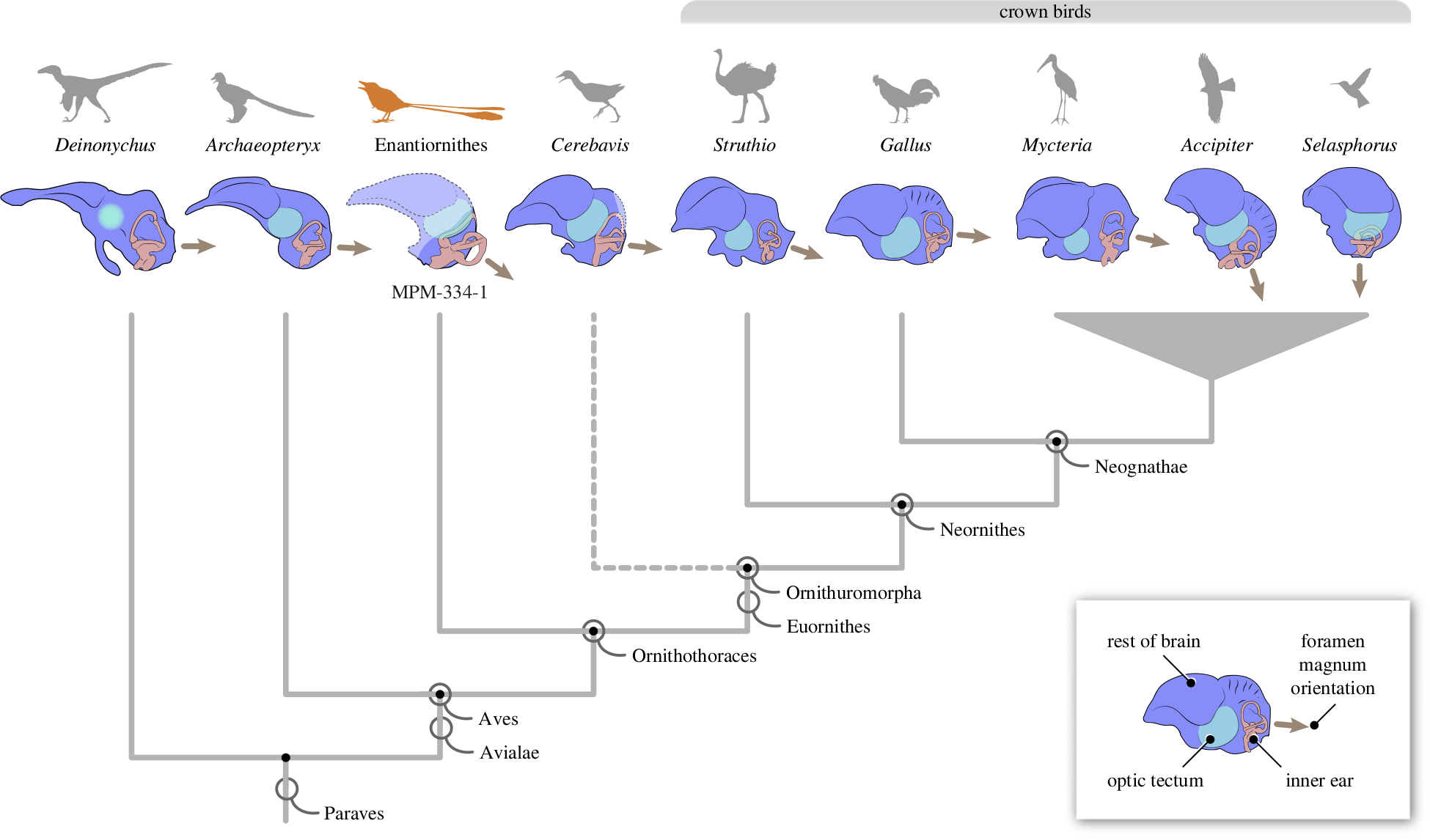
Bird brain shapes from Deinonychus to modern crown birds

Archaeopteryx is traditionally considered the first bird, and is sometimes referred to as the Urvogel (original bird). Despite possessing a brain almost certainly adapted for flight, the telencephalon of Archaeopteryx was not particularly large compared to related dinosaurs. Indeed, several oviraptorosaurs, as well as the troodontine Zanabazar and the jinfengopterygine troodontid IGM100/1126, possess brains larger relative to their body size than Archaeopteryx. Other elements of the cranial anatomy of Archaeopteryx are likewise similar to those of other maniraptoran dinosaurs, suggesting that those animals may also have had the requisite neurological facilities for flight.

The Enantiornithes, which dominated the Cretaceous avifauna and were the first large radiation of birds, exhibited brains anatomically intermediate between those of Archaeopteryx and modern birds. As seen in brain endocasts of Navaornis, the telencephalon is expanded mediolaterally compared to in Archaeopteryx and non-avialan pennaraptorans, but not to the same degree as in modern birds, and the cerebellum is relatively small. However, it also shared traits like large optic lobes situated beneath the telencephalon and an inner ear canal modern in form with modern birds.

The Wulst, the physically projecting hyperpallium, is of interest in bird brain evolution because it is not present in any other living reptiles other than birds. Moreover, it is thought to be analogous to the neocortex in mammals, with an important role in higher cognition. No non-avialan dinosaurs possess a Wulst, and indeed neither does Archaeopteryx, a primitive bird. However, the ornithuran Ichthyornis, despite having a brain shape resembling primitive maniraptorans, possesses a Wulst, showing that the structure likely originated earlier in bird evolution and exists outside of modern birds.

In general, the brain-to-body ratio of dinosaurs doubled from basal Theropoda to Coelurosauria and again doubled from Coelurosauria to Maniraptoriformes. From Maniraptoriformes, the general form of the brain took upon a form that would be retained at least in Ichthyornis, close to modern birds. Three major grade shifts in brain-to-body ratio are inferred by scientists to have taken place in the evolution of birds from basal Paraves to the base of crown Neoaves.

=== In the Cenozoic ===
There is substantial diversity in the size and arrangement of the brain in modern birds. During the Paleogene, the average brain size in birds relative to the body tended to increase; in many of the lineages emerging from the Paleogene avian radiation, brain size tended to scale more quickly than body size. Scientists hypothesise that this growth in brain size occurred as a result of the adaptive radiation birds experienced at the K-Pg transition, and that the larger brains of crown birds allowed them to adapt to an unstable environment.

The tremendous diversity of modern birds leads to a diverse range of patterns for the brain. In the clade Neoaves, comprising all birds save fowl and paleognaths, the brain-to-body ratio increases, but this is driven primarily by a decrease in average body size. This pattern is observed in swifts, hummingbirds, sandpipers, buttonquails, as well as in the line leading up to Telluraves, the "higher landbirds". However, many groups of waterbirds, collectively known as the Aequornithes, do not follow this trend, rather tending to increase body size and brain size at an equal rate. The basalmost Telluraves are two branches of large, predatory birds. One, in Afroaves, is made up of the owls, which have large brains evolved for visual acuity, and the Accipitriformes, including hawks and eagles. The other, in Australaves, includes the falcons, seriemas, and the extinct terror birds. Within Afroaves, there are successive shifts towards higher brain-to-body ratios. The mousebirds and rollers in Coraciimorphae have greater brain-to-body ratios than Afroaves, and the woodpeckers nested within Coraciimorphae have yet larger ratios still.

Some of the largest brain-to-body ratios in birds, especially of the telencephalon, that part of the brain responsible for cognition, are found in the Psittaciformes (parrots) and Corvidae (crows, ravens, jays, magpies, and allies), both members of the Australaves. Indeed, the parrots and corvids are unique among birds for their large brain sizes. Moreover, scientists believe that their increased brain-body ratios evolved the most rapidly of any brain-body ratio shift in birds.

In contrast to what is currently thought to be relatively few grade changes in the brain-to-body ratio of birds in the Mesozoic, researchers have found that nine such shifts took place in the Paleocene, possibly as a response to the K-Pg extinction event. Moreover, they find that the largest brain sizes in birds evolved only recently, with the Neogene radiation of crown corvids and crown parrots. Moreover, in these lineages, the density of neurons in the brain also increases, contributing to significant cognitive complexity.

== Comparison to mammal brains ==
The brains of birds are often compared to those of mammals. The earliest neuroscientists to extensively study birds, such as Ludwig Edinger, were struck by the differences they observed between bird brains and mammals. Today, the relationships between homologous structures in avian and mammalian brains are better known; additionally, many convergent features of bird and mammal brains have been observed. Some of the similarities between bird and mammal brains include the processing of specialised sensory input, involvement in higher cognition, high neuron density, and the fibre structure of the brain. Moreover, avian brains show evidence for sensory consciousness. Many of the structures thought to contribute to mammal intelligence, such as the six-layered neocortex, are absent in birds. Despite this, birds such as corvids and parrots display intellectual behaviour that are comparable to those of highly intelligent mammals like the great apes. Scientists believe that this is an example of convergent evolution, wherein radically different gross structures evolved towards connectional similarities that produced comparable results.

=== Striation of the pallium ===
In mammals, the neocortex, strongly associated with higher thought and cognition, is laminated and consists of 6 layers. In birds, there is no comparable lamination in most of the pallium, which corresponds to the cerebral cortex. However, the hyperpallium of the dorsal telencephalon does indeed possess some layering: either three or four strata, depending on the size of the hyperpallium of the bird in question. In both the mammalian neocortex and the avian hyperpallium, the layers have distinct connection types and neurochemical composition.

=== Analogues to the prefrontal cortex ===
The prefrontal cortex of mammals, which is highly involved in the processes that support complex learning, may have an analogue in birds in the form of the nidopallium caudolaterale. Researchers have found that there are similarities between the ways neurons in the caudolateral nidopallium activate in response to certain tests designed for the prefrontal cortex similarly to how neurons in the prefrontal cortex themselves behave. Damage to the caudolateral nidopallium also causes deficiencies in this class of task. However, the role of the caudolateral nidopallium is still not clear, and it has been tested only in pigeons, which possess relatively small brains. The role of the caudolateral nidopallium in more complex goal-oriented action is thus uncertain.

== History ==
The scientific study of the avian brain accelerated in the 19th century as new techniques for the preparation of vertebrate brains became more refined. At the turn of the 20th century, the German neurologist Ludwig Edinger devised a theory of vertebrate cerebral evolution that soon became the dominant scientific view. The Dutch neurologist C.U. Ariëns-Kappers then refined the model, adapting it to the avian brain. Following a linear model of evolution, Ariëns-Kappers promoted the idea that brain structures were gained in sequence in evolutionary lineages, called an accretionary theory. According to his theory, birds and mammals inherited a primitive basal ganglia from fish and amphibians known as the palaeostriatum. They also inherited a newer basal ganglia from the reptiles known as the neostriatum. Reptiles were supposed to have evolved the neostriatum into two different structures, which were then passed on to birds. Ariëns-Kappers also posited that the topmost layer of the avian brain was formed of striatal brain cells, comprising a mass which he dubbed the hyperstriatum. Therefore, for many years, the avian telencephalon was thought to consist almost entirely of a large basal ganglia. The first stereotaxic atlas of the avian brain, in 1967, followed the Ariëns-Kappers view of the avian brain and further entrenched the incorrect concept of a "primitive" avian brain.

For years, too, scientists assumed that birds were not capable of advanced thought, as their brains were perceived to be devoid of complex pallial structures. Moreover, they lacked striated structures such as those found in the mammalian cerebral cortex, which were thought to be responsible for complex cognition. In fact, neurologists believed that birds were creatures that acted on instinct rather than on any sort of thought, and that they were highly unintelligent. From this conception arose the term colloquial term bird-brain, used to denigrate persons as unintelligent.

Research into bird cognition, behaviour, and anatomy, as well as into the brain, specifically, it became apparent that the traditional accretionary view of vertebrate telencephalic evolution was incorrect. It was also becoming clear that what were then referred to as striatal parts of the brain were really pallial in origin. In the late 1990s and early 2000s, a movement began, culminating in 2002, resulting in a new nomenclature for the avian brain that has since become standard. New research into bird neural networks resulted in a better understanding of the structure and organisation of the avian brain.

== See also ==
- Bird intelligence
- Brain
- Bird vision
- Bird anatomy
- Encephalization quotient
