= Birdbrain =

Birdbrain or bird brain commonly refers to:

- Avian brain, the brain of a bird
- Bird intelligence, intelligence and its measurement as it applies to birds
- Stupid person, metaphorically, a person lacking intelligence, understanding, reason, wit, or sense

Birdbrain or bird brain may also refer to:

== Music ==
- Birdbrain (album), a 1999 album by Buffalo Tom
- Bird-Brains, a 2009 album by Tune-Yards
- Bird Brain, a 2009 album by Detroit techno artist Claude VonStroke
- Birdbrain (band), a Boston grunge band active 1992–1997
- "Bird Brain", a 2017 song and a member of the Orange County comedy punk band The Radioactive Chicken Heads (since 1997)
- "BIRDBRAIN", a 2025 song by Jamie Paige and OK Glass using the Kasane Teto voice synthesizer voicebank
- "Keep Me Going (Birdbrain)", a 2026 song by American rapper Slayr.

== Fiction ==
- Bird-Brain (Marvel Comics), a fictional character in Marvel Comics first introduced in 1987
- Birdbrain (novel), a 2010 English translation of Linnunaivot by Johanna Sinisalo

== Other uses ==
- Bird Brain, an animal act made in the 1970s by Marian Breland Bailey and Bob Bailey
