= Avian pallium =

Dorsal telencephalon of a bird's brain

In the neuroanatomy of animals, an avian pallium is the dorsal telencephalon of a bird's brain. The subpallium is the ventral telencephalon.

The pallium of avian species tends to be relatively large, comprising ~75% of the telencephalic volume. Evidence suggests the avian pallium's neuroarchitecture to be reminiscent of the mammalian cerebral cortex. The avian pallium has also been suggested to be an equivalent neural basis for consciousness. Birds also have a unique pallial structure known as the hyperpallium, once called the hyperstriatum.

A 2002 conference at Duke University (Avian Brain Nomenclature Consortium) established a standard nomenclature for describing the avian pallium as follows:

- Pallium
  - Pyriform cortex
  - Olfactory bulb
  - Hippocampus
  - Corticoid area
  - Hyperpallium
    - Apicale
    - Intercalatum
    - Densocellulare
  - Mesopallium
    - Dorsale
    - Ventrale
  - Nidopallium
    - Field L2
    - Entopallium
    - Basorostralis
  - Arcopallium
  - Amygdaloid complex
    - Posterior amygdala
    - Nucleus taeniae
- Subpallium
  - Striatum
    - Lateral
    - Medial
  - Pallidum
    - Globus pallidus or dorsal pallidum
    - Ventral pallidum

== Notable researchers ==
- Stanley Cobb
- Onur Güntürkün
- Andrew Iwaniuk

== See also ==
- Bird intelligence
- Animal intelligence
- Avian brain
