= Onur Güntürkün =

Turkish-German psychologist

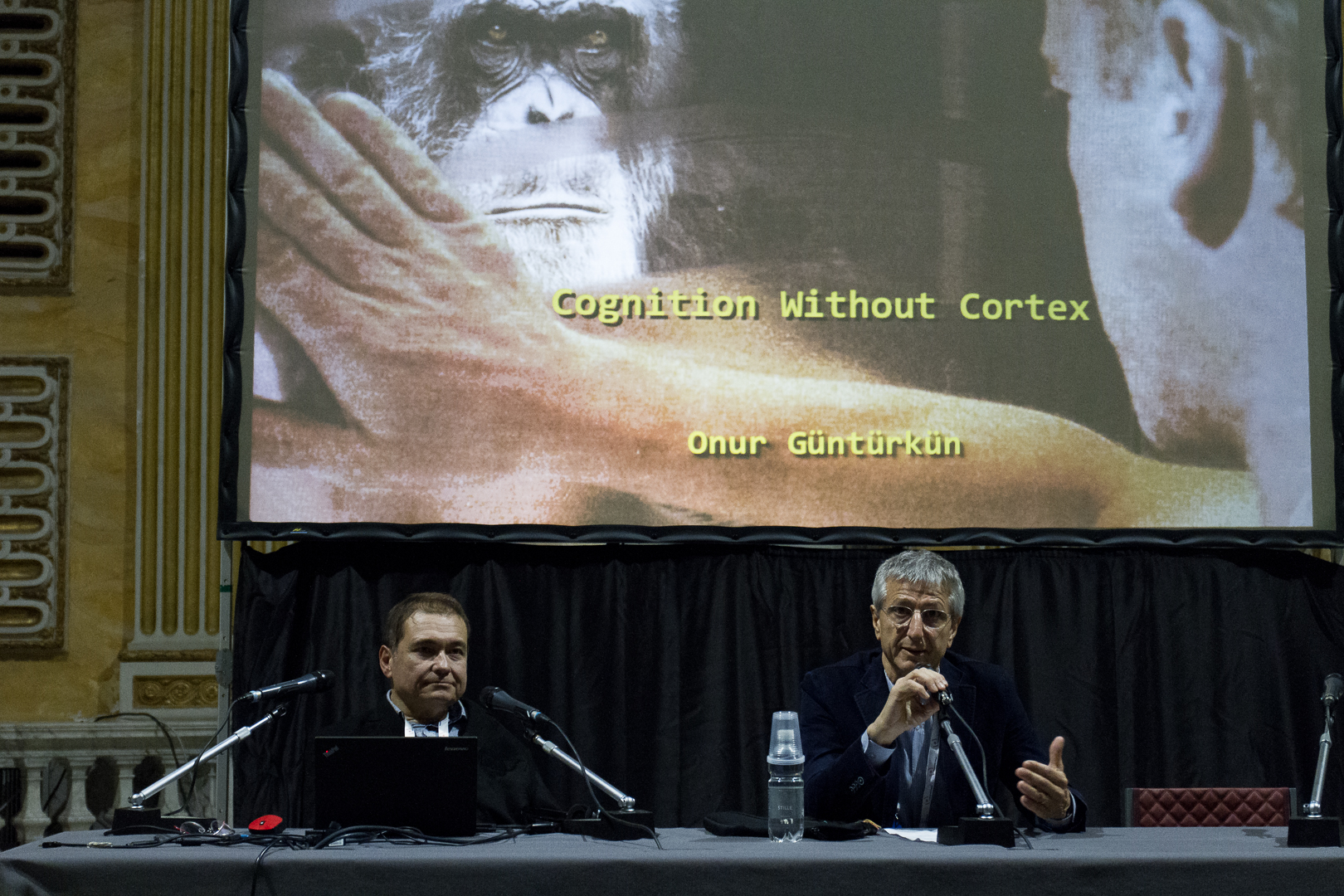
Onur Güntürkün, in a session on "cognition without cortex" at the Festival della Scienza 2017

Onur Güntürkün (born 18 July 1958, in İzmir) is a Turkish-German neuroscientist. He is professor of behavioral neuroscience at Ruhr University Bochum. Güntürkün studied psychology at the Ruhr University Bochum from 1975 to 1980 and received his PhD in 1984.

== Awards ==
- Gottfried Wilhelm Leibniz Prize (2013)

== See also ==
- Bird intelligence
- Avian pallium
