= Cerebavis =

Cerebavis Temporal range: Late Cretaceous, Cenomanian

Scientific classification
- Kingdom: Animalia
- Phylum: Chordata
- Class: Reptilia
- Clade: Dinosauria
- Clade: Saurischia
- Clade: Theropoda
- Clade: Avialae
- Clade: Ornithurae
- Genus: †Cerebavis; Kurochkin et al., 2006
- Species: †C. cenomanica

Binomial name
- †Cerebavis cenomanica Kurochkin et al., 2006

Extinct genus of dinosaurs

Cerebavis (from Latin cerebrum, "brain", and avis, "bird") is an extinct genus of ornithuran dinosaurs that lived during the middle Cenomanian of the Late Cretaceous period, and is known from a single partial skull (PIN 5028/2) found in the Melovatskaya Formation of Volgograd Region in Russia. The skull was initially described as the fossilised brain of an enantiornithean by Russian palaeornithologist Evgeny Kurochkin and colleagues in 2006. Kurochkin and colleagues described Cerebavis as having a notable mixture of ancestral traits, such as a well-developed olfactory system, with derived traits of modern birds like a large cerebrum. At the same time, they identified various unusual and unique features not seen in the brains of reptiles or birds. These include well-developed auditory tubercles on the midbrain, as well as a prominent parietal organ compared to living birds or Archaeopteryx between them.

In 2011 the fossil was reinterpreted as an incomplete and heavily abraded skull rather than a fossilised brain, and regarded Cerebavis as a probable non-enantiornithean bird and potentially a nomen dubium. In 2015, a detailed reappraisal of the specimen by the same authors concluded that it belonged to an ornithurine instead of an enantiornithean and revised its diagnosis. Cerebavis was reidentified as an ornithurine as it seemingly lacked a postorbital bone and consequently a temporal bar dividing the temporal fenestra, as well as the thinness of the skull roof and the high degree of fusion between the bones of the skull. Despite not preserving the brain itself as was originally thought, the surface of the skull closely corresponded to the shape of the brain and its endocast (the internal shape of the braincase) was described. The brain more closely resembles that of living birds than originally interpreted by Kurochkin and colleagues, lacking a large pineal gland and with olfactory bulbs of expected size compared to living birds. Notably though, despite its advanced size and shape Cerebavis seemingly lacked a wulst, a structure found in the brains of modern birds, suggesting its brain was not fully modern.
