= Bird intelligence =

Study of intelligence in birds

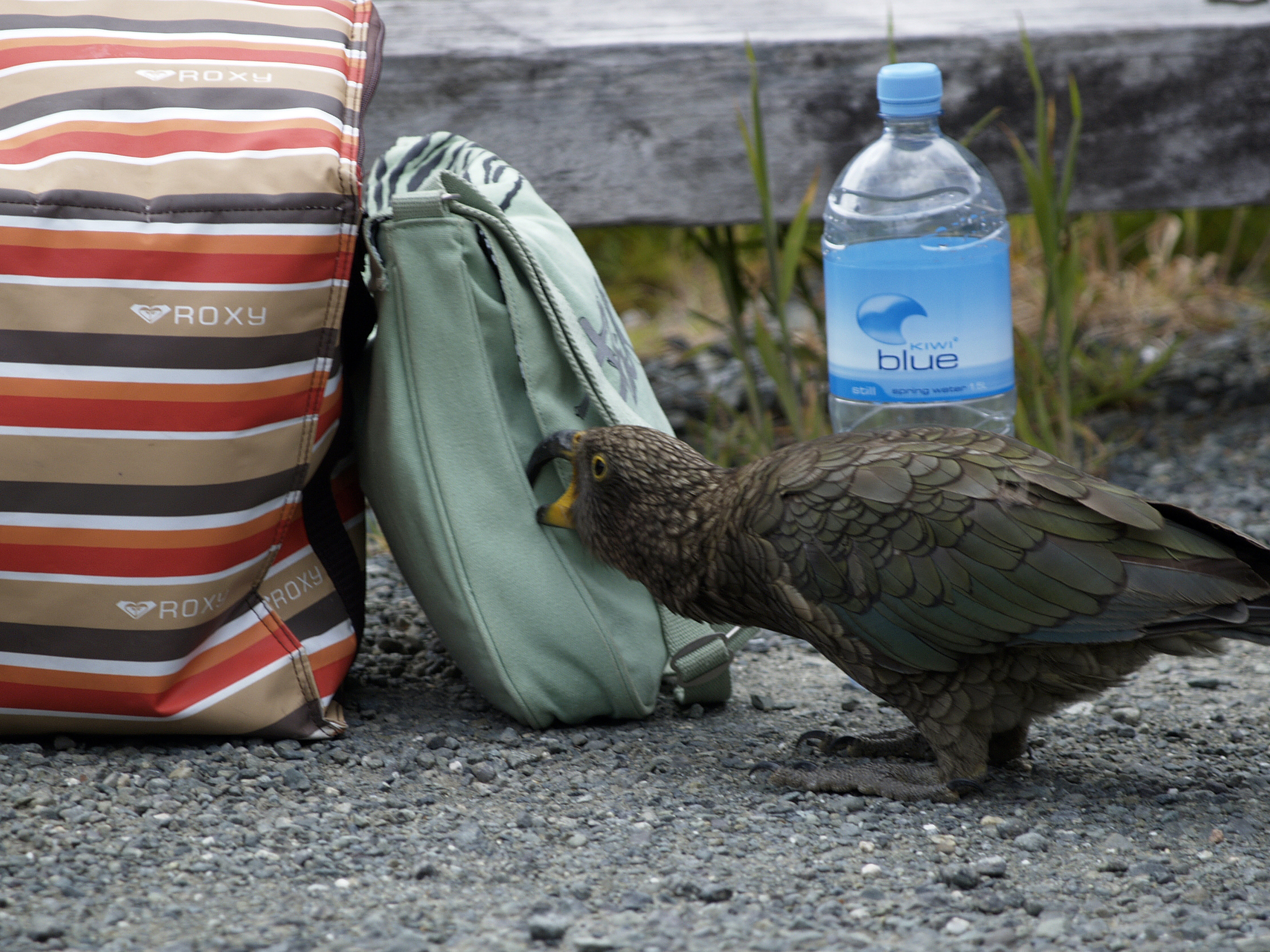
Kea (Nestor notabilis) in New Zealand are known for their intelligence and curiosity, both vital traits for survival in the harsh mountain environment that is their home. Kea can solve logical puzzles, such as pushing and pulling things in a certain order to get to food, and will work together to achieve a certain objective.

The difficulty of defining or measuring intelligence in non-human animals makes the question of avian intelligence resistant to scientific study. In general, birds have relatively large brains compared to their head size. Furthermore, bird brains have two to four times the neuron packing density of mammal brains, for higher overall efficiency. The visual and auditory senses are well developed in most species, though the tactile and olfactory senses are well realised only in a few groups. Birds communicate using visual signals as well as through the use of calls and song. The testing of intelligence in birds is therefore usually based on studying responses to sensory stimuli.

Corvids (including ravens, crows, nutcrackers, magpies, and jays) and parrots are often considered the most intelligent birds, and are among the most intelligent animals in general. Columbids (pigeons and doves), starlings (including mynas), finches, chickens, waterfowl such as ducks, penguins, sea birds such as auks (including puffins), albatrosses, pelicans and gulls, cardinals, thrushes (including robins), waxwings, toucans, ratites (ostriches, emus and kiwis), woodpeckers, hummingbirds, Artamids such as Australian magpies, and birds of prey such as eagles, hawks, and owls have also been regarded for their skills and have been subjects of studies.

== Studies ==
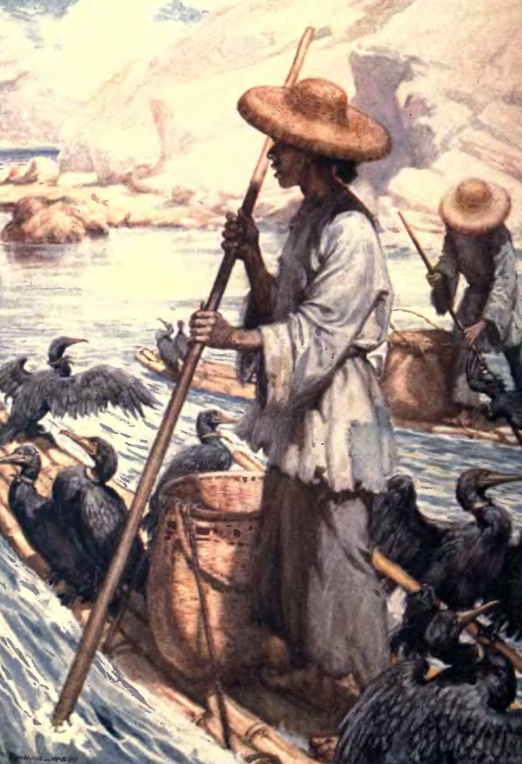
Cormorants used by fishermen in Southeast Asia may be able to count

Bird intelligence has been studied through several attributes and abilities. Many of these studies have been on birds such as quail, domestic fowl, and pigeons kept under captive conditions. It has, however, been noted that field studies have been limited, unlike those of the apes. Birds in the crow family (corvids) as well as parrots (psittacines) have been shown to live socially, have long developmental periods, and possess large forebrains, all of which have been hypothesised to allow for greater cognitive abilities.

Counting has traditionally been considered an ability that shows intelligence. Anecdotal evidence from the 1960s has suggested that crows can count up to 3. Researchers need to be cautious, however, and ensure that birds are not merely demonstrating the ability to subitise, or count a small number of items quickly. Some studies have suggested that crows may indeed have a true numerical ability. It has been shown that parrots can count up to 6.

Cormorants used by Chinese fishermen were given every eighth fish as a reward, and found to be able to keep count up to 7. E.H. Hoh wrote in Natural History magazine:

In the 1970s, on the Li River, Pamela Egremont observed fishermen who allowed the birds to eat every eighth fish they caught. Writing in the Biological Journal of the Linnean Society, she reported that, once their quota of seven fish was filled, the birds "stubbornly refuse to move again until their neck ring is loosened. They ignore an order to dive and even resist a rough push or a knock, sitting glum and motionless on their perches". Meanwhile, other birds that had not filled their quotas continued to catch fish as usual. "One is forced to conclude that these highly intelligent birds can count up to seven", she wrote.

Many birds are also able to detect changes in the number of eggs in their nest and brood. Parasitic cuckoos are often known to remove one of the host eggs before laying their own.

=== Associative learning ===
Visual or auditory signals and their association with food and other rewards have been well studied, and birds have been trained to recognise and distinguish complex shapes. This may be an important ability which aids their survival.

Associative learning is a method often used on animals to assess cognitive abilities. Bebus et al. define associative learning as "acquiring knowledge of a predictive or causal relationship (association) between two stimuli, responses or events". A classic example of associative learning is Pavlovian conditioning. In avian research, performance on simple associative learning tasks can be used to assess how cognitive abilities vary with experimental measures.

==== Associative learning vs. reversal learning ====
Bebus et al. demonstrated that associative learning in Florida scrub-jays correlated with reversal learning, personality, and baseline hormone levels. To measure associative learning abilities, they associated coloured rings to food rewards. To test reversal learning, the researchers simply reversed the rewarding and non-rewarding colours to see how quickly the scrub-jays would adapt to the new association. Their results suggest that associative learning is negatively correlated to reversal learning. In other words, birds that learned the first association quickly were slower to learn the new association upon reversal. The authors conclude that there must be a trade-off between learning an association and adapting to a new association.

==== Neophobia ====
Bebus et al. also showed that reversal learning was correlated with neophobia: birds that were afraid of a novel environment previously set up by the researchers were faster at reversal learning. The inverse correlation, where less neophobic birds performed better on the associative learning task, was measured but was not statistically significant. Opposite results were found by Guido et al., who showed that neophobia in Milvago chimango, a bird of prey native to South America, negatively correlated to reversal learning. In other words, neophobic birds were slower at reversal learning. The researchers suggested a modern explanation for this discrepancy: since birds living near urban areas benefit from being less neophobic to feed on human resources (such as detritus), but also benefit from being flexible learners (since human activity fluctuates), perhaps low neophobia coevolved with high reversal learning ability. Therefore, personality alone might be insufficient to predict associative learning due to contextual differences.

==== Hormones ====
Bebus et al. found a correlation between baseline hormone levels and associative learning. According to their study, low baseline levels of corticosterone (CORT), a hormone involved in stress response, predicted better associative learning. In contrast, high baseline levels of CORT predicted better reversal learning. In summary, Bebus et al. found that low neophobia (not statistically significant) and low baseline CORT levels predicted better associative learning abilities. Inversely, high neophobia and high baseline CORT levels predicted better reversal learning abilities.

==== Diet ====
In addition to reversal learning, personality, and hormone levels, further research suggests that diet may also correlate with associative learning performance. Bonaparte et al. demonstrated that high-protein diets in zebra finches correlated with better associative learning. The researchers showed that high-diet treatment was associated with larger head width, tarsus length, and body mass in the treated males. In subsequent testing, researchers showed that high-diet and larger head-to-tarsus ratio correlated with better performance on an associative learning task. The researchers used associative learning as a correlate of cognition to support that nutritional stress during development can negatively impact cognitive development which in turn may reduce reproductive success. One such way that poor diet may affect reproductive success is through song learning. According to the developmental stress hypothesis, zebra finches learn songs during a stressful period of development and their ability to learn complex songs reflects their adequate development.

Contradicting results by Kriengwatana et al. found that low food diet in zebra finches prior to nutritional independence (that is, before the birds are able to feed themselves) enhanced spatial associative learning, impaired memory, and had no effect on neophobia. They also failed to find a correlation between physiological growth and associative learning. Though Bonaparte et al. focused on protein content whereas Kriengwatana et al. focused on quantity of food, the results seem contradictory. Further research should be conducted to clarify the relationship between diet and associative learning.

==== Ecology ====
Associative learning may vary across species depending on their ecology. According to Clayton and Krebs, there are differences in associative learning and memory between food-storing and non-storing birds. In their experiment, food-storing jays and marsh tits and non-storing jackdaws and blue tits were introduced to seven sites, one of which contained a food reward. For the first phase of the experiment, the bird randomly searched for the reward between the seven sites, until it found it and was allowed to partially consume the food item. All species performed equally well in this first task. For the second phase of the experiment, the sites were hidden again and the birds had to return to the previously rewarding site to obtain the remainder of the food item. The researchers found that food-storing birds performed better in phase two than non-storing birds. While food-storing birds preferentially returned to the rewarding sites, non-storing birds preferentially returned to previously visited sites, regardless of the presence of a reward. If the food reward was visible in phase one, there was no difference in performance between storers and non-storers. These results show that memory following associative learning, as opposed to just learning itself, can vary with ecological lifestyle.

==== Age ====
Associative learning correlates with age in Australian magpies according to Mirville et al. In their study, the researchers initially wanted to study the effect of group size on learning. However, they found that group size correlated with the likelihood of interaction with the task, but not with associative learning itself. Instead, they found that age played a role on performance: adults were more successful at completing the associative learning task, but less likely to approach the task initially. Inversely, juveniles were less successful at completing the task, but more likely to approach it. Therefore, adults in larger groups were the most likely individuals to complete the task due to their increased likelihood to both approach and succeed on the task.

==== Weight ====
Though it may seem universally beneficial to be a fast learner, Madden et al. suggested that the weight of individuals affected whether or not associative learning was adaptive. The researchers studied common pheasants and showed that heavy birds that performed well on associative tasks had an increased probability of survival to four months old after being released into the wild, whereas light birds that performed well on associative tasks were less likely to survive. The researchers provide two explanations for the effect of weight on the results: perhaps larger individuals are more dominant and benefit from novel resources more than smaller individuals or they simply have a higher survival rate compared to smaller individuals due to bigger food reserves, difficulty for predators to kill them, increased motility, etc. Alternatively, ecological pressures may affect smaller individuals differently. Associative learning might be more costly on smaller individuals, thus reducing their fitness and leading to maladaptive behaviour.

Additionally, Madden et al. found that slow reversal learning in both groups correlated with low survival rate. The researchers suggested a trade-off hypothesis where the cost of reversal learning would inhibit the development of other cognitive abilities. According to Bebus et al., there is a negative correlation between associative learning and reversal learning. Perhaps low reversal learning correlates to better survival due to enhanced associative learning. Madden et al. also suggested this hypothesis but note their scepticism since they could not show the same negative correlation between associative and reversal learning found by Bebus et al.

==== Neural representations ====
In their research, Veit et al. show that associative learning modified NCL (nidopallium caudolaterale) neuronal activity in crows. To test this, visual cues were presented on a screen for 600ms, followed by a 1000ms delay. After the delay, a red stimulus and a blue stimulus were presented simultaneously and the crows had to choose the correct one. Choosing the correct stimulus was rewarded with a food item. As the crows learned the associations through trial and error, NCL neurons showed increased selective activity for the rewarding stimulus. In other words, a given NCL neuron that fired when the correct stimulus was the red one increased its firing rate selectively when the crow had to choose the red stimulus. This increased firing was observed during the delay period during which the crow was presumably thinking about which stimulus to choose. Additionally, increased NCL activity reflected the crow's increased performance. The researchers suggest that NCL neurons are involved in learning associations as well as making the subsequent behavioural choice for the rewarding stimulus.

==== Olfactory associative learning ====
Though most research is concerned with visual associative learning, Slater and Hauber showed that birds of prey are also able to learn associations using olfactory cues. In their study, nine individuals from five species of birds of prey learned to pair a neutral olfactory cue to a food reward.

=== Spatial and temporal abilities ===
A common test of intelligence is the detour test, where a glass barrier between the bird and an item such as food is used in the setup. Most mammals discover that the objective is reached by first going away from the target. Whereas domestic fowl fail on this test, many within the crow family are readily able to solve the problem.

Large fruit-eating birds in tropical forests depend on trees which bear fruit at different times of the year. Many species, such as pigeons and hornbills, have been shown to be able to decide upon foraging areas according to the time of the year. Birds that show food hoarding behaviour have also shown the ability to recollect the locations of food caches. Nectarivorous birds such as hummingbirds also optimise their foraging by keeping track of the locations of good and bad flowers. Studies of western scrub jays also suggest that birds may be able to plan ahead. They cache food according to future needs and at the risk of not being able to find the food on subsequent days.

Many birds follow strict time schedules in their activities. These are often dependent upon environmental cues. Birds also are sensitive to day length, and this awareness is especially important as a cue for migratory species. The ability to orient themselves during migrations is typically attributed to birds' superior sensory abilities, rather than to intelligence.

=== Beat induction ===
Research published in 2008 that was conducted with an Eleonora's cockatoo named Snowball has shown that birds can identify the rhythmic beat of man-made music, an ability known as beat induction.

=== Self-awareness ===
A magpie repeatedly attempts to remove the marks applied in a mirror self-recognition test.

The mirror test gives insight into whether an animal is conscious of itself and able to distinguish itself from other animals by determining whether it possesses or lacks the ability to recognise itself in its own reflection. Mirror self-recognition has been demonstrated in Eurasian magpies, making them one of only a few animal species to possess this capability. In 1981, Epstein, Lanza, and Skinner published a paper in the journal Science in which they argued that pigeons also pass the mirror test. A pigeon was trained to look in a mirror to find a response key behind it which it then turned to peck—food was the consequence of a correct choice (i.e., the pigeon learned to use a mirror to find critical elements of its environment). Next, the bird was trained to peck at dots placed on its feathers; food was, again, the consequence of touching the dot. This was done without a mirror. Then a small bib was placed on the pigeon—enough to cover a dot placed on its lower belly. A control period without the mirror yielded no pecking at the dot. But when the mirror was shown, the pigeon became active, looked into it, and then tried to peck on the dot under the bib.

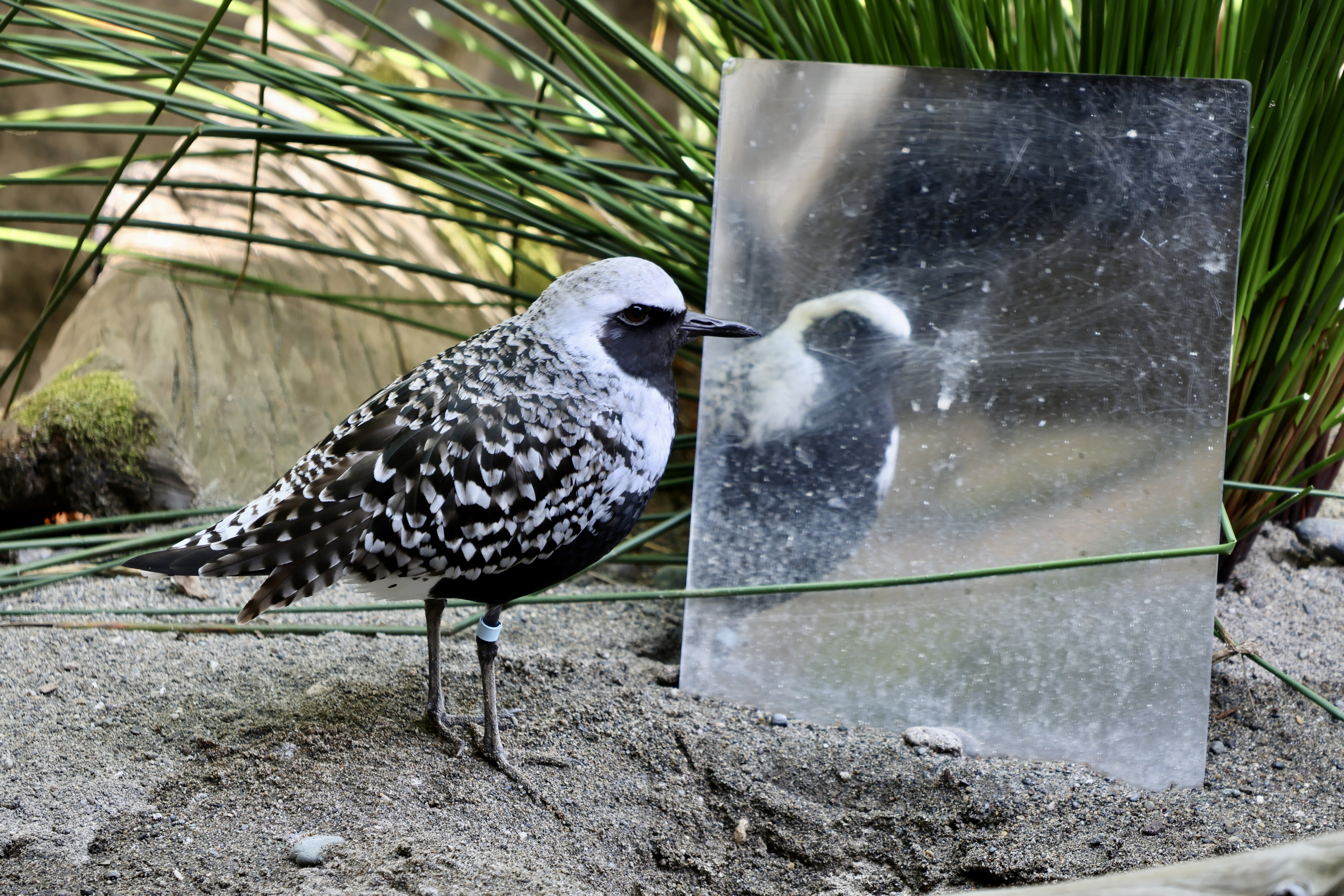
A grey plover looking at itself in a mirror at the Seattle Aquarium

Despite this, pigeons are not classified as being able to recognise their reflection, because only trained pigeons have been shown to pass the mirror test. The animal must demonstrate they can pass the test without prior experience or training with the testing procedure.

Some studies have suggested that birds—separated from mammals by over 300 million years of independent evolution—have developed brains capable of primate-like consciousness through a process of convergent evolution. Although avian brains are structurally very different from the brains of cognitively advanced mammals, each has the neural circuitry associated with higher-level consciousness, according to a 2006 analysis of the neuroanatomy of consciousness in birds and mammals. The study acknowledges that similar neural circuitry does not by itself prove consciousness, but notes its consistency with suggestive evidence from experiments on birds' working and episodic memories, sense of object permanence, and theory of mind (both covered below).

=== Tool use ===
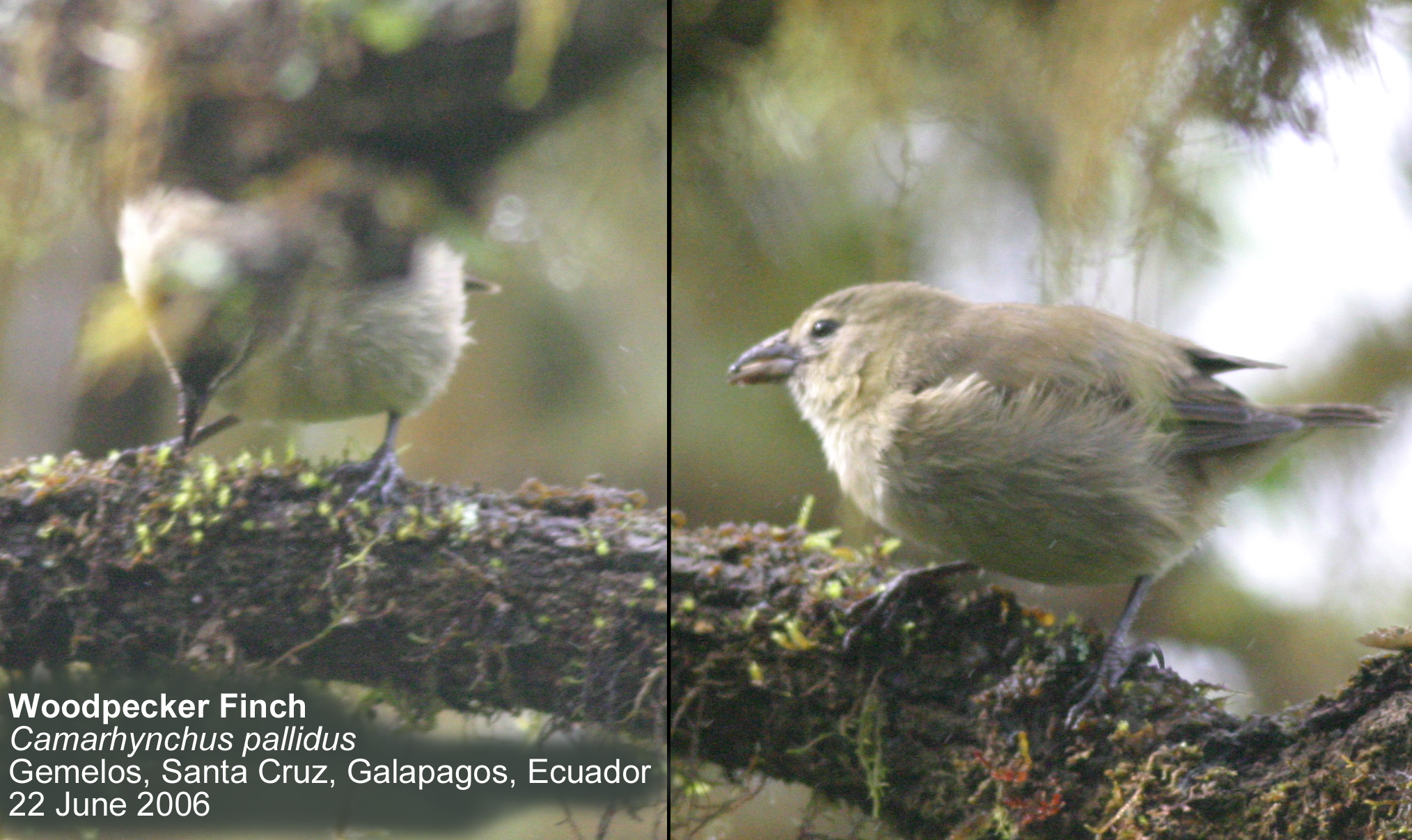
A woodpecker finch using a stick to impale a grub, with a second image showing it had successfully captured it

Many birds have been shown to be capable of using tools. The definition of a tool has been debated. One proposed definition of tool use was defined by T. B. Jones and A. C. Kamil in 1973 as

the use of physical objects other than the animal's own body or appendages as a means to extend the physical influence realised by the animal

By this definition, a bearded vulture (lammergeier) dropping a bone on a rock would not be using a tool since the rock cannot be seen as an extension of the body. However, the use of a rock manipulated using the beak to crack an ostrich egg would qualify the Egyptian vulture as a tool user. Many other species, including parrots, corvids, and a range of passerines, have been noted as tool users.

New Caledonian crows have been observed in the wild using sticks with their beaks to extract insects from logs. While young birds in the wild normally learn this technique from elders, a laboratory crow named Betty improvised a hooked tool from a wire with no prior experience, the only known species other than humans to do so. In 2014, a New Caledonian crow named "007" by researchers from the University of Auckland in New Zealand solved an eight-step puzzle to get to some food. Crows also fashion their own tools, the only bird that does so, out of the leaves of pandanus trees. Researchers have discovered that New Caledonian crows don't just use single objects as tools; they can also construct novel compound tools through assemblage of otherwise non-functional elements. The woodpecker finch from the Galapagos Islands also uses simple stick tools to assist it in obtaining food. In captivity, a young Española cactus finch learned to imitate this behaviour by watching a woodpecker finch in an adjacent cage.

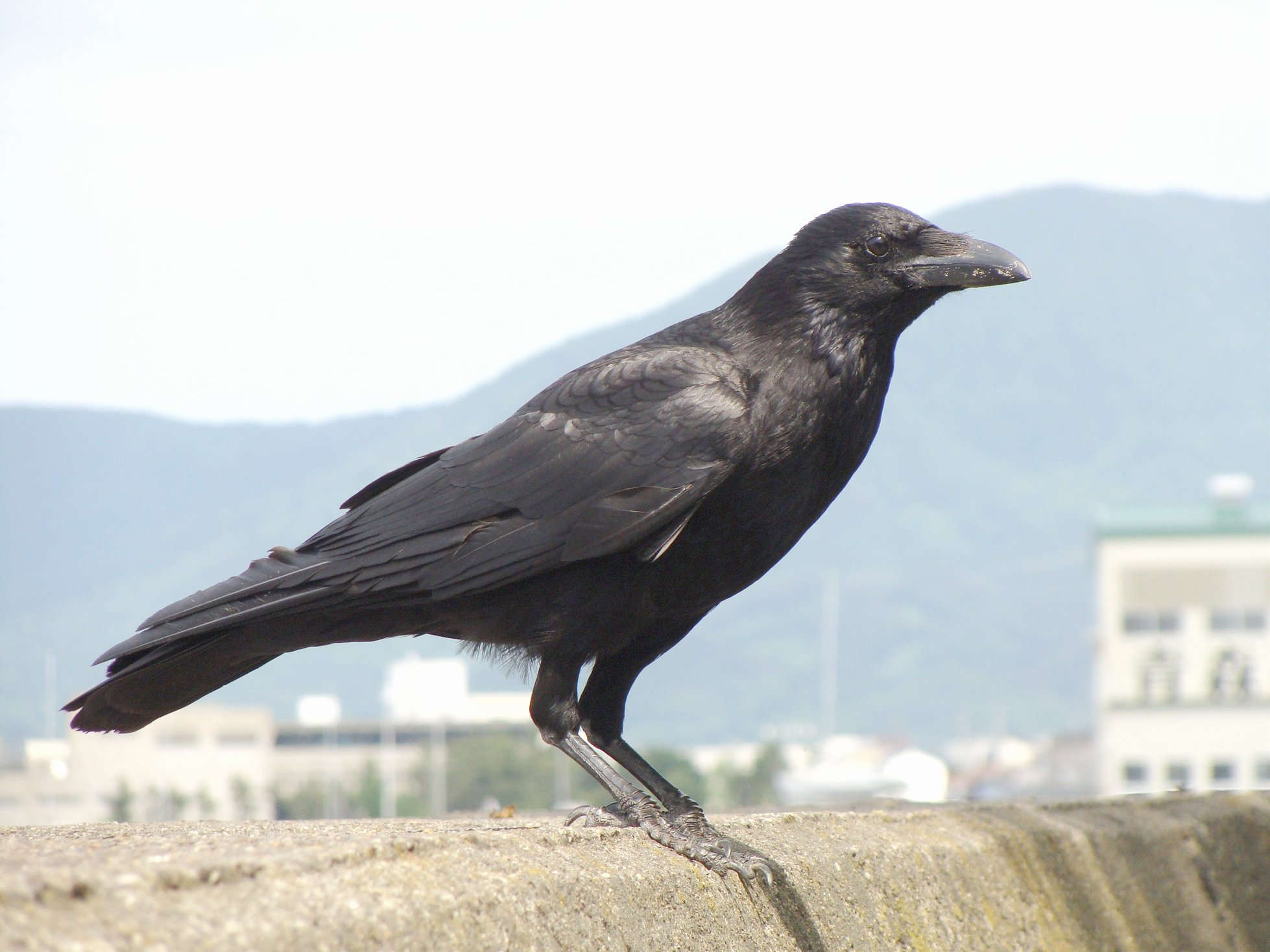
Eastern carrion crows (Corvus corone orientalis) in Japan have been observed taking advantage of road traffic to crack hard-shelled nuts.

Carrion crows (Corvus corone orientalis) in urban Japan and American crows (C. brachyrhynchos) in the United States have innovated a technique to crack hard-shelled nuts by dropping them onto crosswalks and letting them be run over and cracked by cars. They then retrieve the cracked nuts when the cars are stopped at the red light. Macaws have been shown to use a rope to fetch items that would normally be difficult to reach. Striated herons (Butorides striatus) use bait to catch fish.

=== Observational learning ===
Using rewards to reinforce responses is often used in laboratories to test intelligence. However, the ability of animals to learn by observation and imitation is considered more significant. Ravens have been noted for their ability to learn from each other.

A team from the University of Bristol demonstrated that avian predators may learn to avoid aposematic prey by recognising the plants on which they most commonly dwell, rather than the appearance of the prey alone. During periods with a higher proportion of juvenile birds, there was no difference in predation between host and non-host plants, suggesting that this avoidance behaviour is learned through foraging experience.

=== Brain anatomy ===
At the beginning of the 20th century, scientists argued that birds had hyper-developed basal ganglia, with tiny mammalian-like telencephalon structures. Modern studies have refuted this view. The basal ganglia only occupy a small part of the avian brain. Instead, it seems that birds use a different part of their brain, the medio-rostral neostriatum/hyperstriatum ventrale (see also nidopallium), as the seat of their intelligence, and the brain-to-body size ratio of psittacines (parrots) and corvines (birds of the crow family) is actually comparable to that of higher primates. Birds can also have twice the neuron packing density of primate brains, in some cases similar to the total number of neurons in much larger mammal brains, for a higher unit mass per volume. This suggests that the nuclear architecture of the avian brain has more efficient neuron packing and interconnections than mammal brains. The avian pallium's neuroarchitecture is reminiscent of the mammalian cerebral cortex, and has been suggested to be an equivalent neural basis for consciousness.

Studies with captive birds have given insight into which birds are the most intelligent. While parrots have the distinction of being able to mimic human speech, studies with the grey parrot have shown that some are able to associate words with their meanings and form simple sentences (see Alex). Parrots and the corvid family of crows, ravens, and jays are considered the most intelligent of birds. Research has shown that these species tend to have the largest high vocal centers. Dr. Harvey J. Karten, a neuroscientist at UCSD who has studied the physiology of birds, has discovered that the lower parts of avian brains are similar to those of humans.

=== Social behaviour ===
Social life has been considered a driving force for the evolution of intelligence in various types of animals. Many birds have social organisations, and loose aggregations are common. Many corvid species separate into small family groups or "clans" for activities such as nesting and territorial defence. The birds then congregate in massive flocks made up of several different species for migratory purposes. Some birds make use of teamwork while hunting. Predatory birds hunting in pairs have been observed using a "bait and switch" technique, whereby one bird will distract the prey while the other swoops in for the kill.

Social behaviour requires individual identification, and most birds appear to be capable of recognising mates, siblings, and young. Other behaviour, such as play and cooperative breeding are also considered indicators of intelligence.

Crows appear to be able to remember who observed them catching food. They also steal food caught by others.

In some fairy-wrens, such as the superb and red-backed fairy-wrens, males pick flower petals in colours contrasting with their bright nuptial plumage and present them to others of their species that will acknowledge, inspect, and sometimes manipulate the petals. This function seems not linked to sexual or aggressive activity in the short and medium term thereafter, though its function is apparently not aggressive and quite possibly sexual.

A study in 2023 found that some parrots in captivity could be trained to make video calls to each other. The parrots would ring a bell whenever they wanted to make a video call, and then chose the parrot on the screen they wanted to interact with. The parrots seemed to understand that another parrot existed on-screen and even learned new skills from each other, such as flying, foraging, and new sounds.

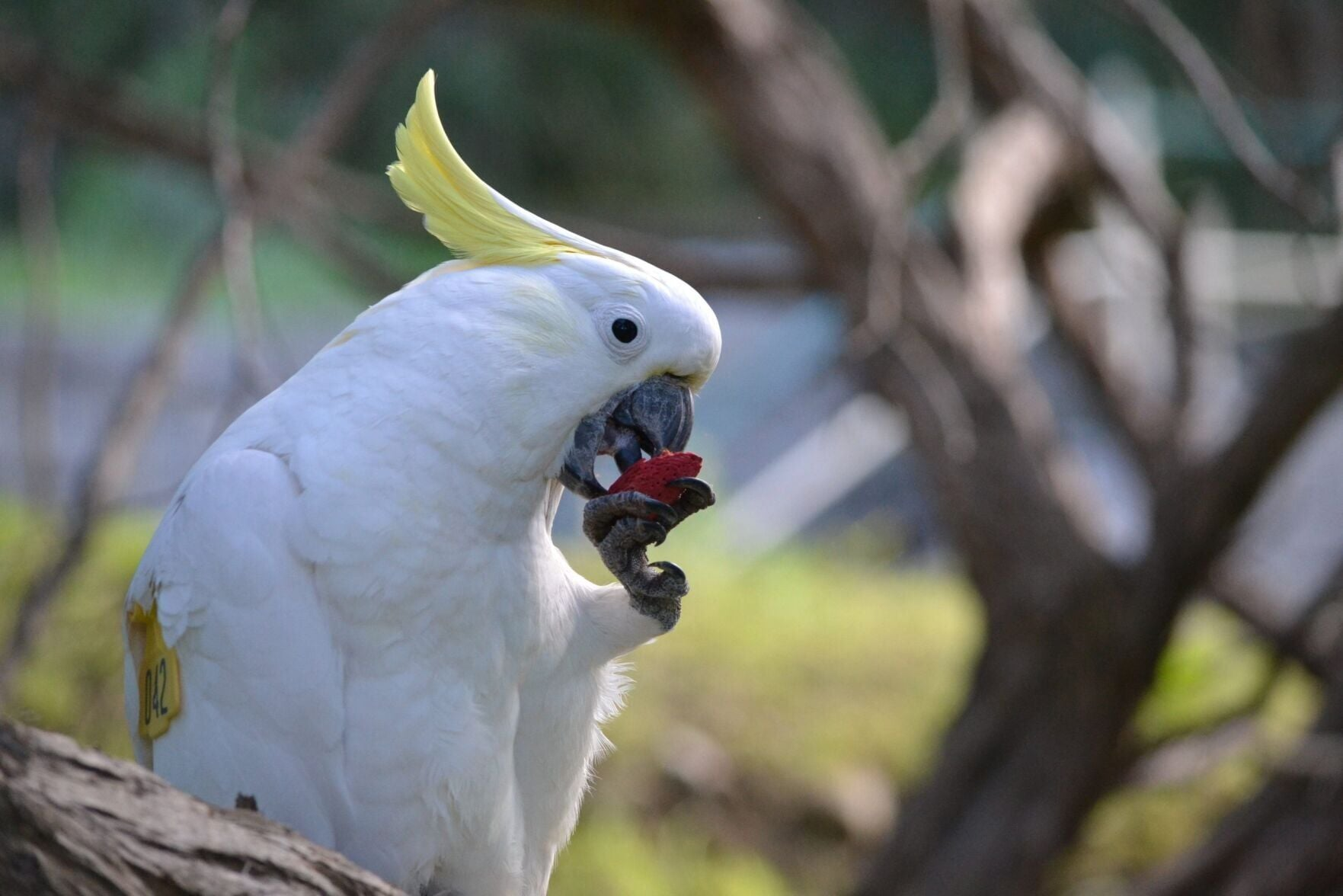
A sulphur-crested cockatoo eating a red-coloured almond as part of the experiment.

In 2026, a study by ANU research team showed that where adoption of novel food, such as almonds in a shell dyed blue or red for research purposes, by urban-living sulphur-crested cockatoos was concerned, spread of information occurred predominantly through social ties. Additionally, juveniles, unlike adult birds, demonstrated a conformist learning bias to prefer food of the colour most frequently chosen by others.

=== Communication ===
Birds communicate with their flockmates through song, calls, and body language. Studies have shown that the intricate territorial songs of some birds must be learned at an early age, and that the memory of the song will serve the bird for the rest of its life. Some bird species are able to communicate in several regional varieties of their songs. For example, the New Zealand saddleback will learn the different song "dialects" of clans of its own species, much as human beings might acquire diverse regional dialects. When a territory-owning male of the species dies, a young male will immediately take his place, singing to prospective mates in the dialect appropriate to the territory he is in. Similarly, around 300 tui songs have been recorded. The greater the competition in the area, it has been suggested, the more likely the birds are to actually create or make their song more complex.

Recent studies indicate that some birds may have an ability to memorise "syntactic" patterns of sounds, and that they can be taught to reject the ones determined to be incorrect by the human trainers. These experiments were carried out by combining whistles, rattles, warbles, and high-frequency motifs.

Crows have been studied for their ability to understand recursion.

=== Conceptual abilities ===
Evidence that birds can form abstract concepts such as "same vs. different" has been provided by a grey parrot named Alex. Alex was trained by animal psychologist Irene Pepperberg to vocally label more than 100 objects of different colours and shapes and which are made from different materials. Alex could also request or refuse these objects ("I want X") and quantify numbers of them. Alex was also used as a "teacher" for other younger grey parrots in Irene Pepperberg's lab. Alex would observe and listen to the training on many occasions, verbally correcting the younger learning parrot or calling out a correct answer before the learner could give a response.

Macaws have been demonstrated to comprehend the concept of "left" and "right".

=== Object permanence ===
Macaws, carrion crows, and chickens have been demonstrated to fully comprehend the concept of object permanence at a young age. Macaws will even refute the "A-not-B error". If they are shown an item, especially one with whose purpose they are familiar, they will search logically for where it could be feasibly placed. One test for this was done as follows: a macaw was shown an item; the item was then hidden behind the back of the trainer and placed in a container unfamiliar to the bird. Without the macaw watching, multiple objects were spread out on a table, including that container and another container. The macaw searched the target container, then the other, before returning to open the correct container; thereby demonstrating knowledge of and the ability to search for the item.

=== Theory of mind ===
A study on the little green bee-eater suggests that these birds may be able to see from the point of view of a predator. The brown-necked raven has been observed hunting lizards in complex cooperation with other ravens, demonstrating an apparent understanding of prey behaviour. The California scrub jay hides caches of food and will later re-hide food if it was watched by another bird the first time, but only if the bird hiding the food has itself stolen food before from a cache. A male Eurasian jay takes into account which food his bonded partner prefers to eat when feeding her during courtship feeding rituals. Such an ability to see from the point of view of another individual and to attribute motivations and desires had previously been attributed only to the great apes and elephants.

=== Conservation ===
Avian innovation and creativity may lead to more robust populations. Canadian biologist Louis Lefebvre states: "We have to do what we can to prevent habitat destruction and extinction of species, but there's a little bit of hope out there in how the species are able to respond". A 2020 study found that behavioural plasticity is associated with reduced extinction risk in birds.

== See also ==
- Animal intelligence
- Pigeon intelligence
- Evolution of cognition
- Pig intelligence
