= HVC (avian brain region) =

Nucleus in the brain of songbirds

The HVC in the context of the song-learning pathway in birds.

HVC (formerly, hyperstriatum ventrale, pars caudalis (HVc), and high vocal center) is a nucleus in the brain of the songbirds (order passeriformes) necessary for both the learning and the production of bird song. It is located in the lateral caudal nidopallium and has projections to both the direct and the anterior forebrain pathways.

It is notable that both of the other orders of birds that learn song, the hummingbirds and parrots, also seem to have structures similar to HVC. Since it is believed that all three of these groups independently derived the ability to learn song, it is believed that these other HVC-like structures are examples of homoplasy.

== Name ==
HVC was originally called the hyperstriatum ventrale, pars caudalis (HVc). Later neuroanatomy revealed this name to be incorrect, however, and many researchers referred to it as the high vocal center due to its important function in vocal learning. Following the Avian Brain Nomenclature Forum held at Duke University in July 2002 the nomenclature of the avian brain was officially revised in 2004, these names were officially dropped in order to correct the historical inaccuracies. The forum suggested, "For the sake of consistency ... using HVC as the proper name and recommends against using HVc or any form of the term “higher vocal center.” As there was "No easy solution for correcting original naming error for this structure" HVC was established as the formal name for the region and no longer stands for anything.

== Anatomy ==
HVC is located in the caudal nidopallium. It projects to the song motor pathway via the robust nucleus of the arcopallium (RA) and to the Anterior Forebrain Pathway via the basal ganglia nucleus Area X. It receives recurrent motor activity through the thalamic nucleus Uvaformis (Uva) and input from the auditory system through projections from the caudalateral mesopallium (CMM) and through the nucleus interfacialis (NIf). Four distinct types of neurons have been identified in HVC, each with unique anatomical and physiological properties: interneurons, RA-projecting cells (HVC_{RA}), and X-projecting cells (HVC_{X}), and Nucleus Avalanche (Av) projecting cells (HVC_{AV}).

== See also ==
- Bird vocalization
- Song control system
