= Pallium (neuroanatomy) =

Structure of the brain in vertebrates

- Schematic cross-section of the forebrain of a basal chordate such as a shark.

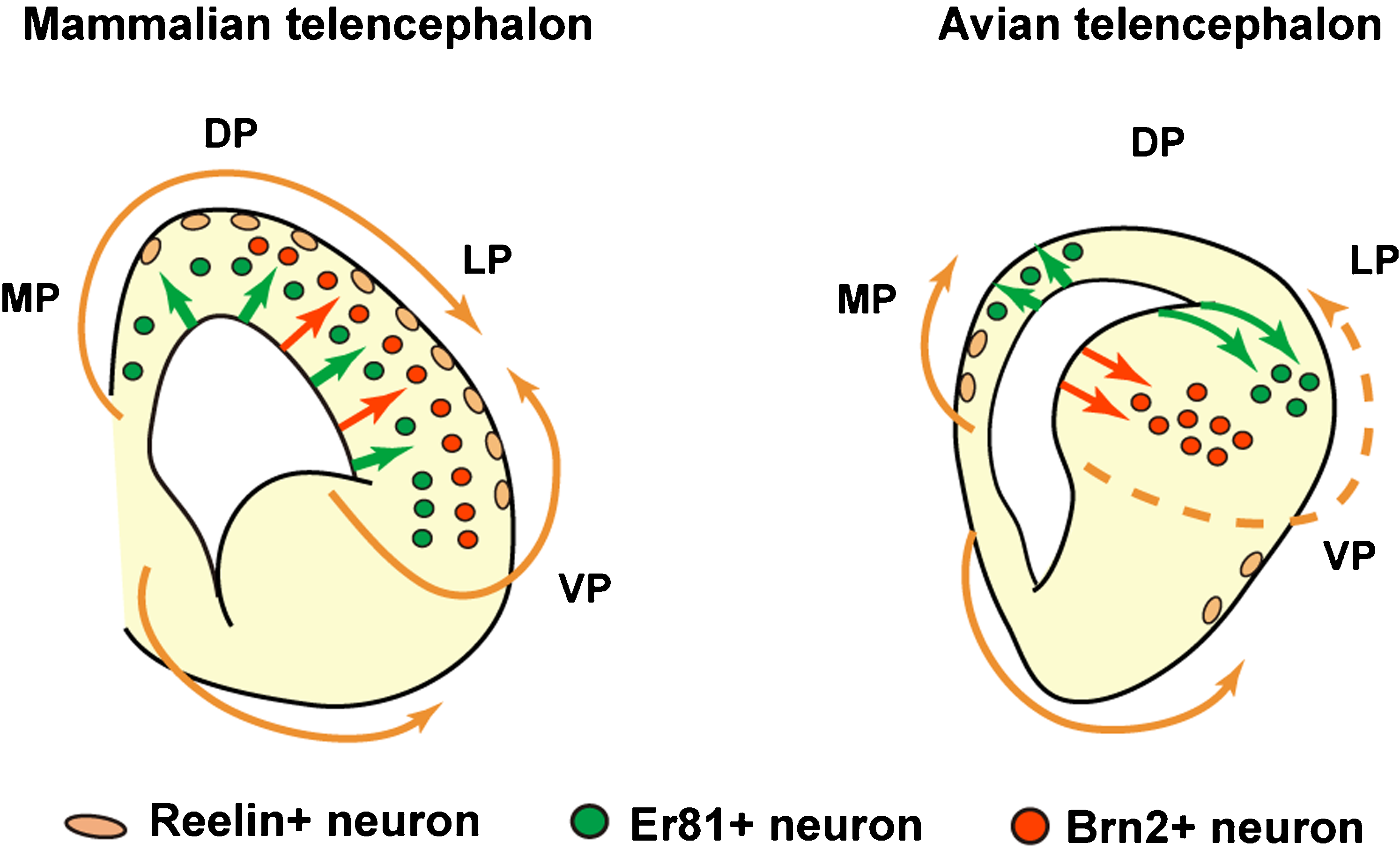
- Schematic illustration of differences in neuronal specification and migration patterns between the mammalian and avian pallium

Details
- Part of: Telencephalon

Identifiers
- Latin: pallium, or cortex cerebri
- NeuroLex ID: birnlex_1494
- TA98: A14.1.09.003
- TA2: 5527
- TE: (neuroanatomy)_by_E5.14.3.4.3.1.30 E5.14.3.4.3.1.30

In neuroanatomy, pallium (pl.: pallia or palliums) refers to the layers of grey and white matter that cover the upper surface of the cerebrum in vertebrates. The non-pallial part of the telencephalon builds the subpallium. In basal vertebrates, the pallium is a relatively simple three-layered structure, encompassing 3–4 histogenetically distinct domains, plus the olfactory bulb.

It used to be thought that pallium equals cortex and subpallium equals telencephalic nuclei, but it has turned out, according to comparative evidence provided by molecular markers, that the pallium develops both cortical structures (allocortex and isocortex) and pallial nuclei (claustroamygdaloid complex), whereas the subpallium develops striatal, pallidal, diagonal-innominate and preoptic nuclei, plus the corticoid structure of the olfactory tuberculum.

In mammals, the cortical part of the pallium registers a definite evolutionary step-up in complexity, forming the cerebral cortex, most of which consists of a progressively expanded six-layered portion isocortex, with simpler three-layered cortical regions allocortex at the margins. The allocortex subdivides into hippocampal allocortex, medially, and olfactory allocortex, laterally (including rostrally the olfactory bulb and anterior olfactory areas).

== Structure ==
The general layout or body plan of the pallium is already clearly defined in animals with relatively simple brains, including lampreys, sharks and amphibians. In teleost fish, reptiles, birds, and mammals, the pallial architecture is greatly modified (sharply diverging in fish), with differential growth and specialization of diverse sectors of the conserved pallial Bauplan. In all vertebrate brains, the telencephalic forebrain consists of two hemispheres, joined at the midline by a region called the septum. The septum is continuous with the preoptic area across the plane defined by the anterior commissure; it is largely subpallial, but also contains a small pallial portion, where the hippocampal commissure forms, which is contiguous to the medial pallium. The telencephalic part of the rostral choroidal tela (roof plate continuous caudally with a diencephalic part) is inserted at the back of this commissure at a locus where mammals show the subfornical circumventricular organ, and extends laterally over the interventricular foramen into a wing-shaped medial telencephalic territory, the so-called choroidal fissure. Here the choroidal tissue is attached to the fimbria of the hippocampus, bordering lengthwise the medial pallium. At its rostral and caudal ends, the medial pallium contacts the ventral pallium, which builds the pallial portion that contacts the subpallium across the pallio subpallial boundary, observed at the lateral telencephalic wall. Inside the ring formed thus by the medial and ventral pallium there is a sort of island that contains the dorsal and lateral pallial portions. In older literature the pallium used to be subdivided only into three zones, called the medial pallium, dorsal (or dorsolateral) pallium, and lateral pallium. The old lateral pallium encompassed the modern lateral and ventral parts of the pallium. The medial pallium is the progenitor of the mammalian hippocampus, and is thought to be involved in spatial cognitive mapping and memory formation across a broad range of species. The lateral and ventral pallium is the progenitor of the mammalian piriform cortex, and has an olfactory function in every species in which it has been studied. The evolutionary diversifications and specialization in functions of the dorsal pallium have been more difficult to decipher. It is widely believed to be the progenitor of the bulk of the mammalian cerebral cortex, although the evidence for this is considered by some anatomists not yet to be conclusive. In mammals and birds, the dorsal pallium increased in size and became the predominant brain region for sensory processing and the end site of sensory consciousness, the hypothesized reason for which is because of the nocturnal and burrowing lifestyle of ancestral mammals and the arboreal and volant lifestyle of ancestral birds.

Importantly, the lateral and ventral parts of the pallium produce also deep to their respective sectors of subpial olfactory cortex sets of pallial nuclei, the neurons entering the claustrum, rostrally, and the pallial amygdala, caudally. The concept of hypopallium refers to this histogenetically unitary complex of olfactory (piriform) cortex and deep pallial nuclei. In reptiles and birds the hypopallium becomes differentially enlarged (largest in crocodiles and birds, whose olfactory cortex gets nevertheless reduced), whereas in mammals it becomes reduced to the claustroamygdaloid complex and relatively enlarged olfactory (prepiriform and piriform) cortex.

The pallial amygdala contains mainly the so-called basolateral amygdala, encompassing the lateral, basolateral (basal) and basomedial (accessory basal) nuclei, plus the anterior, amygdalopiriform and posterolateral corticoid areas at its surface. The medial pallium also may contribute to the pallial amygdala, forming the amygdalohippocampal nucleus and the posteromedial corticoid area. It has been postulated that the neurons forming the nucleus of the lateral olfactory tract derive from the dorsal pallium and migrate tangentially into its final position caudal to the olfactory tuberculum. Situated ventral to the pallium in the basic vertebrate forebrain plan (though representing a topologically rostral field in neural plate fate maps) is another region of telencephalic gray matter known as the subpallium, which is the progenitor area for the basal ganglia, a set of structures that play a crucial role in the executive control of behavior. The subpallium region has distinct striatal, pallidal, diagonal and preoptic subregions, which are stretched obliquely between the septal midline and the amygdala at the posterior pole of the telencephalon. At least the striatum, pallidum and diagonal domains extend into the amygdala, representing there the subpallial amygdala, forming its central and medial nuclei, as well as the amygdaloid end of the bed nucleus stria terminalis complex.

The amygdala thus encompasses an heterogeneous group of subpallial nuclei and hypopallial olfactory and amygdalohippocampal corticonuclear cell masses which are on the whole heavily involved in emotion and motivation. The pallial portions build the analytic or perceptual end of this complex, whereas the subpallial portions represent the corresponding output or efferent functional pole. The olfactory bulb is a peculiar pallial outgrowth (maybe induced by the primary olfactory fibers afferent to it, coming from the sensory neurons developed in the olfactory placode) whose projection neurons (the mitral and tufted neurons) are pallial in origin and accordingly excitatory. In contrast, the superfial periglomerulary neurons, various intermediate interneurons and the deep granule cells are all of subpallial origin and migrate tangentially out of the striatal part of the subpallium (apparently from a dorsal subsector of this domain) through the so-called rostral migratory stream into the olfactory bulb. These extremely numerous subpallial cells are all inhibitory. The olfactory bulb is thus singularly formed by a minority of autochthonous pallial neurons and a majority of immigrated inhibitory subpallial cells (it is nevertheless classified as a part of the ventral pallium). There is also a modified accessory olfactory bulb at the base of the principal one, which is associated specifically to incoming afferents from Jacobson's organ found at the nasal septum. The accessory olfactory pathway is maximally developed in some reptiles (e.g., snakes) and is lost in birds.

== Evolution ==
The evolution of the dorsal pallium is not fully understood yet. Some authors hold that it largely contributes to the mammalian hippocampal allocortical and parahippocampal mesocortical (transitional) areas. Others postulate it directly transforms into the six-layered isocortex (neocortex) characteristic of mammals, and still others suppose that medial and lateral parts of the dorsal pallium contribute (perhaps with some contributions from the lateral pallium) to the alternative allocortical and isocortical fates.

=== In humans ===
The human pallium (from Latin 'cloak') envelops most of the telencephalon, due to extensive surface expansion of the isocortex. The telencephalic pallium has been described classically as having three parts: the archipallium, the paleopallium and the neopallium, but these concepts are now considered obsolete, having been substituted by the concept of medial pallium, dorsal pallium, lateral pallium and ventral pallium mentioned above under pallial Bauplan. Historically, anatomy textbooks stated that pallium is equivalent to cortex and subpallium to telencephalic nuclei. However, research involving molecular markers indicates, that the pallium develops both cortical structures (allocortex and isocortex) and pallial nuclei (claustroamygdaloid complex), whereas the subpallium develops striatal, pallidal, diagonal-innominate and preoptic nuclei, plus the corticoid structure of the olfactory tuberculum.

=== In amphibians and other anamniotes ===
In amphibians, the telencephalon distinctly shows medial, dorsal, lateral and ventral parts of the pallium, plus striatal, pallidal, diagonal and preoptic parts of the basal nuclei. However, the pallial portions do not show a visible lamination. They already have a mixture of glutamatergic (excitatory) and GABAergic (inhibitory) neurons, whereas the subpallium is largely populated by inhibitory neurons. This structure is very similar to that found generally in anamniotes, though cartilaginous fishes do show a layered arrangement of their pallial neurons.

=== In reptiles and birds ===
Reptiles developed a distinct three-layered structure of medial and dorsal portions of their pallium, a morphological schema referred to with the concept of allocortex. In contrast, the lateral and ventral pallium sectors of reptiles adopted hypopallial structure (superficial olfactory cortex, covering deep pallial nuclei). The hypopallial region is also known as the dorsal ventricular ridge, described as having anterior and posterior (amygdaloid) regions.

Birds essentially show much increased cellularity, keeping within the reptilian morphological schema, which leads to the apparent disappearance of layering within its medial and dorsal pallial sectors. The olfactory cortex is much reduced, whereas the hypopallial or dorsal ventricular ridge nuclei increase significantly in size and relative differentiation. From anterior to posterior, the parts are named hyperpallium, mesopallium, nidopallium, and the arcopallium.

== See also ==
- Avian pallium
