= Stereotaxic atlas =

Survey of the brain's structure

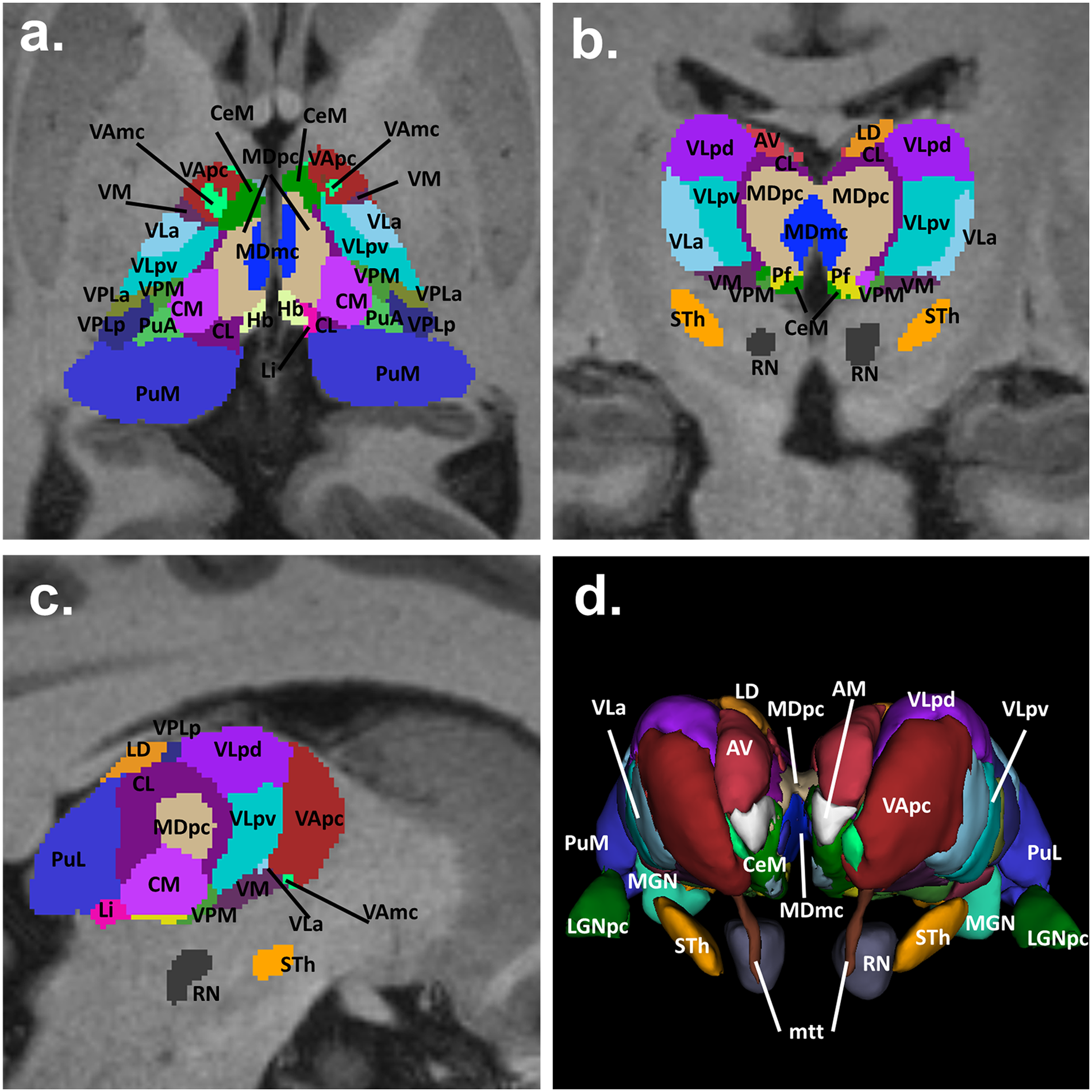
Part of a stereotaxic atlas showing the human thalamus and nuclei

A stereotaxic atlas is a number of records of brain structure of a particular animal accompanied with coordinates used in stereotactic surgery. Stereotaxic atlases are developed using MRI data from a large number of subjects to visualize the topology of the brain. This allows for highly accurate, minimally invasive surgery based on 3D imaging. The development of stereotaxic atlases has been particularly important in making it possible to operate on areas deep in the brain that are not accessible through traditional surgical methods.
