= Arcopallium =

Regions of the avian brain

Identifiers
- NeuroLex ID: nlx_144487

The arcopallium refers to regions of the avian brain which partially overlap regions homologous to the amygdala of mammals. These regions have formerly been referred to as archistriatum, and before this epistriatum or amygdaloid complex, and a recent change of nomenclature has divided the region into the arcopallium and posterior pallial amygdala. The new nomenclature, adopted in 2004, reflects a modern understanding that the avian brain is broadly similar to the mammalian brain, containing large regions homologous to the mammalian neocortex, claustrum, and pallial amygdala. The outdated nomenclature it replaced perceived the avian brain as consisting almost entirely of enlarged basal ganglia, to which more complex outer layers had been added during a progress toward mammalian intelligence.

== Reassignments ==
Specific reassignments of terminology were made with consideration of retaining abbreviations, and include:

- Archistriatum: Arcopallium (A)
- Nucleus archistriatalis anterior: Anterior arcopallium (AA)
- Archistriatum, pars dorsalis: Dorsal arcopallium (AD)
- Upper part of Archistriatum, pars ventralis: Intermediate arcopallium (AI)
- Medial part of Archistriatum, pars ventralis: Medial arcopallium (AM)
- Robust nucleus of archistriatum in male songbirds: Robust nucleus of arcopallium (RA)
- Central nucleus of anterior archistriatum in parrots: Central nucleus of anterior arcopallium (AAC)
- Ventral part of Archistriatum, pars ventralis plus caudal part of Archistriatum: Posterior nucleus of the pallial amygdala (PoA)
- Nucleus taeniae: Nucleus taeniae of the amygdala (Tn/TnA)
- Region below paleostriatum primitivum posterior to anterior commissure: Subpallial amygdaloid area (PA/SpA)

== See also ==
- Avian pallium
