= Nidopallium =

Region of in avian brains

The nidopallium, meaning nested pallium, is the region of the avian brain that is used mostly for some types of executive functions but also for other higher cognitive tasks. The region was renamed nidopallium in 2002 during the Avian Brain Nomenclature Consortium because the prior name, neostriatum, suggested that the region was used for more primitive functions as the neostriatum in mammalian brains is sub-cortical.

== Anatomy ==
The avian nidopallium is an area of the cortical telencephalon of the avian forebrain, and is itself subdivided into smaller regions as a result of further functional localisation. It has been apportioned along the rostrocaudal (anteroposterior) axis into three hypothetical segments: the rostral, intermediate and caudal nidopallium. These three regions are themselves trichotomised: the caudal nidopallium, for example, aggregates the nidopallium caudocentral (NCC), caudomedial (NCM) and caudolateral (NCL). It is the nidopallium caudolaterale which is thought to undertake many of the complex, higher order cognitive functions in birds. Rehkamper et al. (1985) further demarcated the nidopallium into 16 separate sections (distinguished by differing cell densities in these areas), although the previously stated anatomical divisions are generally accepted for most purposes for delineating between the nidopallium's various functional specialisations.

== Function ==
The entire nidopallium region is a compelling area for neuroscientific research, especially in relation to its capacity for complex cognitive function. More specifically, the nidopallium caudolateral appears particularly involved with the aspect of executive function in the avian brain. One study has been performed to demonstrate that this area is in fact largely analogous to the mammalian prefrontal cortex – the region of the brain covering the most rostral section of the frontal lobe, responsible for more complex cognitive behaviour in mammals, such as humans. The experiment sought to measure the densities of various neurotransmitter receptors in both the avian NCL and the human prefrontal cortex, using quantitative in-vitro receptor autoradiography. It was found that the NCL contained lower absolute quantities of these neuronal receptors. However, the experiment also revealed that the relative densities of these receptors in both organisms were surprisingly similar. With this, there is the possible implication that the capability for such sophisticated mental processes in these structures is reliant on the receptor architecture of the neurons which comprise them. So despite the nidopallium and prefrontal cortex having evolved separately (an educated assumption), both have achieved similar functions of higher order thought processes via convergent evolution, as a result of influences at the molecular level.

The nidopallium is also heavily innervated by dopaminergic neurons from the direction of the brainstem. It is thought that the high concentration of dopamine (a neurotransmitter often involved with motivation, reward circuits and motor control) in this area may contribute to the ability of the NCL to execute higher order cognitive functions. Furthermore, the neural activity of the nidopallium greatly increases when birds are exposed to reward-predicting visual stimuli. This, once more, evidences the considerable presence of dopaminergic neurons in this area, as implied by their stereotypical activation in anticipation of reward.

Migration is one of the many intricate behavioural processes governed by the nidopallium in birds. Studies have shown that there is significant neuronal recruitment to this region of the avian brain during migratory flight, with the objective of enhancing cognitive potency in the nidopallium. As a result, the birds benefit from improved navigational capabilities during migration, prompted by the significant changes in spatial sensory stimuli. This is a distinct example of neuroplasticity in the avian brain, and has been used to extend our understanding of the nidopallium. The experimental method is similar to that of lesion-deficit analysis, whereby scientists examine the deficiencies of patients with particular brain lesions in order to determine the function of the affected part of the brain. Alternatively, the avian migration experiment was able to analyse the role of the nidopallium because its functional capacity was enhanced, rather than diminished.

== See also ==
- Avian pallium
- Brain
- Prefrontal cortex
