= Hyperpallium =

Structure in the brains of birds

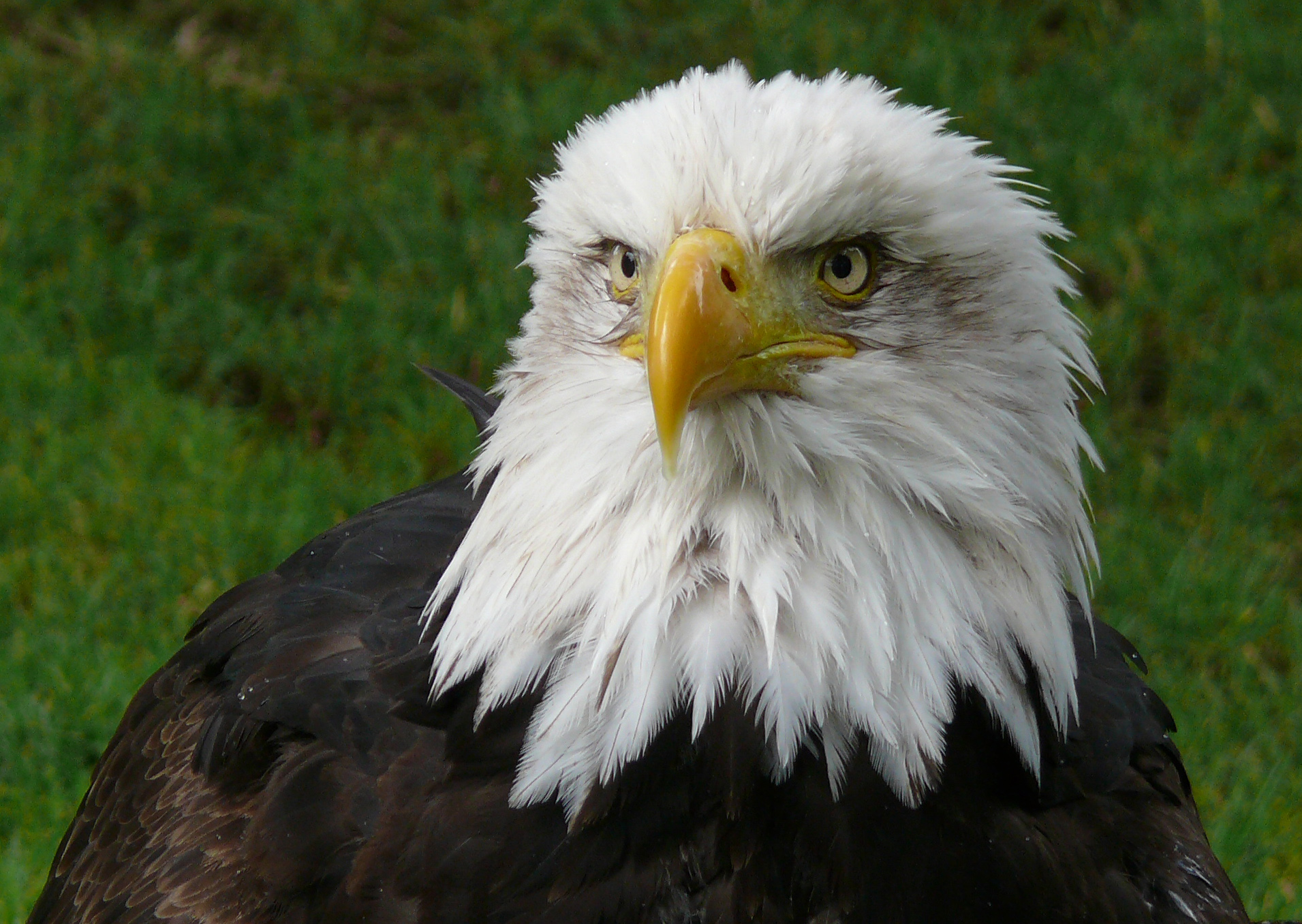

The hyperpallium (formerly called the hyperstriatum or the wulst) is a brain structure in birds and the destination for lemnothalamic projection. The projections as well as the granule cells at the destination of the lemnothalamic projections to the hyperpallium are similar in morphology, electrophysiology, retinotopic organization, and columnar organization to the striate cortex in mammals. These avian granule cells are thought to have evolved independently in birds, as they do not appear in reptiles.

The projections originate in the dorsal lateral geniculate nucleus and target three layers in the hyperpallium: the hyperpallium intercalatum, the hyperpallium densocellularis, and the nucleus interstitialis hyperpalii apicalis, with the densest projections being to the later two layers.

The efferents of the telencephalic components of the lemnothalamic pathway project to the optic tectum (equivalent to the superior colliculus), the lemnothalamic visual nucleus, as well as other optic tract targets.

The hyperpallium is observed to be large and well developed in raptors such as eagles, hawks, and owls.
