= Bird vocalization =

Sounds birds use to communicate

An eastern towhee (Pipilo erythrophthalmus) singing, Jamaica Bay Wildlife Refuge, United States

Blackbird song

Bird vocalization includes both bird calls and bird songs. In non-technical use, bird songs (often simply birdsong) are the sounds produced by birds that are melodious to the human ear. In ornithology and birding, songs (relatively complex vocalizations) are distinguished by function from calls (relatively simple vocalizations).

== Definition ==
Eastern wood pewee: note the simple repetitive pattern of ascending and descending tones from a grounding note.

The distinction between songs and calls is based upon complexity, length, and context. Songs are longer and more complex and are associated with territory and courtship and mating, while calls tend to serve such functions as alarms or keeping members of a flock in contact. Other authorities such as Howell and Webb (1995) make the distinction based on function, so that short vocalizations, such as those of pigeons, and even non-vocal sounds, such as the drumming of woodpeckers and the "winnowing" of snipes' wings in display flight, are considered song. Still, others require songs to have syllabic diversity and temporal regularity akin to the repetitive and transformative patterns that define music. It is generally agreed upon in birding and ornithology that certain sounds are considered songs. In contrast, others are classified as calls, and a good field guide will differentiate between the two.

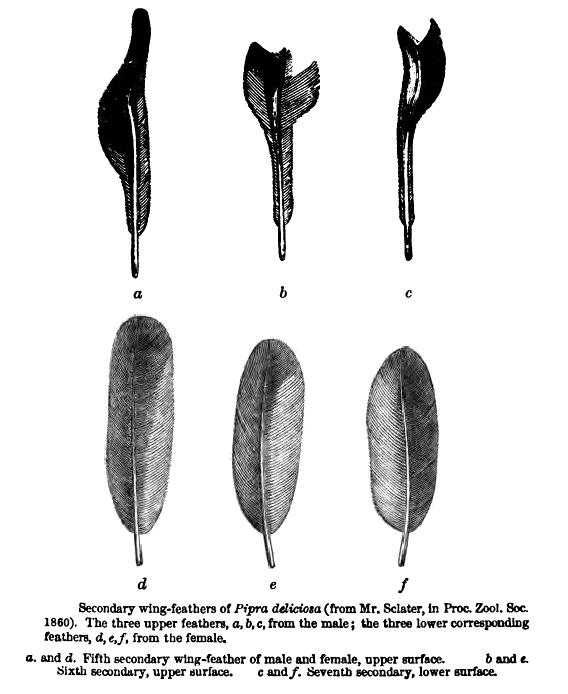
Wing feathers of a male club-winged manakin, with the modifications noted by P. L. Sclater in 1860 and discussed by Charles Darwin in 1871. The bird produces sound with its wings.

Bird song is best developed in the order Passeriformes. Some groups are nearly voiceless, producing only percussive and rhythmic sounds, such as the storks, which clatter their bills. In some manakins (Pipridae), the males have evolved several mechanisms for producing mechanical sounds, including stridulation mechanisms similar to those found in some insects. The production of sounds by mechanical means, as opposed to the use of the syrinx, has been termed variously as instrumental music by Charles Darwin, mechanical sounds, and more recently sonation. The term sonate has been defined as the act of producing non-vocal sounds that are intentionally modulated communicative signals, produced using non-syringeal structures such as the bill, wings, tail, feet, and body feathers.

Song is usually delivered from prominent perches, although some species may sing when flying.

In extratropical Eurasia and the Americas almost all song is produced by male birds; however, in the tropics and to a greater extent the desert belts of Australia and Africa it is more typical for females to sing as much as males. These differences are generally attributed to the much less regular and seasonal climate of Australian and African arid zones requiring that birds breed at any time when conditions are favourable, although they cannot breed in many years because food supply never increases above a minimal level. With aseasonal irregular breeding, both sexes must be brought into breeding condition and vocalization, especially duetting, serves this purpose. The high frequency of female vocalizations in the tropics, Australia, and Southern Africa may also relate to very low mortality rates, producing much stronger pair-bonding and territoriality.

== Anatomy and physiology ==
A red-legged seriema (Cariama cristata) from Brazil making a series of calls

The avian vocal organ is called the syrinx; it is a bony structure at the bottom of the trachea (unlike the larynx at the top of the mammalian trachea). The syrinx and sometimes a surrounding air sac resonate to sound waves that are made by membranes past which the bird forces air. The bird controls the pitch by changing the tension on the membranes and controls both pitch and volume by changing the force of exhalation. It can control the two sides of the trachea independently, which is how some species can produce two notes at once.

In February 2023, scientists reported that the possible sounds that ankylosaur dinosaurs may have made were bird-like vocalizations (in the above sense of production not at the larynx but then modified by it) based on a finding of a fossilized larynx from the ankylosaur Pinacosaurus grangeri.

== Function ==
=== Social ===
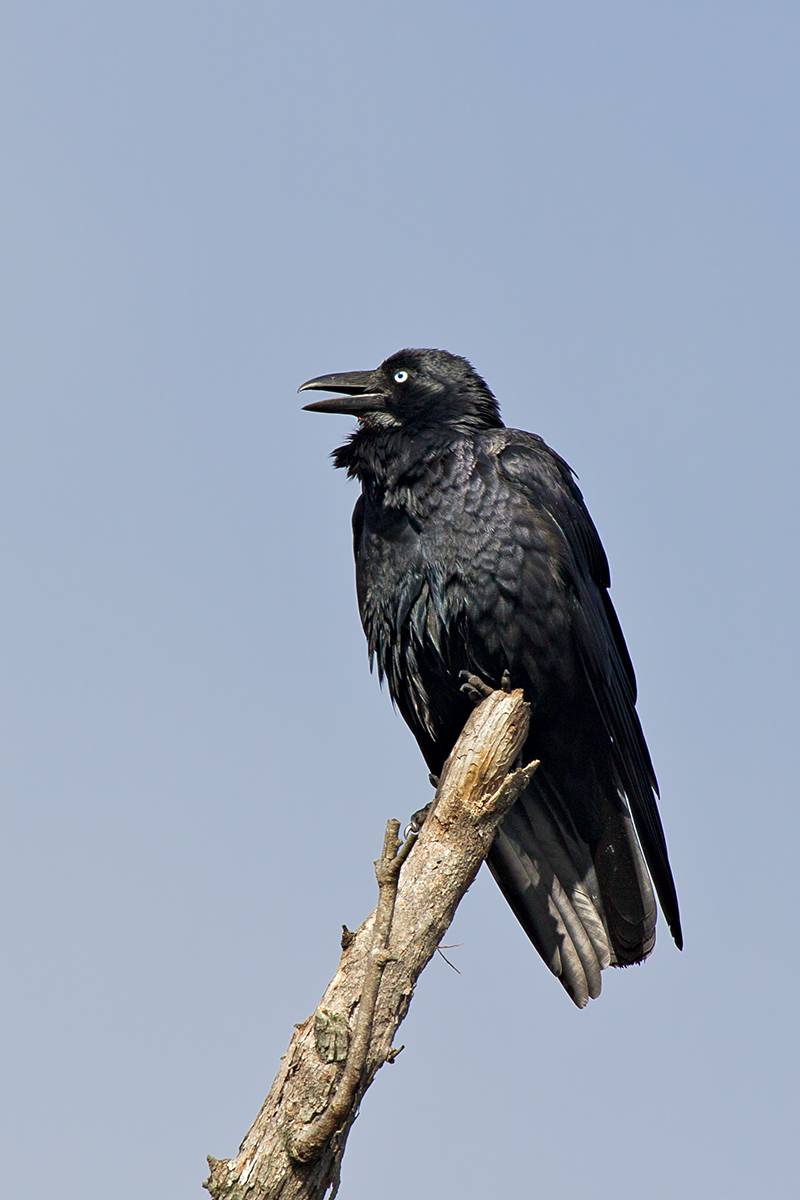
The Western Australian raven (Corvus coronoides, ssp. perplexus) makes a slow, high-pitched ah-ah-aaaah sound. Australian raven territorial call

One of the two main functions of bird song is mate attraction. Scientists hypothesize that bird song evolved through sexual selection, and experiments suggest that the quality of bird song may be a good indicator of fitness. Experiments also suggest that parasites and diseases may directly affect song characteristics such as song rate, which thereby act as reliable indicators of health. The song repertoire also appears to indicate fitness in some species. The ability of male birds to hold and advertise territories using song also demonstrates their fitness. Therefore, a female bird may select males based on the quality of their songs and the size of their song repertoire.

The second principal function of bird song is territory defense. Territorial birds will interact with each other using song to negotiate territory boundaries. Since song may be a reliable indicator of quality, individuals may be able to discern the quality of rivals and prevent an energetically costly fight. In birds with song repertoires, individuals may share the same song type and use these song types for more complex communication. Some birds will respond to a shared song type with a song-type match (i.e. with the same song type). This may be an aggressive signal; however, results are mixed. Birds may also interact using repertoire-matches, wherein a bird responds with a song type that is in its rival's repertoire but is not the song that it is currently singing. This may be a less aggressive act than song-type matching. Song complexity is also linked to male territorial defense, with more complex songs being perceived as a greater territorial threat.

Communication through bird calls can be between individuals of the same species or even across species. For example, the Japanese tit will respond to the recruitment call of the willow tit as long as it follows the Japanese tit alert call in the correct alert+recruitment order.

Individual birds may be sensitive enough to identify each other through their calls. Many birds that nest in colonies can locate their chicks using their calls. Calls are sometimes distinctive enough for individual identification even by human researchers in ecological studies.

Call of black-capped chickadee (note the call and response with a second more distant chickadee)

Over 400 bird species engage in duet calls. In some cases, the duets are so perfectly timed as to appear almost as one call. This kind of calling is termed antiphonal duetting. Such duetting is noted in a wide range of families including quails, bushshrikes, babblers such as the scimitar babblers, and some owls and parrots. In territorial songbirds, birds are more likely to countersing when they have been aroused by simulated intrusion into their territory. This implies a role in intraspecies aggressive competition towards joint resource defense. Duets are well known in cranes, but sarus cranes seem unique in that they infrequently bond in threes and perform "triets" while defending one territory. Triets had a lower frequency relative to duets, but the functional value of this difference is not yet known.

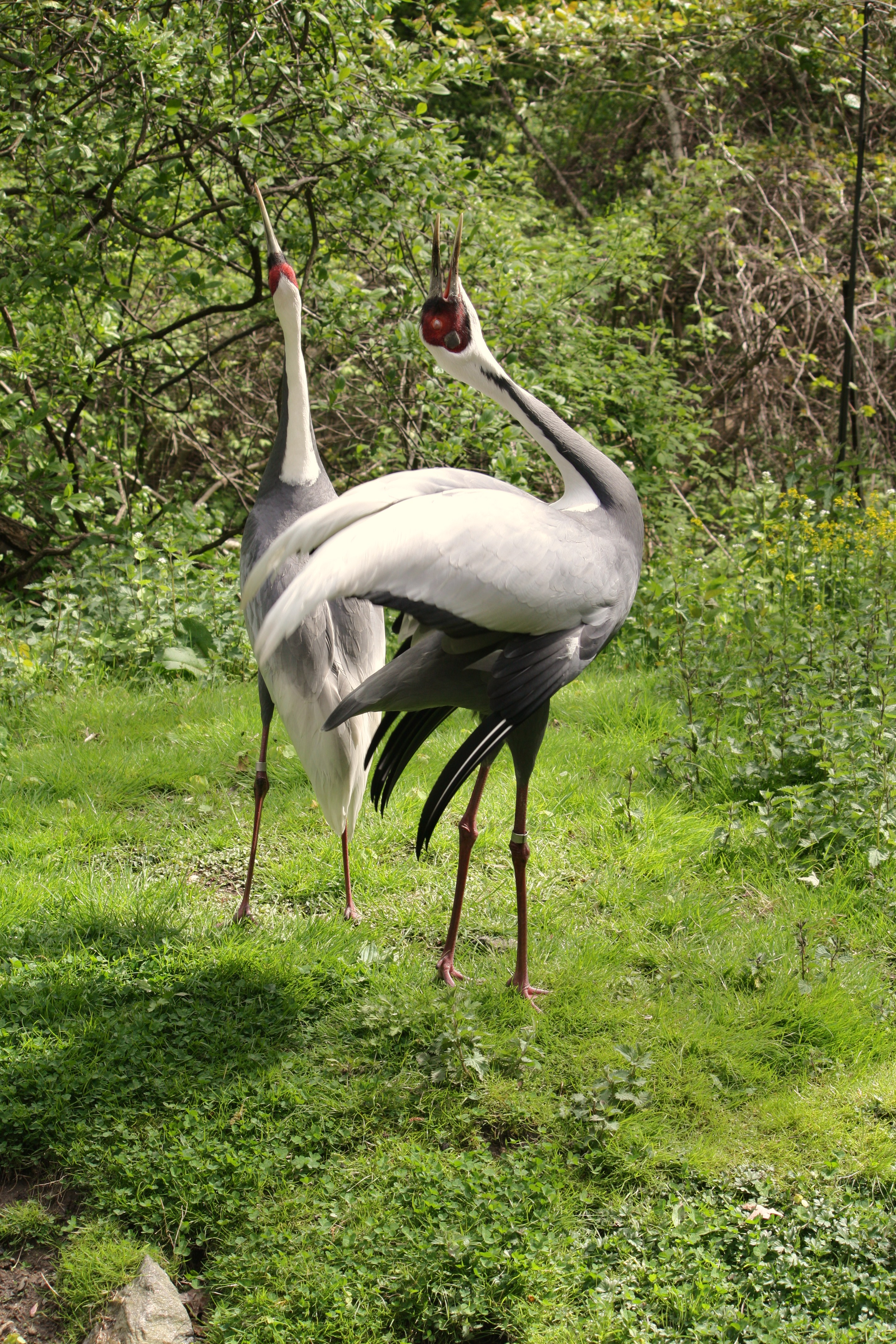
A mated pair of white-naped cranes (Antigone vipio) performing a "unison call", which strengthens the pair bond and provides a territorial warning to other cranes

A 2023 study found a correlation between the dawn chorus of male birds and the absence of females. The research was conducted in southern Germany, with male blue tits being the birds of interest. Researchers "found that the males sang at high rates while their female partners were still roosting in the nest box at dawn, and stopped singing as soon as the females left the nest box to join them". The males were also more likely to sing when the females entered the nests in the evening or even during the daytime. While this information is eye-opening, it still does not answer the question of why male birds sing more when females are absent.

Sometimes, songs vocalized in the post-breeding season act as a cue to conspecific eavesdroppers. In black-throated blue warblers, males that have bred and reproduced successfully sing to their offspring to influence their vocal development, while males that have failed to reproduce usually abandon the nests and stay silent. The post-breeding song therefore inadvertently informs the unsuccessful males of particular habitats that have a higher likelihood of reproductive success. The social communication by vocalization provides a shortcut to locating high quality habitats and saves the trouble of directly assessing various vegetation structures.

=== Alarm ===
Birds communicate alarm through vocalizations and movements that are specific to the threat, and bird alarms can be understood by other animal species, including other birds, in order to identify and protect against the specific threat. Mobbing calls are used to recruit individuals in an area where an owl or other predator may be present. These calls are characterized by wide frequency spectra, sharp onset and termination, and repetitiveness that are common across species and are believed to be helpful to other potential "mobbers" by being easy to locate. The alarm calls of most species, on the other hand, are characteristically high-pitched, making the caller difficult to locate.

=== Mimicry ===
Some birds are excellent vocal mimics. In some tropical species, mimics such as the drongos may have a role in the formation of mixed-species foraging flocks. Vocal mimicry can include conspecifics, other species or even man-made sounds. Many hypotheses have been made on the functions of vocal mimicry including suggestions that they may be involved in sexual selection by acting as an indicator of fitness, help brood parasites, or protect against predation, but strong support is lacking for any function. Many birds, especially those that nest in cavities, are known to produce a snakelike hissing sound that may help deter predators at close range.

Starlings imitate a variety of other avian species and have a repertoire of about 15–20 distinct imitations. They also imitate a few sounds other than those of wild birds. The calls of abundant species or calls that are simple in frequency structure and show little amplitude modulation are preferentially imitated. Dialects of mimicked sounds can be local.

=== Echolocation ===
Some cave-dwelling species, including the oilbird and swiftlets (Collocalia and Aerodramus species), use audible sound (with the majority of sonic location occurring between 2 and 5 kHz) to echolocate in the darkness of caves.

== Qualities ==
It has been proposed that birds show latitudinal variation in song complexity; however, there is no strong evidence that song complexity increases with latitude or migratory behaviour.

=== Frequency ===
The range of frequencies at which birds call in an environment varies with the quality of habitat and the ambient sounds. The acoustic adaptation hypothesis predicts that narrow bandwidths, low frequencies, and long elements and inter-element intervals should be found in habitats with complex vegetation structures (which would absorb and muffle sounds), while high frequencies, broad bandwidth, high-frequency modulations (trills), and short elements and inter-elements may be expected in open habitats, without obstructive vegetation.

Low frequency songs are optimal for obstructed, densely vegetated habitats because low frequency, slowly modulated song elements are less susceptible to signal degradation by means of reverberations off of sound-reflecting vegetation. High frequency calls with rapid modulations are optimal for open habitats because they degrade less across open space. The acoustic adaptation hypothesis also states that song characteristics may take advantage of beneficial acoustic properties of the environment. Narrow-frequency bandwidth notes are increased in volume and length by reverberations in densely vegetated habitats.

The hearing range of birds is from below 50 Hz (infrasound) to around 12 kHz, with maximum sensitivity between 1 and 5 kHz. The black jacobin is exceptional in producing sounds at about 11.8 kHz. It is not known if they can hear these sounds. The only bird known to make use of infrasound (at about 20 Hz) is the western capercaillie.

It has been hypothesized that the available frequency range is partitioned, and birds call so that overlap between different species in frequency and time is reduced. This idea has been termed the "acoustic niche". Birds sing louder and at a higher pitch in urban areas, where there is ambient low-frequency noise. Traffic noise was found to decrease reproductive success in the great tit (Parus major) due to the overlap in acoustic frequency. During the COVID-19 pandemic, reduced traffic noise led to birds in San Francisco singing 30% more softly. An increase in song volume restored fitness to birds in urban areas, as did higher frequency songs.

=== Volume ===
According to a study published in 2019, the white bellbird makes the loudest call ever recorded for birds, reaching a sound pressure level (SPL) of 125 dB. The record was previously held by the screaming piha with an SPL of 116 dB.

== Neuroanatomy ==
Song-learning pathway in birds

The acquisition and learning of bird song involves a group of distinct brain areas that are aligned in two connecting pathways:

- Anterior forebrain pathway (vocal learning): composed of Area X, which is a homologue to mammalian basal ganglia; the lateral part of the magnocellular nucleus of anterior nidopallium (LMAN), also considered a part of the avian basal ganglia; and the dorso-lateral division of the medial thalamus (DLM).
- Posterior descending pathway (vocal production): composed of HVC (proper name, although sometimes referred to as the high vocal center); the robust nucleus of the arcopallium (RA); and the tracheosyringeal part of the hypoglossal nucleus (nXIIts).

The posterior descending pathway (PDP) is required throughout a bird's life for normal song production, while the anterior forebrain pathway (AFP) is necessary for song learning, plasticity, and maintenance, but not for adult song production.

Both neural pathways in the song system begin at the level of HVC, which projects information both to the RA (premotor nucleus) and to Area X of the anterior forebrain. Information in the posterior descending pathway (also referred to as the vocal production or motor pathway) descends from HVC to RA, and then from RA to the tracheosyringeal part of the hypoglossal nerve (nXIIts), which then controls muscular contractions of the syrinx.

Information in the anterior forebrain pathway is projected from HVC to Area X (basal ganglia), then from Area X to the DLM (thalamus), and from DLM to LMAN, which then links the vocal learning and vocal production pathways through connections back to the RA. Some investigators have posited a model in which the connection between LMAN and RA carries an instructive signal based on evaluation of auditory feedback (comparing the bird's own song to the memorized song template), which adaptively alters the motor program for song output. The generation of this instructive signal could be facilitated by auditory neurons in Area X and LMAN that show selectivity for the temporal qualities of the bird's own song (BOS) and its tutor song, providing a platform for comparing the BOS and the memorized tutor song.

Models regarding the real-time error-correction interactions between the AFP and PDP will be considered in the future. Other current research has begun to explore the cellular mechanisms underlying HVC control of temporal patterns of song structure and RA control of syllable production. Brain structures involved in both pathways show sexual dimorphism in many bird species, usually causing males and females to sing differently. Some of the known types of dimorphisms in the brain include the size of nuclei, the number of neurons present, and the number of neurons connecting one nucleus to another.

In the extremely dimorphic zebra finches (Taeniopygia guttata), a species in which only males typically sing, the size of the HVC and RA are approximately three to six times larger in males than in females, and Area X does not appear to be recognizable in females. Research suggests that exposure to sex steroids during early development is partially responsible for these differences in the brain. Female zebra finches treated with estradiol after hatching followed by testosterone or dihydrotestosterone (DHT) treatment in adulthood will develop an RA and HVC similar in size to males and will also display male-like singing behavior.

Hormone treatment alone does not seem to produce female finches with brain structures or behavior exactly like males. Furthermore, other research has shown results that contradict what would be expected based on our current knowledge of mammalian sexual differentiation. For example, male zebra finches castrated or given sex steroid inhibitors as hatchlings still develop normal masculine singing behavior. This suggests that other factors, such as the activation of genes on the z chromosome, might also play a role in normal male song development.

Hormones also have activational effects on singing and the song nuclei in adult birds. In canaries (Serinus canaria), females normally sing less often and with less complexity than males. However, when adult females are given androgen injections, their singing will increase to an almost male-like frequency. Furthermore, adult females injected with androgens also show an increased size in the HVC and RA regions. Melatonin is another hormone that is also believed to influence song behavior in adults, as many songbirds show melatonin receptors in neurons of the song nuclei.

Both the European starling (Sturnus vulgaris) and house sparrow (Passer domesticus) have demonstrated changes in song nuclei correlated with differing exposures to darkness and secretions of melatonin. This suggests that melatonin might play a role in the seasonal changes of singing behavior in songbirds that live in areas where the amount of daylight varies significantly throughout the year. Several other studies have looked at seasonal changes in the morphology of brain structures within the song system and have found that these changes (adult neurogenesis, gene expression) are dictated by photoperiod, hormonal changes and behavior.

The gene FOXP2, defects of which affect both speech production and comprehension of language in humans, becomes highly expressed in Area X during periods of vocal plasticity in both juvenile zebra finches and adult canaries.

== Learning ==
A timeline for song learning in different species. Diagram adapted from Brainard & Doupe, 2002.

Superb lyrebird mimicking several different native Australian bird calls

Sample of the rich repertoire of the brown thrasher

The songs of different species of birds vary and are generally typical of the species. Species vary greatly in the complexity of their songs and in the number of distinct kinds of song they sing (up to 3000 in the brown thrasher); individuals within some species vary in the same way. In a few species, such as lyrebirds and mockingbirds, songs imbed arbitrary elements learned in the individual's lifetime, a form of mimicry (though maybe better called "appropriation" (Ehrlich et al.), as the bird does not pass for another species). As early as 1773, it was established that birds learned calls, and cross-fostering experiments succeeded in making linnet Acanthis cannabina learn the song of a skylark, Alauda arvensis. In many species, it appears that although the basic song is the same for all members of the species, young birds learn some details of their songs from their fathers, and these variations build up over generations to form dialects.

Song learning in juvenile birds occurs in two stages: sensory learning, which involves the juvenile listening to the father or other conspecific bird and memorizing the spectral and temporal qualities of the song (song template), and sensorimotor learning, which involves the juvenile bird producing its own vocalizations and practicing its song until it accurately matches the memorized song template.

During the sensorimotor learning phase, song production begins with highly variable sub-vocalizations called "sub-song", which is akin to babbling in human infants. Soon after, the juvenile song shows certain recognizable characteristics of the imitated adult song, but still lacks the stereotypy of the crystallized song – this is called "plastic song".

After two or three months of song learning and rehearsal (depending on species), the juvenile produces a crystallized song, characterized by spectral and temporal stereotypy (very low variability in syllable production and syllable order). Some birds, such as zebra finches, which are the most popular species for birdsong research, have overlapping sensory and sensorimotor learning stages.

Research has indicated that birds' acquisition of song is a form of motor learning that involves regions of the basal ganglia. Further, the PDP (see Neuroanatomy below) has been considered homologous to a mammalian motor pathway originating in the cerebral cortex and descending through the brain stem, while the AFP has been considered homologous to the mammalian cortical pathway through the basal ganglia and thalamus. Models of bird-song motor learning can be useful in developing models for how humans learn speech.

In some species such as zebra finches, learning of song is limited to the first year; they are termed "age-limited" or "close-ended" learners. Other species such as the canaries can develop new songs even as sexually mature adults; these are termed "open-ended" learners.

Researchers have hypothesized that learned songs allow the development of more complex songs through cultural interaction, thus allowing intraspecies dialects that help birds to identify kin and to adapt their songs to different acoustic environments.

=== Auditory feedback in birdsong learning ===
Early experiments by Thorpe in 1954 showed the importance of a bird being able to hear a tutor's song. When birds are raised in isolation, away from the influence of conspecific males, they still sing. While the song they produce, called "isolate song", resembles the song of a wild bird, it shows distinctly different characteristics from the wild song and lacks its complexity. The importance of the bird being able to hear itself sing in the sensorimotor period was later discovered by Konishi. Birds deafened before the song-crystallization period went on to produce songs that were distinctly different from the wild type and isolate song. Since the emergence of these findings, investigators have been searching for the neural pathways that facilitate sensory/sensorimotor learning and mediating the matching of the bird's own song with the memorized song template.

Several studies in the 1990s have looked at the neural mechanisms underlying birdsong learning by performing lesions to relevant brain structures involved in the production or maintenance of song or by deafening birds before and/or after song crystallization. Another experimental approach was recording the bird's song and then playing it back while the bird is singing, causing perturbed auditory feedback (the bird hears the superposition of its own song and a fragmented portion of a previous song syllable). After Nordeen & Nordeen made a landmark discovery as they demonstrated that auditory feedback was necessary for the maintenance of song in adult birds with crystallized song, Leonardo & Konishi (1999) designed an auditory feedback perturbation protocol in order to explore the role of auditory feedback in adult song maintenance further, to investigate how adult songs deteriorate after extended exposure to perturbed auditory feedback, and to examine the degree to which adult birds could recover crystallized song over time after being removed from perturbed feedback exposure. This study offered further support for role of auditory feedback in maintaining adult song stability and demonstrated how adult maintenance of crystallized birdsong is dynamic rather than static.

Brainard & Doupe (2000) posit a model in which LMAN (of the anterior forebrain) plays a primary role in error correction, as it detects differences between the song produced by the bird and its memorized song template and then sends an instructive error signal to structures in the vocal production pathway in order to correct or modify the motor program for song production. In their study, Brainard & Doupe (2000) showed that while deafening adult birds led to the loss of song stereotypy due to altered auditory feedback and non-adaptive modification of the motor program, lesioning LMAN in the anterior forebrain pathway of adult birds that had been deafened led to the stabilization of song (LMAN lesions in deafened birds prevented any further deterioration in syllable production and song structure).

Currently, there are two competing models that elucidate the role of LMAN in generating an instructive error signal and projecting it to the motor production pathway:

Bird's own song (BOS)-tuned error correction model

During singing, the activation of LMAN neurons will depend on the match between auditory feedback from the song produced by the bird and the stored song template. If this is true, then the firing rates of LMAN neurons will be sensitive to changes in auditory feedback.

Efference copy model of error correction

An efference copy of the motor command for song production is the basis of the real-time error-correction signal. During singing, activation of LMAN neurons will depend on the motor signal used to generate the song, and the learned prediction of expected auditory feedback based on that motor command. Error correction would occur more rapidly in this model.

Leonardo tested these models directly by recording spike rates in single LMAN neurons of adult zebra finches during singing in conditions with normal and perturbed auditory feedback. His results did not support the BOS-tuned error correction model, as the firing rates of LMAN neurons were unaffected by changes in auditory feedback and therefore, the error signal generated by LMAN appeared unrelated to auditory feedback. Moreover, the results from this study supported the predictions of the efference copy model, in which LMAN neurons are activated during singing by the efference copy of the motor signal (and its predictions of expected auditory feedback), allowing the neurons to be more precisely time-locked to changes in auditory feedback.

==== Mirror neurons and vocal learning ====
A mirror neuron is a neuron that discharges both when an individual performs an action and when he/she perceives that same action being performed by another. These neurons were first discovered in macaque monkeys, but recent research suggests that mirror neuron systems may be present in other animals including humans.

Song selectivity in HVCx neurons: neuron activity in response to calls heard (green) and calls produced (red). a. Neurons fire when the primary song type is either heard or sung. b, c. Neurons do not fire in response to the other song type, regardless of whether it is heard or sung.

Mirror neurons have the following characteristics:

- They are located in the premotor cortex.
- They exhibit both sensory and motor properties.
- They are action-specific – mirror neurons are only active when an individual is performing or observing a certain type of action (e.g., grasping an object).

Because mirror neurons exhibit both sensory and motor activity, some researchers have suggested that mirror neurons may serve to map sensory experience onto motor structures. This has implications for birdsong learning– many birds rely on auditory feedback to acquire and maintain their songs. Mirror neurons may be mediating this comparison of what the bird hears, how it compares to a memorized song template, and what he produces.

In search of these auditory-motor neurons, Jonathan Prather and other researchers at Duke University recorded the activity of single neurons in the HVCs of swamp sparrows. They discovered that the neurons that project from the HVC to Area X (HVC_{X} neurons) are highly responsive when the bird is hearing a playback of his own song. These neurons also fire in similar patterns when the bird is singing that same song. Swamp sparrows employ 3–5 different song types, and the neural activity differs depending on which song is heard or sung. The HVC_{X} neurons only fire in response to the presentation (or singing) of one of the songs, the primary song type. They are also temporally selective, firing at a precise phase in the song syllable.

Prather, et al. found that during the short period of time before and after the bird sings, his HVC_{X} neurons become insensitive to auditory input. In other words, the bird becomes "deaf" to his own song. This suggests that these neurons are producing a corollary discharge, which would allow for direct comparison of motor output and auditory input. This may be the mechanism underlying learning via auditory feedback. These findings are also in line with Leonardo's (2004) efference copy model of error correction in birdsong learning and production.

Overall, the HVC_{X} auditory motor neurons in swamp sparrows are very similar to the visual motor mirror neurons discovered in primates. Like mirror neurons, the HVC_{X} neurons:

- Are located in a premotor brain area
- Exhibit both sensory and motor properties
- Are action-specific – a response is only triggered by the "primary song type"

The function of the mirror neuron system is still unclear. Some scientists speculate that mirror neurons may play a role in understanding the actions of others, imitation, theory of mind and language acquisition, though there is currently insufficient neurophysiological evidence in support of these theories. Specifically regarding birds, it is possible that the mirror neuron system serves as a general mechanism underlying vocal learning, but further research is needed. In addition to the implications for song learning, the mirror neuron system could also play a role in territorial behaviors such as song-type matching and countersinging.

=== Learning through cultural transmission ===
External videos
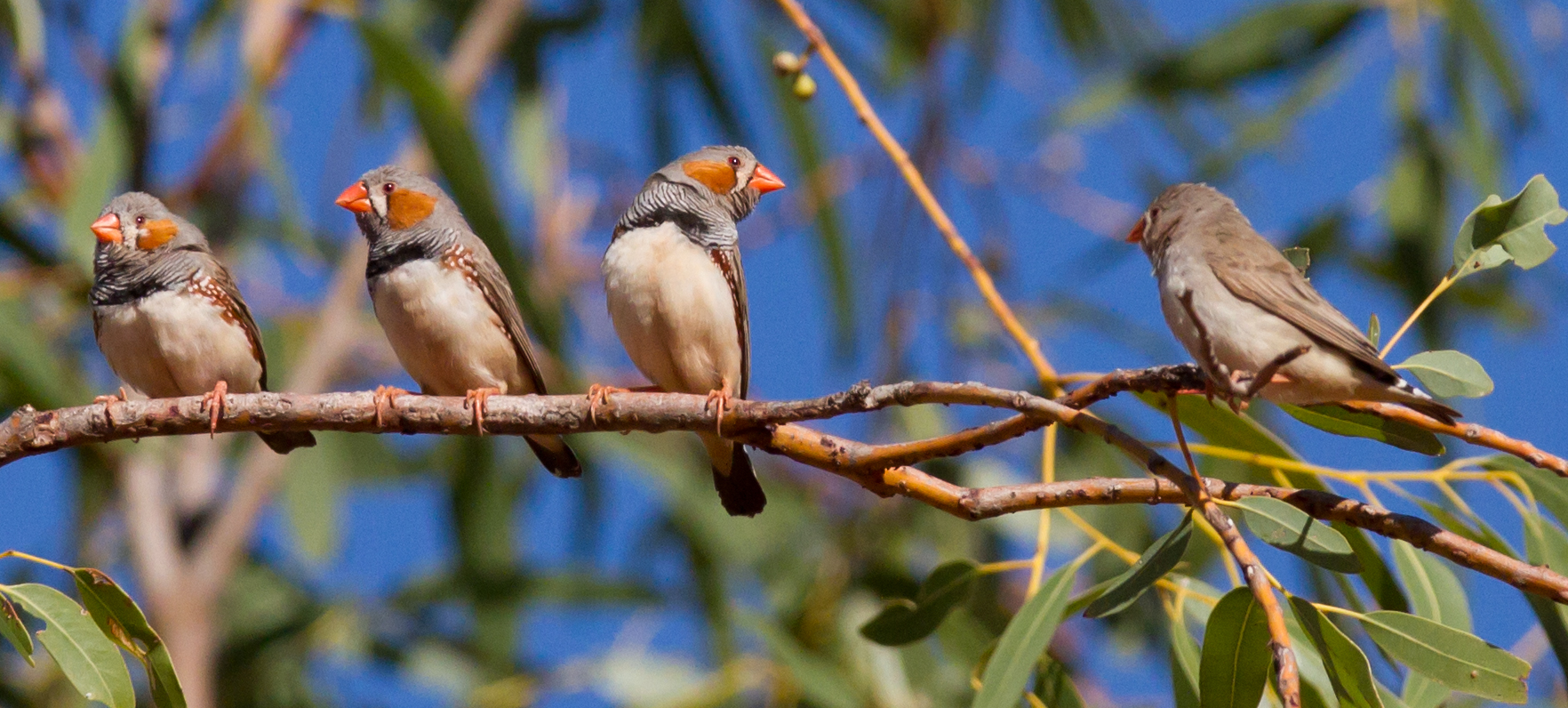
- "The cultural lives of birds", Knowable Magazine, February 26, 2022

Culture in animals is usually defined to consist of socially transmitted behavior patterns ("traditions") that are characteristic of certain populations. The learned nature of bird song as well as evidence of "dialect"-like local variations have support theories about the existence of avian culture.

As mentioned above, bird song's dependence on learning was studied by Thorpe, who found that chaffinches raised in isolation from their first week of life produce highly abnormal and less complex songs compared to other chaffinches. This suggested that many aspects of song development in songbirds depends on tutoring by older members of the same species. Later studies observed canary-like elements in the song of a chaffinch raised by canaries, evidencing the strong role of tutors in the learning of song by juvenile birds.

Similar chaffinch song types (categorized based on their distinct elements and their order) were observed to cluster in similar geographic areas, and this discovery led to hypotheses about "dialects" in birdsong. It has since been postulated that these song type variations are not dialects like those we found in human language. This is because not all members of a given geographic area will conform to the same song type, and also because there is no singular characteristic of a song type that differentiates it from all other types (unlike human dialects where certain words are unique to certain dialects).

Based on this evidence of learning and localized song types, researchers began to investigate the social learning of birdsong as a form of cultural transmission. The behavior patterns constituting this culture are the songs themselves, and the song types can be considered as traditions.

==== Dopamine circuits and cultural transmission ====
A recent study has shown that a dopamine circuit in zebra finches may promote social learning of bird song from tutors. Their data shows that certain brain areas in juvenile zebra finches are excited by the singing of conspecific tutors and not by loudspeakers playing zebra finch song. Additionally, they show that dopamine released into the HVC aids in the encoding of song.

=== Evolutionary preservation of bird vocal learning ===
==== The cultural trap hypothesis ====
Although a significant amount of research was done on bird song during the 20th century, none was able to elucidate the evolutionary "use" behind birdsong, especially with regards to large vocal repertoires. In response, Lachlan and Slater proposed a "cultural trap" model to explain persistence of wide varieties of song. This model is based on a concept of "filters", in which:

- a male songbird's (i.e. singer's) filter contains the range of songs that it can develop
- a female songbird's (i.e. receiver's) filter contains the range of songs that it finds acceptable for mate choice

In one possible situation, the population consists mainly of birds with wide filters. In this population, a male songbird with a wide filter will rarely be chosen by the few females with narrow filters (as the male's song is unlikely to fall within a narrower filter). Such females will have a relatively small choice of males to mate with, so the genetic basis of the females' narrow filter does not persist. Another possible situation deals with a population with mostly narrow filters. In the latter population, wide-filter males can feasibly avoid mate choice rejection by learning from older, narrow-filter males. Therefore, the average reproductive success of wide-filter birds is enhanced by the possibility of learning, and vocal learning and large song repertoires (i.e. wide filters) go hand-in-hand.

The cultural trap hypothesis is one example of gene-culture coevolution, in which selective pressures emerge from the interaction between genotypes and their cultural consequences.

==== Possible correlation with cognitive ability ====
Various studies have shown that adult birds that underwent stress during critical developmental periods produce less complex songs and have smaller HVC brain regions. This has led some researchers to hypothesize that sexual selection for more complex songs indirectly selects for stronger cognitive ability in males. Further investigation showed that male song sparrows with larger vocal repertoires required less time to solve detour-reaching cognitive tasks. Some have proposed that bird song (among other sexually selected traits such as flashy coloring, body symmetry, and elaborate courtship) allow female songbirds to quickly assess the cognitive skills and development of multiple males.

== Identification and systematics ==
Song of the white-throated sparrow

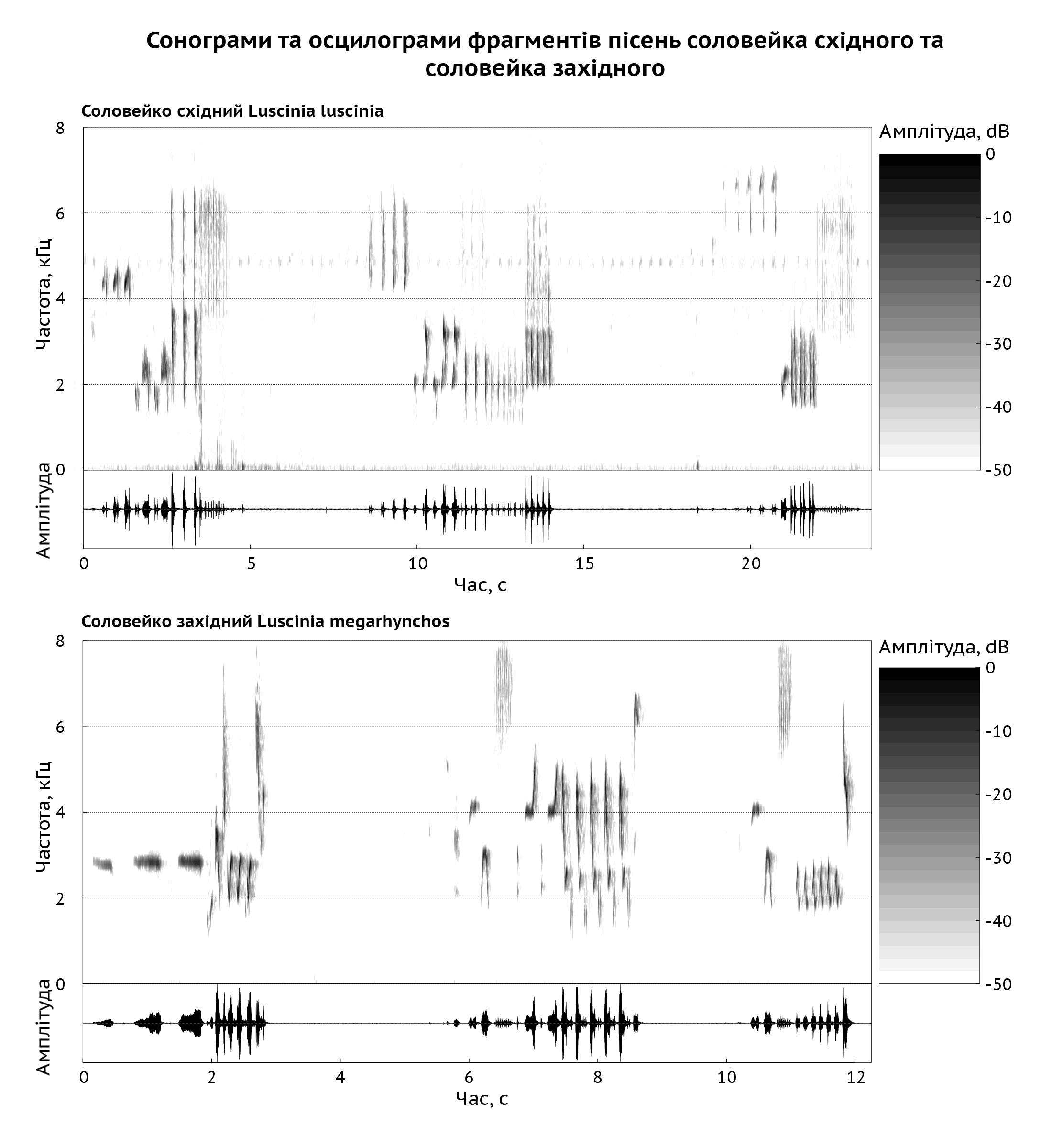
The sonograms of Luscinia luscinia and Luscinia megarhynchos singing help to distinguish these two species by voice definitely.

The specificity of bird calls has been used extensively for species identification. The calls of birds have been described using words or nonsense syllables or line diagrams. Common terms in English include words such as quack, chirp and chirrup. These are subject to imagination and vary greatly; a well-known example is the white-throated sparrow's song, given in Canada as O sweet Canada Canada Canada and in New England as Old Sam Peabody Peabody Peabody (also Where are you Frederick Frederick Frederick?). In addition to nonsense words, grammatically correct phrases have been constructed as likenesses of the vocalizations of birds. For example, the barred owl produces a motif which some bird guides describe as Who cooks for you? Who cooks for you all? with the emphasis placed on you. The term "warblish" has been coined to explain this approach to bird call description. Musical notation to depict bird sound began with Athanasius Kircher in his Musurgia universalis (1650) but more careful use was attempted with enhancements in the twentieth century by the Germans Alwin Voigt, Cornel Schmitt, and Hans Stadler.

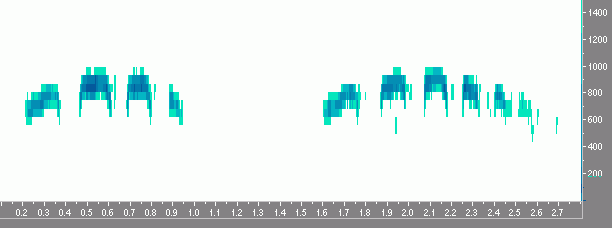
Sonogram of the call of a laughing dove. Recorded in south India

Kay Electric Company, started by former Bell Labs engineers Harry Foster and Elmo Crump, made a device that was marketed as the "Sona-Graph" in 1948. This was adopted by early researchers including C.E.G. Bailey who demonstrated its use for studying bird song in 1950. The use of spectrograms to visualize bird song was then adopted by Donald J. Borror and developed further by others including W. H. Thorpe. These visual representations are also called sonograms or sonagrams. Beginning in 1983, some field guides for birds use sonograms to document the calls and songs of birds. The sonogram is objective, unlike descriptive phrases, but proper interpretation requires experience. Sonograms can also be roughly converted back into sound.

Bird song is an integral part of bird courtship and is a pre-zygotic isolation mechanism involved in the process of speciation. Many allopatric subspecies show differences in calls. These differences are sometimes minute, often detectable only in the sonograms. Song differences in addition to other taxonomic attributes have been used in the identification of new species. The use of calls has led to proposals for splitting of species complexes such as those of the Mirafra bushlarks.

Smartphone apps can identify birds using sounds. These apps work by comparing against spectrographic databases for matches.

== Bird language ==
The language of birds has long been a topic for anecdote and speculation. That calls have meanings that are interpreted by their listeners has been well demonstrated. Domestic chickens have distinctive alarm calls for aerial and ground predators, and they respond to these alarm calls appropriately.

However, a language has, in addition to words, grammar (that is, structures and rules). Studies to demonstrate the existence of language have been difficult because of the range of possible interpretations. For instance, some have argued that in order for a communication system to count as a language it must be "combinatorial", having an open-ended set of grammar-compliant sentences made from a finite vocabulary.

Research on parrots by Irene Pepperberg is claimed to demonstrate the innate ability for grammatical structures, including the existence of concepts such as nouns, adjectives and verbs. In the wild, the innate vocalizations of black-capped chickadees have been rigorously shown to exhibit combinatorial language. Studies on starling vocalizations have also suggested that they may have recursive structures.

The term bird language may also more informally refer to patterns in bird vocalizations that communicate information to other birds or other animals in general.

Some birds have two distinct "languages" — one for internal communications and one for use in flocks. All birds have a separate type of communication for "songs" vs. communicating danger and other information. Konrad Lorenz demonstrated that jackdaws have "names" identifying each individual in the flock and when beginning flight preparations each of them says one other bird's name creating a "chain". In his book King Solomon's Ring, Lorenz describes the name he was given by the birds and how he was recognized several years later in a far away location following WWII.

Studies in parakeets have shown a striking similarity between a talking bird's verbal areas in the brain and the equivalent human brain areas, suggesting that mimicry has much to do with the construction of language and its structures and order. Research in 2016 showed that birds construct sentence-like communications with a syntax and grammar.

== In culture ==
=== Recording ===
The first known recording of birdsong was made in 1889 by the then aged eight year old Ludwig Koch, who went on to become an eminent wildlife recordist and BBC natural history presenter.

Other notable birdsong recordists include Eric Simms, Chris Watson, Boris Veprintsev, Claude Chappuis, Jean-Claude Roché, François Charron and Fernand Deroussen.

=== In music ===
In music, birdsong has influenced composers and musicians in several ways: they can be inspired by birdsong; they can intentionally imitate bird song in a composition, as Vivaldi and Beethoven did, along with many later composers, such as Messiaen; they can incorporate recordings of birds into their works, as Ottorino Respighi first did; or like Beatrice Harrison and David Rothenberg, they can duet with birds. Authors including Rothenberg have claimed that birds sing on traditional scales as used in human music, but at least one songbird does not choose notes in this way.

Among birds which habitually borrow phrases or sounds from other species, the way they use variations of rhythm, relationships of musical pitch, and combinations of notes can resemble music. Hollis Taylor's in-depth analysis of pied butcherbird vocalizations provides a detailed rebuttal to objections of birdsong being judged as music. The similar motor constraints on human and avian song may have driven these to have similar song structures, including "arch-shaped and descending melodic contours in musical phrases", long notes at the ends of phrases, and typically small differences in pitch between adjacent notes, at least in birds with a strong song structure like the Eurasian treecreeper Certhia familiaris.

=== In poetry ===
Bird song is a popular subject in poetry. Famous examples inspired by bird song include the 1177 Persian poem "The Conference of the Birds", in which the birds of the world assemble under the wisest bird, the hoopoe, to decide who is to be their king. In English poetry, John Keats's 1819 "Ode to a Nightingale" and Percy Bysshe Shelley's 1820 "To a Skylark" are popular classics. Ted Hughes's 1970 collection of poems about a bird character, "Crow", is considered one of his most important works. Bird poems by Gerard Manley Hopkins include "Sea and Skylark" and "The Windhover".

=== Human mimicry ===
In 2026 12-year-old Samuel Henderson from Choctaw, Oklahoma, who has autism, received media widespread attention for his ability to mimic up to 114 different bird calls.

== See also ==
- Animal communication
- Animal language
- Anti-exhaustion hypothesis, birdsong
- Australian Bird Calls
- Bioacoustics
- Biomusic
- Biophony
- Bird singing contest
- Birdsong in music
- Cock a doodle doo
- Dawn chorus (birds)
- Flight call
- Language of the birds
- Lateralization of bird song
- Lombard effect
- Talking bird
- Vinkensport
