= Alwin Voigt =

German school teacher and ornithologist

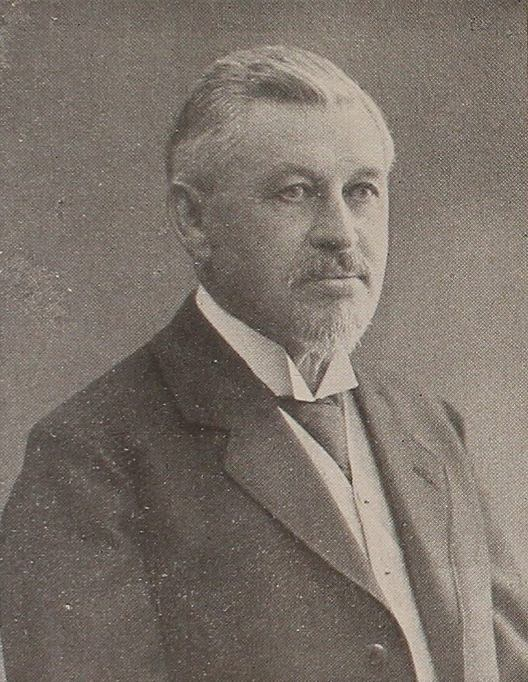

Alwin Voigt (3 June 1852 – 14 May 1922) was a German ornithologist and a popularizer of bird study. He promoted the study of bird vocalization, and in 1894 he adapted musical notation for a concise description of bird calls, with dots and lines indicating timing and frequency. Line thickness was used to depict volume.

== Life and work ==
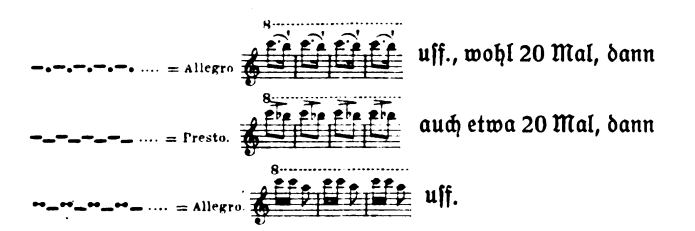
Visual depiction of Parus ater calls, 1909

Voigt was born in Commichau (Colditz) and grew up in Bohemia and like his father he trained as a teacher. After studying at the teacher training school in Grimma, he became a private tutor in Dresden. In 1877, he moved to Leipzig to work in the Petrischule and later at the 1st Realschule. He then studied natural sciences and wrote a doctoral thesis on mosses in 1892. In 1894 he published "Exkursionsbuch zum Studium der Vogelstimmen" proved popular and eight editions were published. In this work he represented bird calls using printed notations that indicated volume, pitch and timing. He also considered timbre as an importance part of the description. Editions were produced posthumously as late as 1950. This stimulated other works such as the book Die Vogelsprache (1919) by Cornel Schmitt and Hans Stadler. He also published popular books on German bird life in 1908, on songbirds in 1912, and on waterbirds in 1921.
