= Pessulus =

Anatomical term related to birds

The pessulus is a delicate bar of cartilage connecting the dorsal and ventral extremities of the first pair of bronchial cartilages in the syrinx of birds. In some birds such as Anas platyrhynchos the pessulus may be ossified.
