= Syrinx (bird anatomy) =

Vocal organ of birds

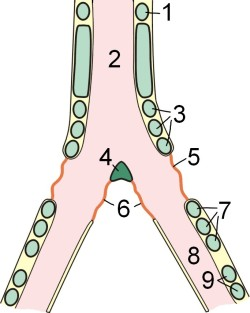
Schematic drawing of an avian syrinx 1: last free cartilaginous tracheal ring, 2: Trachea 3: first group of syringeal rings, 4: pessulus, 5: membrana tympaniformis lateralis, 6: membrana tympaniformis medialis, 7: second group of syringeal rings, 8: main bronchus, 9: bronchial cartilage

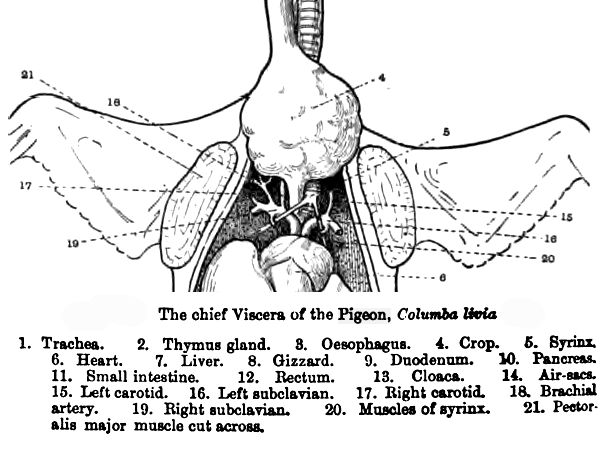
Syrinx (serial 5) seen just below the crop

The syrinx (from Ancient Greek σῦριγξ (súrinx) 'pan pipes') is the vocal organ of birds. Located at the base of a bird's trachea, it produces sounds without the vocal folds of mammals. The sound is produced by vibrations of some or all of the membrana tympaniformis (the walls of the syrinx) and the pessulus, caused by air flowing through the syrinx. This sets up a self-oscillating system that modulates the airflow creating the sound. The muscles modulate the sound shape by changing the tension of the membranes and the bronchial openings. The syrinx enables some species of birds (such as parrots, crows, and mynas) to mimic human speech.

Unlike the larynx in mammals, the syrinx is located where the trachea forks into the lungs. Thus, lateralization is possible, with muscles on the left and right branch modulating vibrations independently so that some songbirds can produce more than one sound at a time. Some species of birds, such as New World vultures, lack a syrinx and communicate through throaty hisses. Birds do have a larynx, but unlike in mammals, it does not vocalize.

The position of the syrinx, structure and musculature varies widely across bird groups. In some groups the syrinx covers the lower end of the trachea and the upper parts of the bronchi in which case the syrinx is said to be tracheobronchial, the most frequent form and the one found in all songbirds. The syrinx may be restricted to the bronchi as in some non-passerines, notably the owls, cuckoos and nightjars. The syrinx may also be restricted to the trachea and this is found in a very small number of bird groups that are sometimes known as Tracheophonae, a subset of the suboscine passeriformes that includes Furnariidae (ovenbirds), Dendrocolaptidae (woodcreepers), Formicariidae (ground antbirds), Thamnophilidae (typical antbirds), Rhinocryptidae (tapaculos), and Conopophagidae (gnateaters).

The trachea are covered in partly ossified rings known as tracheal rings. Tracheal rings tend to be complete, while the bronchial rings are C-shaped and the unossified part has smooth muscles running along them. The trachea are usual circular or oval in cross section in most birds but are flattened in ibises. The trachea is simple and tubular in ducks. The last few tracheal rings and the first few bronchial rings may fuse to form what is called the tympanic box. At the base of the trachea and at the joint of the bronchi a median dorsoventral structure, the pessulus, may be developed to varying extents. The pessulus is bony in passerines and provides attachment to membranes, anteriorly to the semilunar membranes. The membrane that forms part of the first three bronchial rings is responsible for vibrating and producing the sound in most passerines. These membranes may also be attached to the pessulus. In some species like the hill-myna, Gracula religiosa, there is wide gap between the second and third bronchial semirings where large muscles are attached, allowing the inner diameter to be varied widely. Other muscles are also involved in syringeal control, these can be intrinsic or extrinsic depending on whether they are within the syrinx or attached externally. The extrinsic muscles include the sternotrachealis from the sternum.

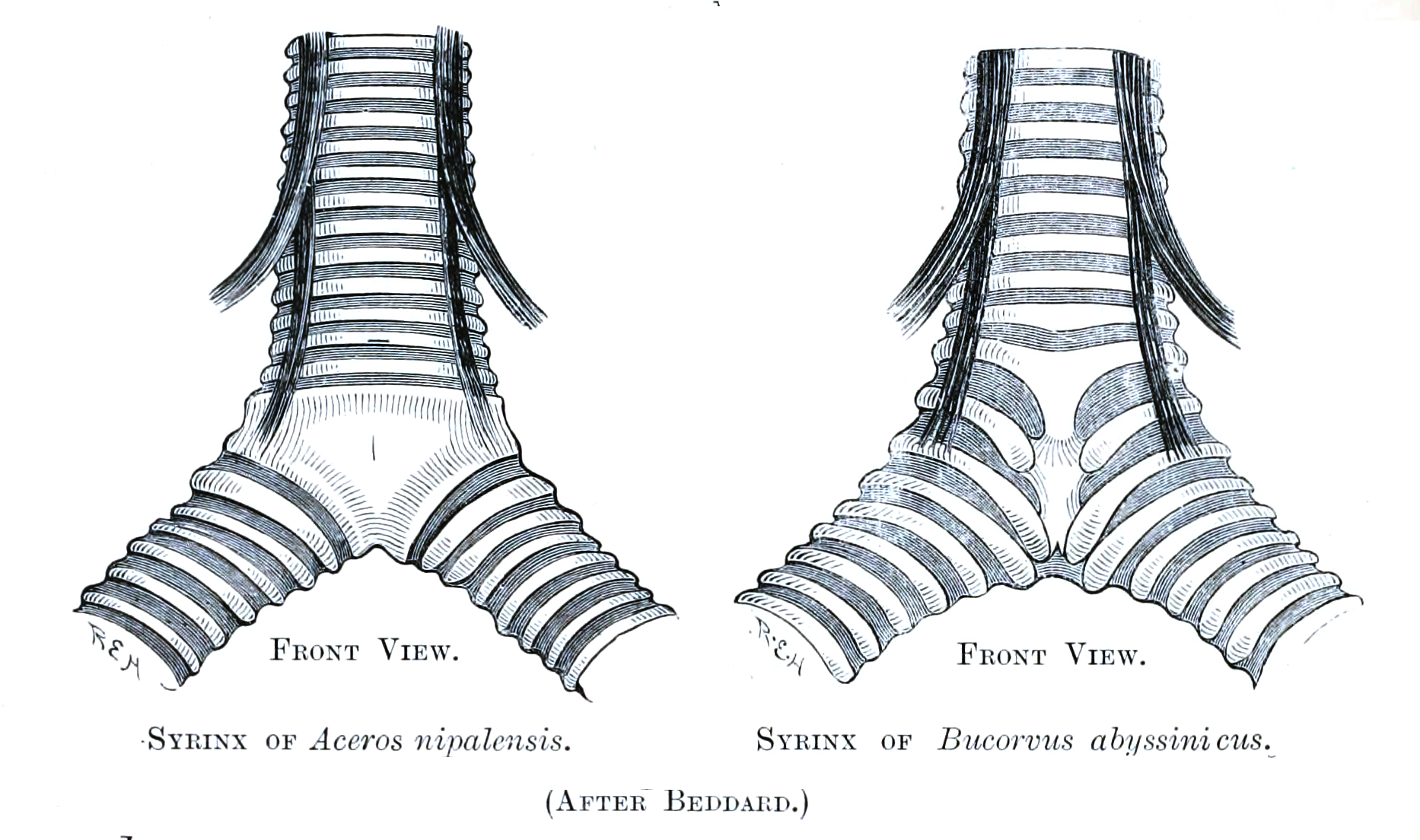
The syrinx of hornbills

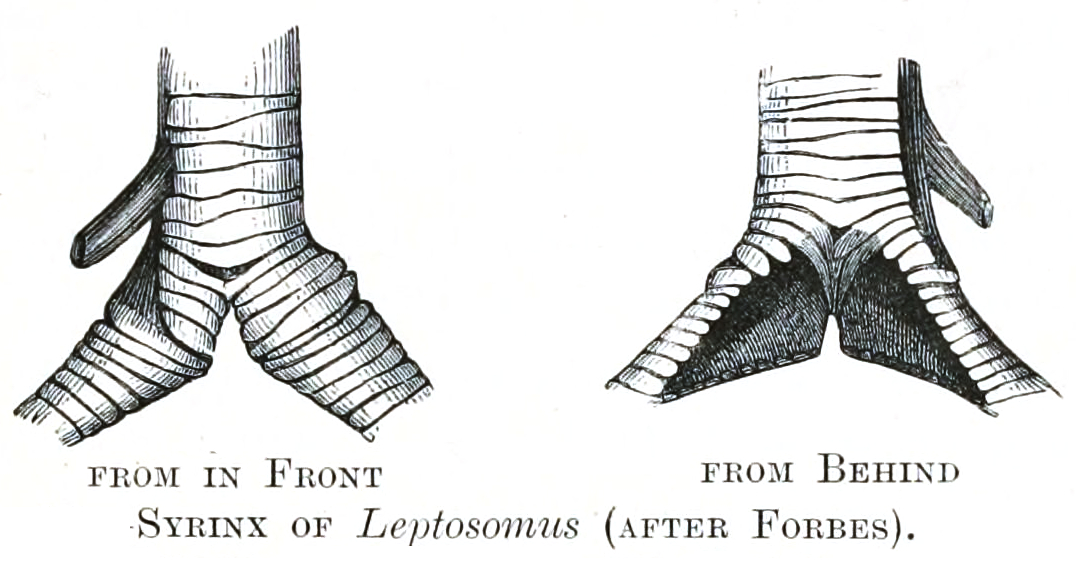
The cuckoo roller

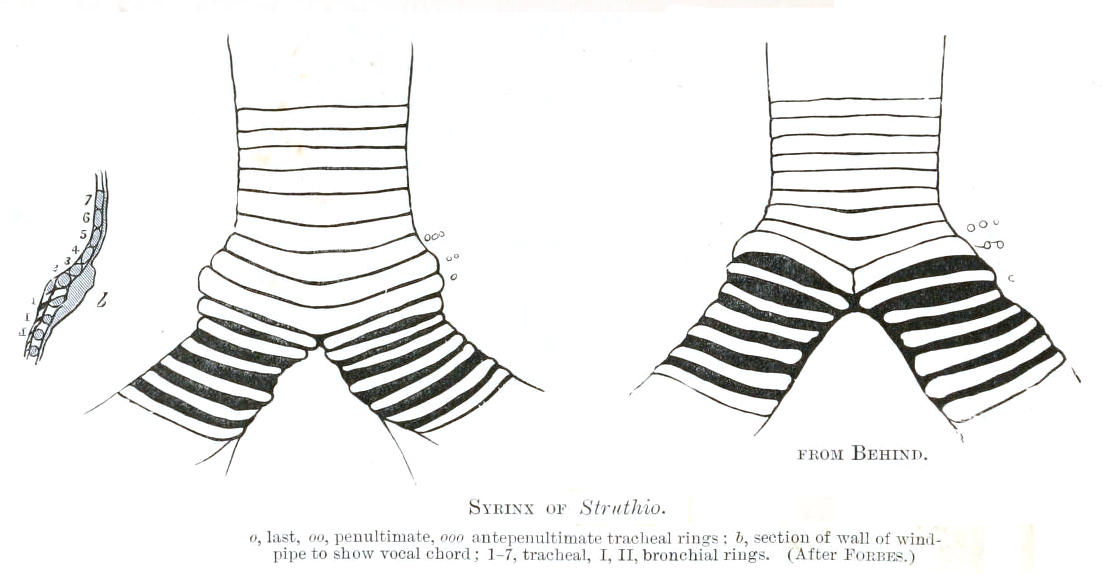
The ostrich

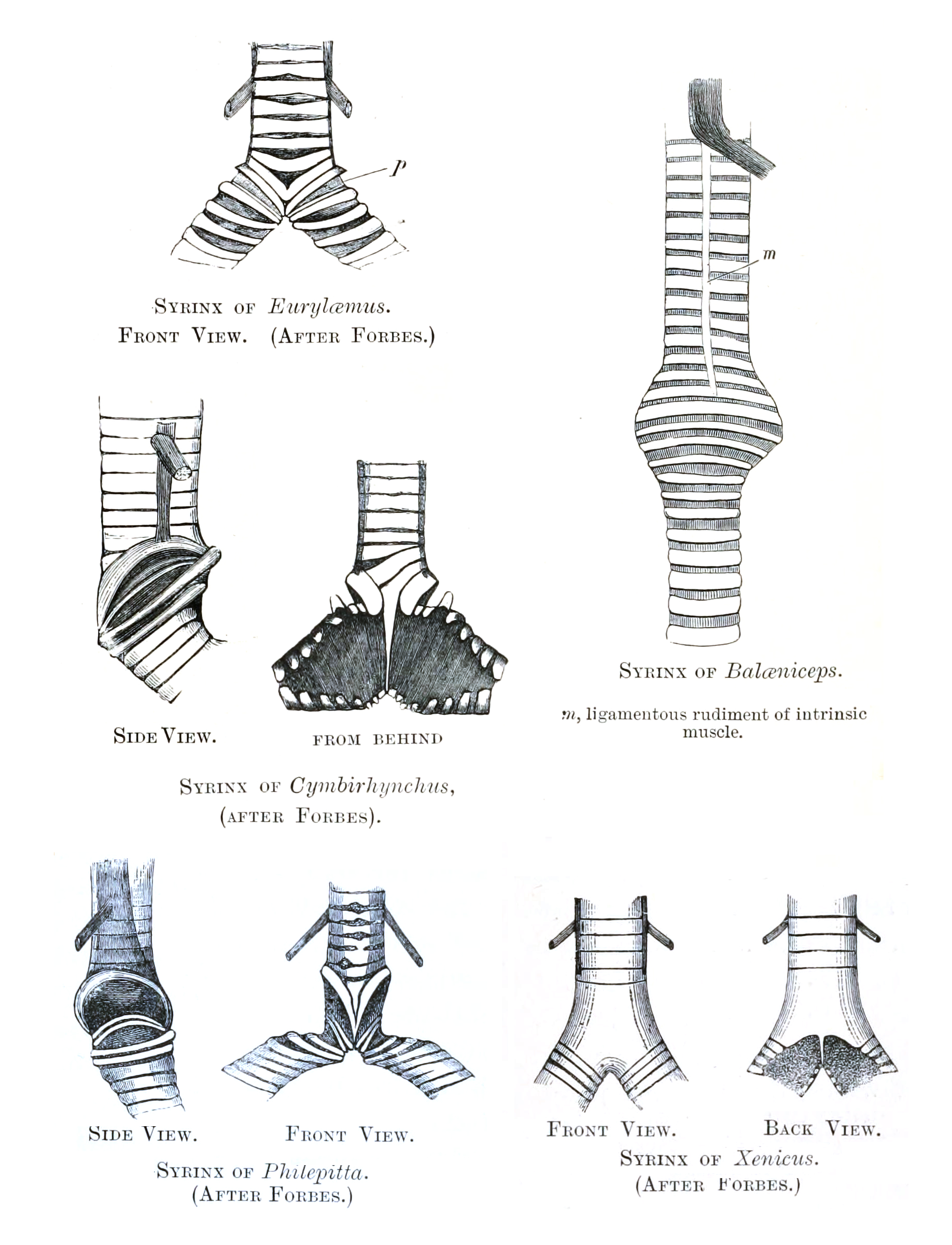
Suboscines and a shoebill

== Evolution of the syrinx ==
=== An evolutionary timeline ===
Within the avian stem lineage, the transition from a larynx-based sound source to a tracheobronchial syrinx occurred within Dinosauria, at or before the origin of Aves. The earliest fossilized record of syringeal remains is from a single specimen of Vegavis iaai from the same epoch. Before this discovery, syringeal components were thought to enter the fossil record infrequently, making it difficult to determine when the shift in vocal organs occurred. An intact specimen from the late Cretaceous, however, highlights the fossilization potential of the ancestral structure and may indicate that the syrinx is a late-arising feature in avian evolution.

There is uncertainty about the relationship between the larynx and syrinx during this morphological shift, but there are two predominant evolutionary possibilities: regimes unrelated to sound production could have led to the loss in vocal function of the larynx. A new structure, the syrinx, then arose after selection for acoustic function. Conversely, the larynx could have retained some vocal capabilities, though at a diminished capacity. The syrinx then evolved to supplement sound production, which would have been followed by the loss of the larynx as a sound source. The former scenario would have led to a "silent" period in the evolution of avian ancestors. The current fossil record does not provide definitive evidence for whether the function of the larynx was lost before the syrinx was gained.

The fossil record does, however, provide clues for the evolutionary timeline of some syringeal elements. For example, increased mineralization at the tracheobronchial juncture is likely a late-arising feature in avian evolution. Despite new discoveries of preserved avian tracheobronchial rings from the Cenozoic, these structures have not been recovered from Mesozoic archosaurs. This might be a product of weak mineralization in the bronchi and trachea of Mesozoic archosaurs, a condition which would inhibit preservation potential. Thus, a shift towards a mineralized structure may have been preceded by many key avian adaptations, including respiratory shifts, increases in metabolic rates, and feather ornamentation.

=== Evolutionary causation ===
The archosaurian shift from larynx to syrinx must have conferred a selective advantage for crown birds, but the causes for this shift remain unknown. To complicate matters, the syrinx falls into an unusual category of functional evolution: arising from ancestors with a larynx-based sound source, the syrinx contains significant functional overlap with the structure it replaced. In fact, there is no evidence that an original, simplified syrinx could produce calls with a larger frequency range or longer or louder calls than an alligator-like larynx, which would have potentially increased fitness.

==== Selection for tracheobronchial support ====
While the evidence is limited, selection for non-acoustic characteristics, such as structural support and respiratory function, may have contributed to the evolution of a syrinx-like structure at the tracheobronchial juncture.

Due to airway bifurcation, the tracheobronchial juncture was present at the origin of multiple lungs in tetrapods. In bird-lineage archosaurs with bifurcated airways, the evolution of an increased metabolic rate and continuous breathing exposed airway walls to altered amounts of wall shear stress, a measure of friction between a fluid and a vessel wall. In continuous breathers, such as birds and mammals, the trachea is exposed to fluctuations of wall shear stress during inspiration and expiration. In simulations with a simplified airway conducted by Kingsley et al. (2018), fluctuations in flow patterns led to localized wall shear stress, with the highest stress during exhalation at the tracheobronchial juncture. Localized stress may have provided selective pressure for an airway support located at the tracheobronchial juncture to maintain airway patency. Understanding whether these forces would have favored the evolution of soft tissue or cartilage requires further experimentation.

Continuous breathing alone, however, would not have provided enough pressure for the development of the novel syrinx. Mammals also respire through continuous breathing, yet they did not evolve the novel structure. Additional structural components must therefore be considered in syrinx evolution. Body size, relative neck length, and larynx position relative to the hyoid apparatus (i.e. the bones that suspend the tongue and larynx) are all known to have changed across Dinosauria evolution. Coupled with respiratory shifts, these characteristics may have favored syrinx evolution in birds. Distinct airway geometries in Mammalia and Archosauria may have also impacted syrinx evolution: the bronchi in crocodiles and humans, for example, diverge at different angles.

==== Selection for musculature ====
Additionally, syrinx musculature was necessarily selected for maintaining respiratory function. Because sound is produced through the interaction of airflow and the self-oscillation of membranes within the trachea, a mechanism is necessary to abduct structures from the airway to allow for non-vocal respiration. Because of this, vibratory tissue precursors must have, at most, briefly predated the attachment of the first muscles to the trachea to clear the airway for respiratory function. Therefore, the two pairs of extrinsic muscles present in the ancestral syrinx were likely selected to ensure that the airway did not collapse during non-vocal respiration.

Further fossil data and taxonomical comparisons will be necessary to determine whether structural modifications of the syrinx unrelated to sound, such as respiratory support during continuous breathing or in flight, were exapted in the development of a vocal organ. Additionally, further research on tetrapod tracheas is necessary to understand potential constraints in the evolution of unique airway morphologies.

==== Selection for vocal efficiency ====
While a need for structural support may have given rise to an organ at the tracheobronchial juncture, selection for vocal performance likely played a role in syrinx evolution. Riede et al. (2019) argue that because birds with deactivated syringeal muscles can breathe without difficulty within a lab setting, vocal pressures must have been central to the morphological shift. Though these experiments do not account for the role of the syrinx in more metabolically challenging behaviors, such as flight, Reide et al. put forth a compelling theory about the selection for the syrinx in response to increased vocal efficiency.

This theory involves vocal tract length and the dynamics of airflow. While both the larynx and the syrinx produce sound through the interaction of airflow and self-oscillating valves, the syrinx is located deeper in the respiratory tract than the larynx. This is a critical distinction between the structures, as the length of the air column above and below a sound source affects the way energy is conveyed from airflow to oscillating tissue. The longer and narrower the tube, the greater the inertance (i.e. the "sluggishness" of air) and the easier it is to produce sound.

Inertance must be considered alongside frequency—when a tube is lengthened beyond a quarter wavelength, standing waves interfere with sound production. Thus, acoustic theory predicts that to maximize energy transfer, birds must develop an appropriate length-frequency combination that produces inertance at the input of the trachea. In songbirds, this is achieved by matching fundamental frequency with the first vocal tract resonance. Using physical and computational models, Riede et al. discovered that because of the dynamics between inertance and tracheal length, a structure in the syringeal position can be significantly more efficient than a structure in the laryngeal position.

Efficiency, however, is influenced significantly by non-linear interactions of trachea length, phonation threshold pressure, and frequency. Riede et al. therefore conclude that the evolution of a simple syrinx may be tied to specific combinations of vocal fold morphology and body size. Before the origin of Aves and during the late Jurassic period, theropod-lineage dinosaurs underwent stature miniaturization and rapid diversification. It is possible that during these changes, certain co mbinations of body-size dependent vocal tract length and sound frequencies favored the evolution of the novel syrinx.

==== The evolution of neck length and sexual selection ====
Diversification in theropod stature may explain why birds alone capitalized on the efficiency of the novel structure. Importantly, birds generally have longer necks than mammals. This distinction is due to the unidirectional flow of the avian respiratory system, which increases efficiency of gas exchange. Efficiency permits more "dead space" within the avian trachea, allowing the trachea to lengthen without a subsequent decrease in tracheal diameter. With a longer trachea, the avian vocal system shifted to a range in which an overlap between fundamental frequency and first tracheal resonance was possible. Without the critical tracheal length, mammals were unable to achieve an ideal length-frequency tracheal combination. At this point in avian evolution, it may have become advantageous to move the vocal structure upstream to the syringeal position, near the tracheobronchial juncture.

Selection for long necks, while highly variable, is often driven by beneficial feeding adaptations. Specifically, long necks facilitate underwater predation, evident in, for example, swans and cormorants. Longer necks likely predisposed Aves for syrinx evolution. Because of the correlation between neck length and tracheal length, birds are considered to have an "acoustically long trachea." Technically, this refers to a tube where the lowest resonant frequency of a vibrating object (i.e. the syrinx) is four times longer than the length of the tube. A shorter tube would be less efficient; a longer tube would cause wave-form skewing. In most mammalian species and their therapsid ancestors, tracheal length was not sufficient to facilitate a boost in vocal efficiency.

With bolstered vocal efficiency due to longer necks, the syrinx may have been retained in Aves by sexual selective forces. Acoustic communication is essential for courtship, territorial defense, and long-range communication, all of which greatly impact an organism's fitness. For example, polygynous birds with leklike mating systems have evolved to use louder sounds and a wider range of frequencies during displays; wood warblers with higher trill performance have higher fitness. While the specific acoustic advantage of the ancestral syrinx remains speculative, it is evident from modern avian diversification that sexual selection often drives vocal evolution.

== Sexual dimorphism ==
Sexual dimorphism leads to different syrinxes in birds, and the degree of differences varies. Some species do not present differences between sexes while others, like the mallard (Anas platyrhynchos), have distinctly different syrinxes between males and females. This difference is significant given that sexing birds is difficult at younger stages. Birds that exhibit sexual dimorphism in the syrinx can present itself at around 10 days in Pekin ducks (Anas platyrhynchos domestica).

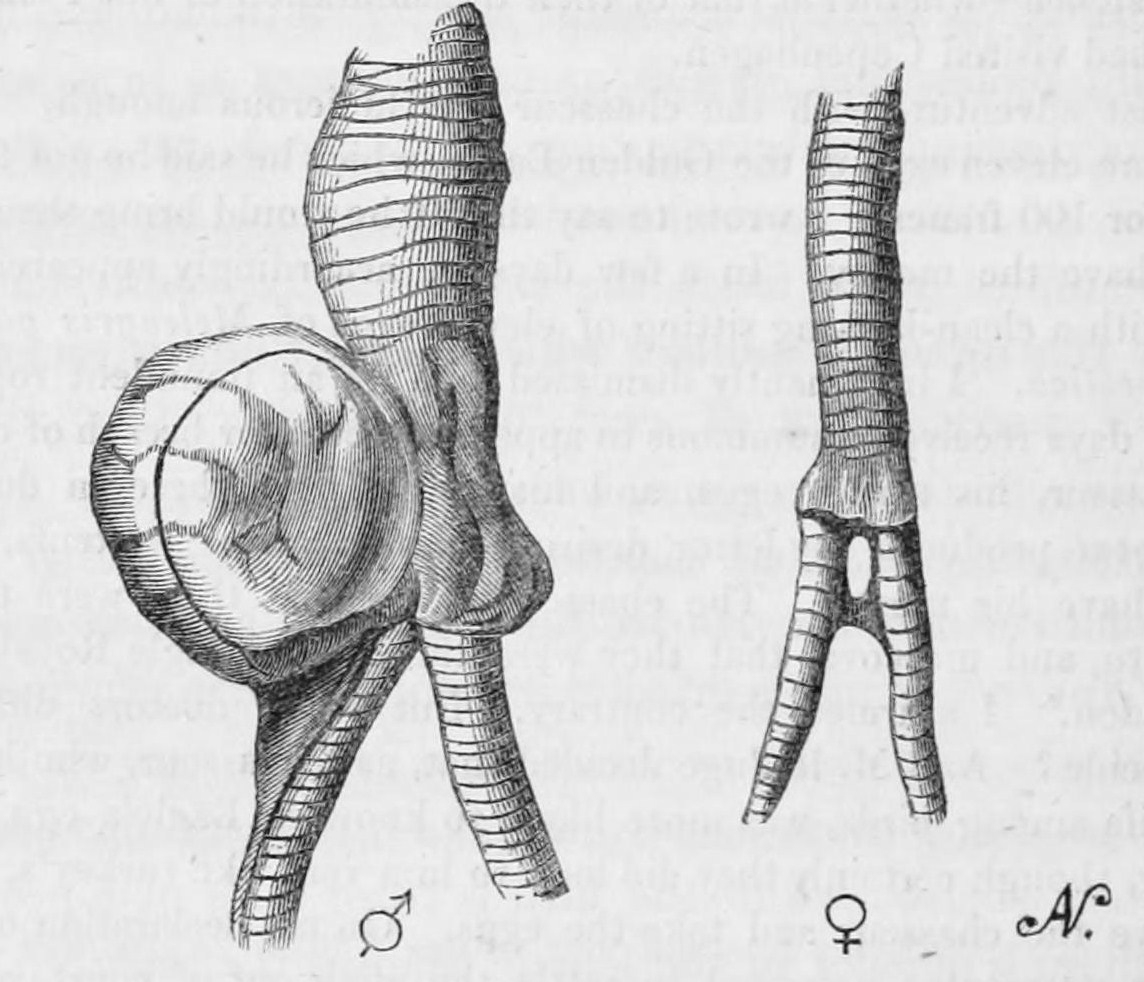
Large bulla in a male (left) and smaller bulla structure in a female (right).

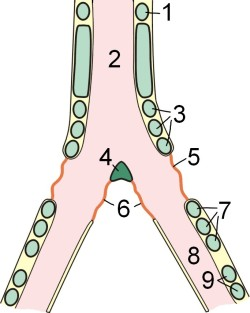
1: last free cartilaginous tracheal ring, 2: tympanum, 3: first group of syringeal rings, 4: pessulus, 5: membrana tympaniformis lateralis, 6: tympaniformis medialis, 7: second group of syringeal rings, 8: main bronchus, 9: bronchial cartilage.

Male ducks have a large tracheal bulla (bulla syringealis), whereas females have a smaller sized bulla. There are multiple key differences that distinguishes a male's syrinx from a female's. Males have a large bulla located on the left side of the trachea, and the tracheosyringeal rings that line the trachea are thicker in male mallards than in females. Within the trachea there is a structure called the pessulus that divides the trachea in half where the two bronchus branch out. The pessulus is ossified, and lined with tympaniform membranes that influence the sound production depending on its thickness when the air runs past the pessulus, causing vibrations. The membranes in males are thick and nontransparent, but the females have thinner, sheer membranes.

The nature of the sounds produced by males and females are different due to these differences in the syrinx. Females have a louder call because the space inside their bulla is not lined with a lot of fat or connective tissue, and the thinner tympaniform membrane takes less effort to vibrate. This decreases the force absorbed from the air moving through the syrinx, making a louder, higher pitched sound. On the other hand, males have a lot of fat and connective tissue in their bulla, which absorbs much more power from the moving air. This coupled with their thicker membranes leads to less vibrations and a duller, lower pitched sound.

== See also ==
- Bird call
- Talking bird
- Whistling
