= Lateralization of bird song =

Passerine birds produce song through the vocal organ, the syrinx, which is composed of bilaterally symmetric halves located where the trachea separates into the two bronchi. Using endoscopic techniques, it has been observed that song is produced by air passing between a set of medial and lateral labia on each side of the syrinx. Song is produced bilaterally, in both halves, through each separate set of labia unless air is prevented from flowing through one side of the syrinx. Birds regulate the airflow through the syrinx with muscles—M. syringealis dorsalis and M. tracheobronchialis dorsalis—that control the medial and lateral labia in the syrinx, whose action may close off airflow. Song may, hence, be produced unilaterally through one side of the syrinx when the labia are closed in the opposite side.

== Early experiments discover lateralization ==
Lateral dominance of the hypoglossal nerve conveying messages from the brain to the syrinx was first observed in the 1970s. This lateral dominance was determined in a breed of canary, the waterschlager canary, bred for its long and complex song, by lesioning the ipsilateral tracheosyringeal branch of the hypoglossal nerve, disabling either the left or right syrinx. The numbers of song elements in the birds’ repertoires were greatly attenuated when the left side was cut, but only modestly attenuated when the right side was disabled, indicating left syringeal dominance of song production in these canaries. Similar lateralized effects have been observed in other species such as the white-crowned sparrow (Zonotrichia leucophrys), the Java sparrow (Lonchura oryzivora) and the zebra finch (Taeniopygia guttata), which is right-side dominant. However, denervation in these birds does not entirely silence the affected syllables but creates qualitative changes in phonology and frequency.

== Respiratory control and neurophysiology ==
In waterslager canaries, which produce most syllables using the left syrinx, as soon as a unilaterally produced syllable finishes, the right side opens briefly to allow inspiratory airflow through both bronchi before being closed again for left syrinx song production. During this “mini-breath” the left side may remain partially or fully adducted, allowing less inspiratory airflow than the right side while remaining ready to quickly resume singing.

When bilateral airflow and subsyringeal air sac pressure were monitored along with electromyographic activity of expiratory abdominal muscles in brown thrashers (Toxostoma rufum), it was observed that during unilateral production of song, expiratory abdominal muscle activity was the same on both sides. This indicates that while inspiration and syringeal song control may be lateralized, motor control of respiratory muscles possibly remains bilateral.

Muscles of the syrinx are controlled by the tracheosyringeal branch of the hypoglossal nerve. Each syringeal half is ipsilaterally innervated by the hypoglossal motor nucleus (XIIts) in the brain, which in turn receives projections—mainly ipsilateral—from nucleus robustus (RA), an important song control nucleus that also regulates respiratory muscles. Laterality of song control has been observed all the way into the higher vocal center (HVC) brain region; unilateral lesions to HVC produce lateralized effects in the temporal patterning of song in the zebra finch. See also Bird song: Neuroanatomy

== Species-specific examples ==
=== Canary (Serinus canaria) ===
The waterschlager canary is the most robust example of unilateral syringeal dominance, creating song of which 90% of the syllables are produced by the left syrinx, as determined by recording respiratory pressure and airflow through each side during singing. Waterschlager canaries with left tracheosyringeal nerve cuts are only able to produce up to 26% of the pre-operation syllable repertoire. The waterschlager canary strain is conspecific to the domestic canary but has been inbred by humans for its beautiful song. The outbred domestic canary, however, does not exhibit the strong lateralization of the waterschlager canary. Possibly explaining their strong left lateralization, canaries of the waterschlager strain contain an inherited auditory defect that decreases their sensitivity by up to 40 dB to sounds higher than 2 kHz, which are produced mainly by the right side of the syrinx.

=== Brown-headed cowbird (Molothrus ater) ===
The brown-headed cowbird produces very rapid clusters of notes that alternate in frequency, with the right syrinx producing the high frequency notes and the left syrinx producing low frequency notes. The entire cluster is sung during a single respiratory expiration, called "pulsatile expiration", in which no inflow of air occurs between notes. By alternating note production successively between each side of the syrinx and without ceasing expiration, a cowbird is able to rapidly and abruptly switch the frequency of notes back and forth between high and low frequencies. To see a cartoon of how syllables are produced in alternate sides of the syrinx, click here

=== Northern cardinal (Cardinalis cardinalis) ===
Northern cardinals contain FM sweep syllables as part of their repertoire that begin around 6 or 7 kHz and sweep downward continuously to 2 kHz. Each of these syllables is sung unilaterally. However, the cardinal switches mid-syllable from employing the right syrinx at the high frequency beginning of the sweep to the left syrinx at the lower frequency end. This switch usually occurs when the sweep reaches the 3.5 to 4.0 kHz range. The transition is abrupt yet timed so precisely that neither sonograms nor audition can detect the switch. To see a cartoon of how the syrinx produces cardinal song, click here.

=== Northern mockingbird (Mimus polyglottus) ===
Because the mockingbird has the ability to mimic the songs of other species, it has been useful in determining whether the vocal motor patterns employed by particular species in producing their unique song types are constrained by acoustic properties or whether the unique song types may also be produced by different motor patterns generated by the same songbird vocal system. When juvenile mockingbirds were tutored with the recorded or synthesized song of a cardinal or cowbird, the mockingbirds employed the same respiratory and lateralized vocal pattern as the original species to produce its mimicked song. When the mockingbird motor pattern differed from the tutor motor pattern, the song output also differed, suggesting that the vocal motor pattern is largely determined by the acoustic restraints of the song type.

Even though the mockingbird was able to mimic the FM sweeps of cardinals by employing the same motor pattern—switching mid-syllable from right syrinx to left syrinx—the mockingbird did not perform the transition seamlessly. This indicates that precise unilateral control of song production in the syrinx of certain birds, such as cardinals, has allowed them to become unique vocal specialists.

== Possible functions ==
Because the lateralized control of songs of certain species, such as cardinals, demands such precision in motor control, the ability to produce high-quality, seamless syllables may provide an indicator of fitness to potential mates. Supporting this hypothesis, certain syllables called "sexy syllables" sung by male canaries at high frequency are more effective than others in eliciting sexual displays from females. These particular syllables all contain two notes that are sung alternately by each side of the syrinx. Thus, control of the rapid switching from one side of the syrinx to the other is required to produce these attractive syllables.

Lateralization also allows for rapid and abrupt frequency changes. Studies of mockingbirds mimicking tone pairs in which the first tone was either higher or lower than a median tone of 2 kHz (either side is capable of producing this median tone) revealed that alternating sides of the syrinx for each note was necessary to reproduce them correctly. Correct mimicking was performed by singing the first syllable with the appropriate side of the syrinx—right for a high frequency tone and left for low frequency—and the second median tone with the opposite side. When the same side was used for both tones, the step-wise frequency change between the tones became slurred, suggesting that lateralization allows for abrupt frequency changes in song.

== See also ==
- Syrinx (bird anatomy)
- Bird vocalization
- Lateralization of brain function
- Animal communication
- Bioacoustics
