= Boris Veprintsev =

Boris Nikolaevich Veprintsev (Russian: Борис Николаевич Вепринцев; 4 April 1928 – 11 April 1990) was a Russian biophysicist and ornithologist who specialized in the study of bird calls. He established and built up a large library of bird calls, many of which were published as LPs including several in the series known as the "Birds of the USSR". His professional area of research was however in biophysics particularly on cell membrane structure and transport. In his later years, he worked on the cryopreservation of animal genetic material.

== Life and work ==
Veprintsev was born in Moscow to Nikolai Alexandrovich and Zinaida Mikhailovna. His father was a revolutionary and was arrested in 1932 and exiled to Barnaul but was allowed to return in 1940 in Livny due to illness and died a year later in Morshansk. His mother had been ordered to leave Moscow but stayed on thanks to the intervention of a family friend. As a young boy, Veprintsev joined a circle of young biology students at Moscow Zoo (KYuBZ). Here, at the age of twelve, he heard the recordings of birds made by Ludwig Koch and others played at the end of a talk by A.N. Promptov. He spent time with his paternal uncle Pyotr, an X ray technician in Ferghana in 1941 and here he influenced his cousin Igor who became a sound engineer. He however went on to study biology at Moscow State University in 1947. His teachers included A. N. Formozov and L. V. Krushinsky (1911-1984).

=== The Great Purge ===
Veprintsev was arrested by the MGB in 1951, while still a student, under articles 17-58-8, 58–10, and sent for 10 years to labor camp. It is believed that the authorities suspected him of hiding his father (whose death they did not know of). His father had been a revolutionary alongside Joseph Stalin in Baku and had known of Stalin's chequered past, which likely made him a target as part the Great purge. He was sent to Butyrskaya prison, Kamyshlag, and later in camps near Omsk. Leonid Krushinsky, his professor of biology managed to send packages of food and books to Veprintsev, including Haeckel and De Beer's Experimental Embryology and Lotka's Mathematical Biophysics.

=== Rehabilitation and academic career ===
Veprintsev was released after Stalin's death and rehabilitated in 1954. He then returned to studies in biophysics and graduated in 1956 and defended a thesis on electrical impulses in the nerve endings at varying temperatures in 1961. He then joined an institute of biophysics at Puschino which he headed from 1964 working on biophysics instruments and techniques. In 1971 he received his doctorate for studies on the role of the cell membrane in RNA synthesis. He became a professor in 1975. He also took an interest in cryopreservation of species, spending the last two decades on the freezing of eggs, embryos and sperms of animals with the aim of saving and reviving them.

=== Bird sound ===
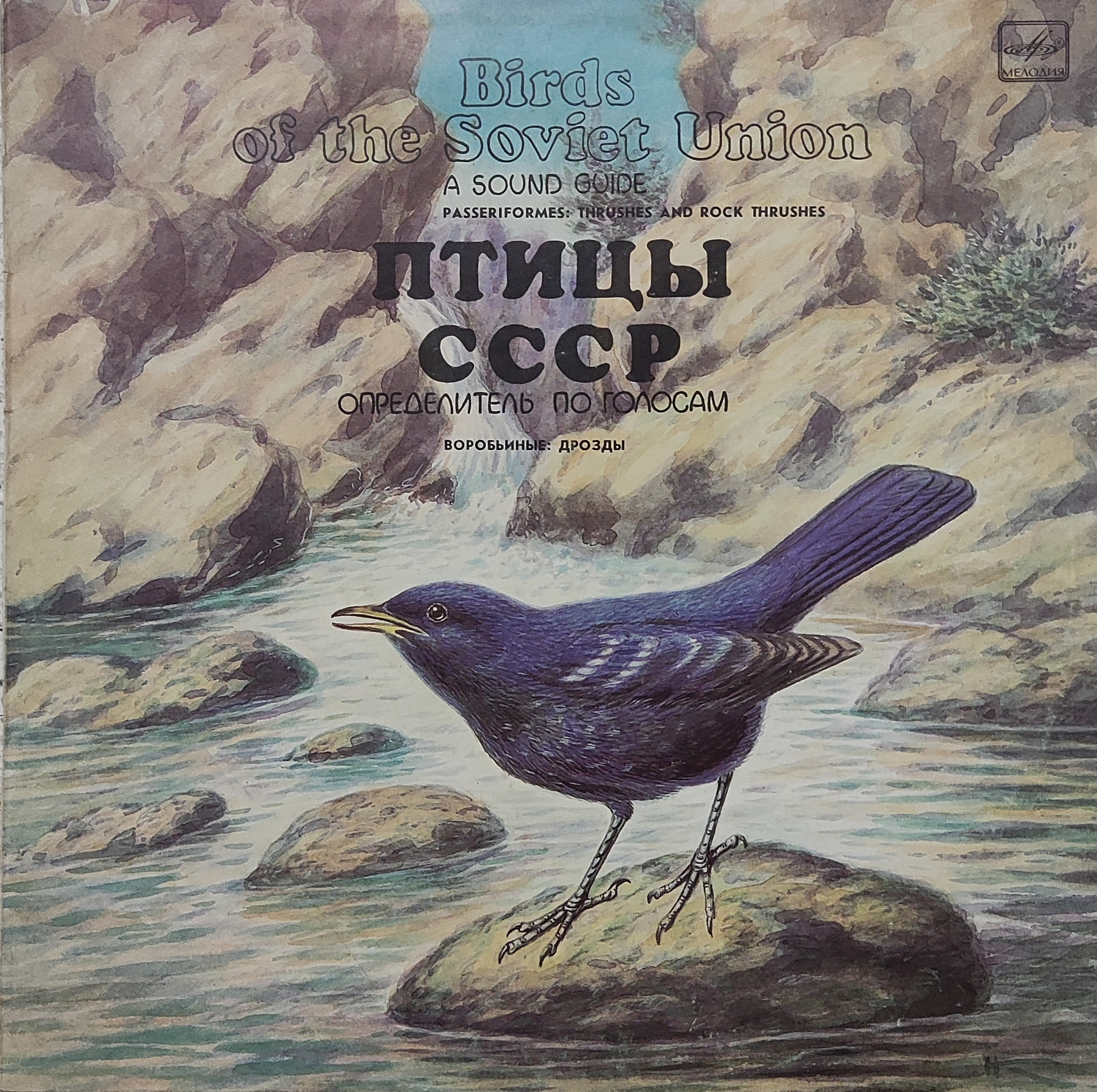
Sleeve of LP on the birds of the USSR with recordings made by Veprintsev

Veprintsev made his own first bird call recording as a student of biophysics at the Zvenigorod Biological Station. The recording instruments most of which he built on his own around 1955 weighed 30 kg and needed large batteries to be carried into the field. He was encouraged to continue his studies on bird sounds by G. P. Dementiev. He subsequently used a Reporter-2 tape recorder on loan from Moscow State University. His recordings were played at a meeting of ornithologists in 1959 and Veprintsev was interviewed by Jeffrey Boswall for the BBC. The same year, the Ministry of Culture asked him to prepare bird recordings for producing records. This project had been proposed by Pavel Barto (1904-1986). In 1960 an LP of 20 species of birds from the Moscow Region was produced by the studio with editing by A.N. Kachalina and director B. D. Vladimirsky. He then began to make trips across the Soviet Union, sometimes accompanied by the ornithologist Vladimir Vladimirovich Leonovich (1924-1998). He made his first stereo recordings in 1963 in the Taiga. He began to use a parabolic reflector from 1968, his first one received from Jean-Claude Roche. He continued recording for the rest of his life. From 1982 he was involved in the producing of 7 LP records published by Melodiya and meant to parallel the Birds of the USSR series of books. The series covered 175 bird species although 25 LP records were originally planned. He helped established the "phonoteka" or library of wildlife sounds in Puschino-on-Oka near Moscow. He collaborated with others ornithologists including Jeffrey Boswall and Jean-Claude Roche. The database of recordings that he established was named as the Veprintsev library of animal sounds in 1997.
