= Anti-exhaustion hypothesis =

Theory of birdsong

The anti-exhaustion hypothesis is a possible explanation for the existence of large repertoires and the song switching behaviour exhibited in birds. This hypothesis states that muscle exhaustion occurring due to repeating song bouts can be avoided by switching to a different song in the bird's repertoire. The anti-exhaustion hypothesis therefore predicts that birds with larger repertoires are less susceptible to exhaustion because they can readily change the song that they are producing.

The anti-exhaustion hypothesis was first proposed by Marcel Lambrechts and André Dhondt in 1988 after they carried out a study using recordings from great tits, Parus major, during the dawn chorus. There have been several studies carried out in which results have contradicted the anti-exhaustion hypothesis. Recent studies have shown that there is no evidence that the anti-exhaustion hypothesis is the cause of large repertoires in birds. Since the proposal of the anti-exhaustion hypothesis, several hypotheses have been proposed to explain the existence of repertoires and song switching behaviour in birds, including the motivation hypothesis and the warm-up hypothesis.

== Anti-exhaustion hypothesis in great tits ==
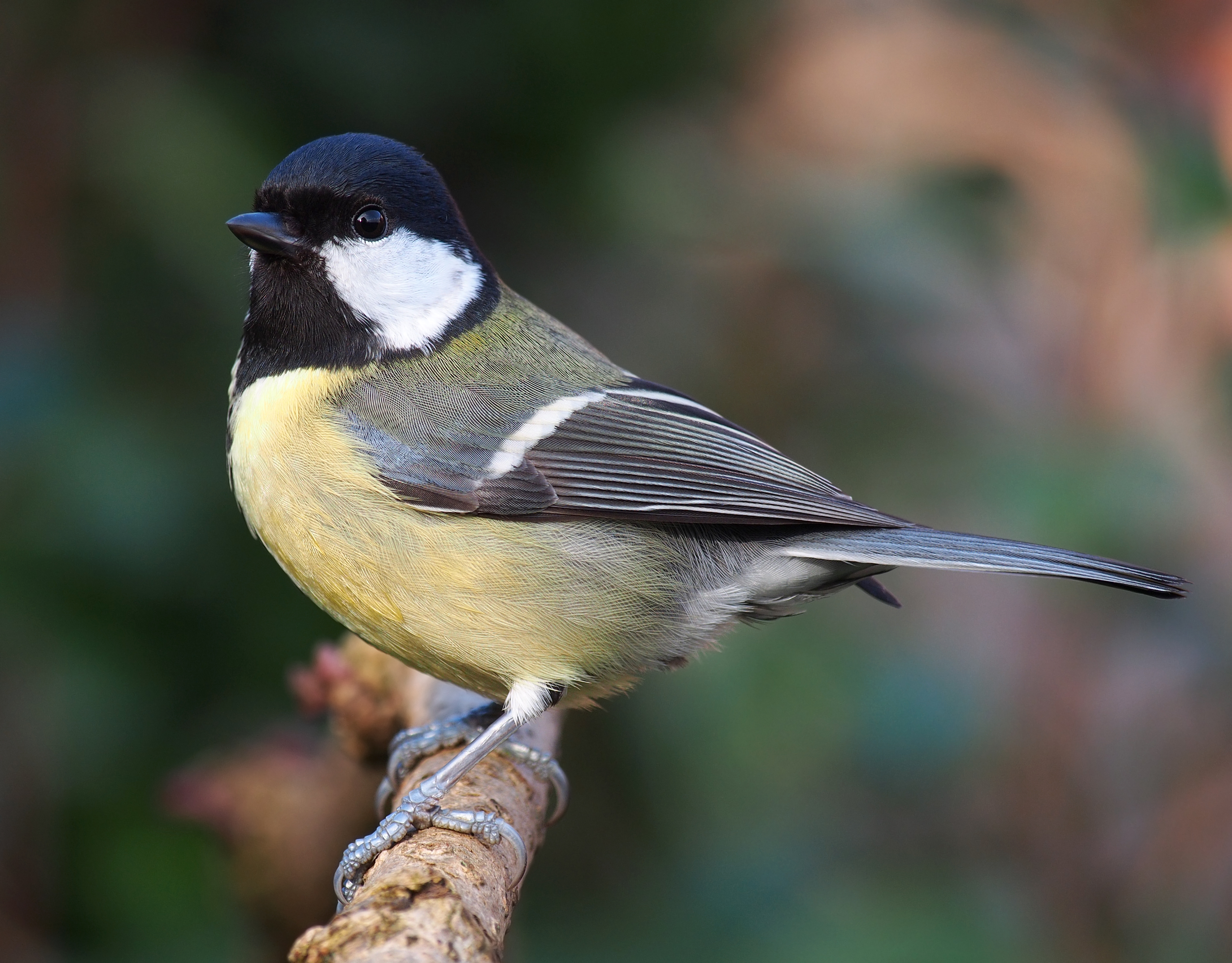
Great tit (Parus major)

Audio clip of a great tit, changing its song at the 38s mark

The great tit, Parus major, is a passerine bird belonging to the family Paridae. Passerines are commonly referred to as songbirds, with most passerines singing multiple species-specific songs making a repertoire. Birds can be ranked depending on how they perform the songs in their repertoire. On one side, there are birds that sing with eventual variety and have small repertoires, meaning that each song type in their repertoire is repeated before they switch to a different song type.

On the other side, there are birds that sing with immediate variety and have larger repertoires, meaning that they switch song types continuously. The great tit, in particular, sings with eventual variety and has a small repertoire, usually consisting of two to seven different song types. Songs can be broken down into several simpler components. Songs are made up of bouts which last from about 30 seconds-600 seconds.

A bout is a stereotyped repetition of one to five notes which are called a phrase. Between two and 20 phrases are sung are short bursts which are called strophes. In-between strophes are periods of silence, and this is referred to as the inter-strophe pause. Therefore, a great tit sings several strophes of one song type before switching to a bout of another song type from their repertoire.

Biologically, having a large repertoire is advantageous in territorial defence and larger repertoires are also correlated with higher reproductive success. Marcel Lambrechts and André Dhondt proved that average strophe length and repertoire size can be used as proxies for male quality. Male quality refers to the fitness of the bird, measuring how well it survives and its reproductive success. Lambrechts and Dhondt set out to find the answers to four questions also pertaining to percentage performance time and male quality in the great tit.

The first of four questions they sought out to determine was if high quality males, those with a higher fitness, have a higher percentage performance time in their bouts compared to lower quality males, with percentage performance time meaning the percentage of time during which song was being produced. The second was if high quality males sing longer bouts than low quality males. The third answer they sought was whether the percentage performance time changed or stayed the same during a bout. The final question they sought the answer to was whether or not the percentage performance time changed after a bird switches song types.

In order to determine the answer to the four proposed questions, Marcel and André recorded male great tits from 1983–1986 in two plots (L and B) in the Peerdsbos and another plot (U) on campus at the University of Antwerp in Wilrijk. They came up with the anti-exhaustion hypothesis as an explanation for the results obtained from their study. Their results showed that high quality males, as predicted, had a higher percentage performance time than low quality males. Lambrechts and Dhondt also found that all great tits can show a systematic decrease in the percentage performance time during a bout, which is also known as drift.

The finding that drove their hypothesis was that the males were able to recover a high percentage performance by switching song types. If the male was producing shorter strophes and having longer inter-strophe pauses (low percentage performance), then by switching to a different song type the bird would once again be able to produce longer strophes and have shorter inter-strophe pauses. Lambrechts and Dhondt proposed the anti-exhaustion hypothesis, which provided both a functional and casual explanation for the song switching behaviour in birds along with having song repertoires.

The anti-exhaustion hypothesis stated that when it is necessary for a bird to sing for a prolonged period of time at a high rate, it must continuously switch song types. The hypothesis was focused around the idea that extended bouts of singing would lead to neuromuscular exhaustion because of the repetitive and stereotyped fashion of song bouts. Marcel and André proposed that the male great tits would have longer inter-strophe pauses towards the end of a song due to this exhaustion. By switching song types, the birds would be using alternative sound-producing muscles and nerves, therefore they would be able to recover a high percentage performance once again.

== Anti-exhaustion hypothesis in blue tits ==
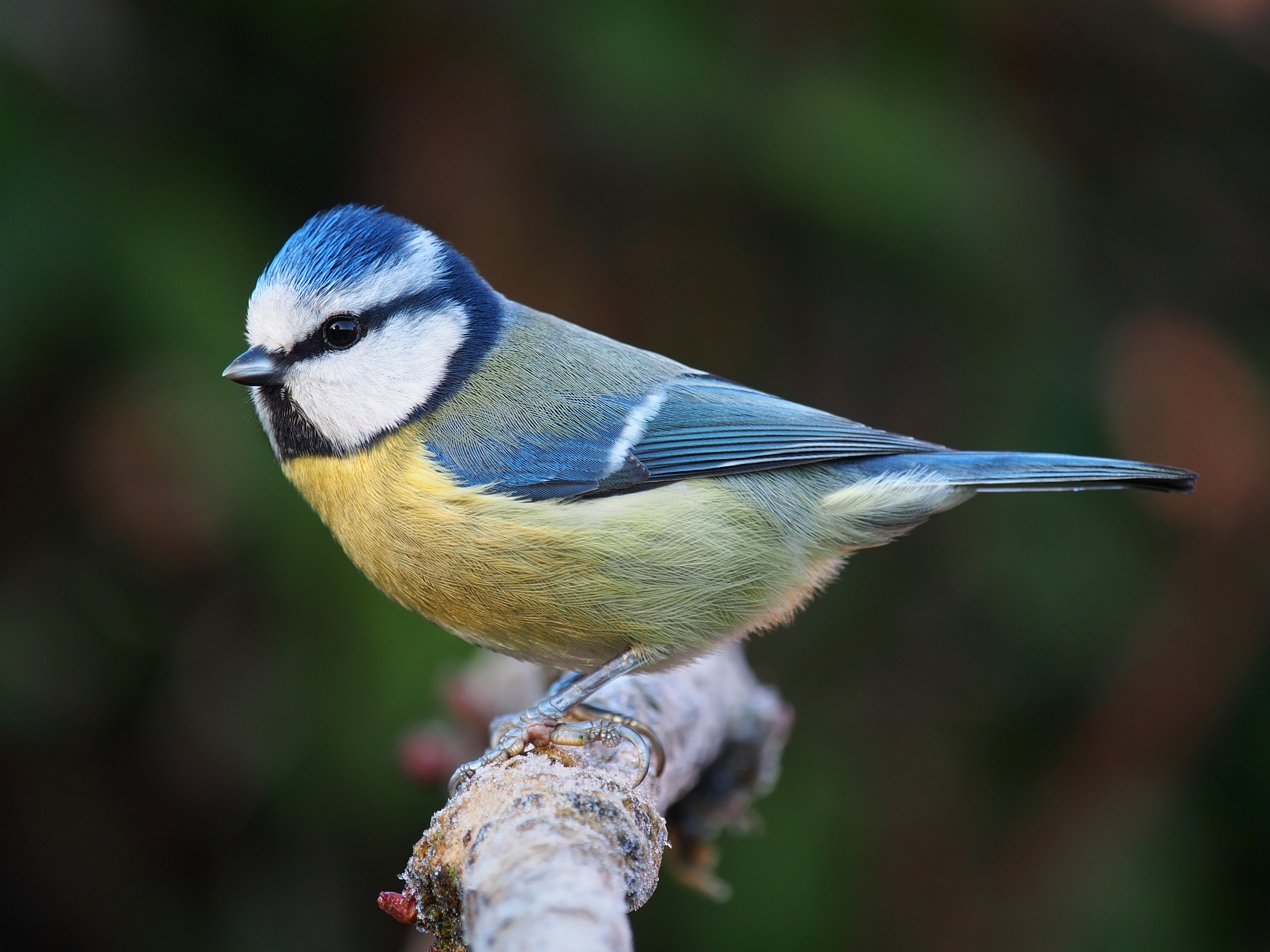
Eurasian blue tit (Cyanistes caeruleus)

Audio of a blue tit, changing its song at the 28s mark

A study completed by Angelika Poesel and Bart Kempenaers (2002) was aimed at explaining drift during blue tit (Cyanistes caeruleus) song and among other Parus species and to also explain their findings in relation to the anti-exhaustion hypothesis and the motivation hypothesis. They studied a group of 20 male blue tits at Kolbeterberg in Vienna, Austria that were living in mixed deciduous woods. The results from their study showed that male blue tits did show a decrease in performance output (percentage performance time) the longer that they performed one song typed, which was illustrated by an increase in inter-strophe pauses.

In order to confirm the anti-exhaustion hypothesis, the two factors proposed by Lambrechts and Dhondt that influenced a low percentage performance time needed to be confirmed. These two factors are the initial level of song output (the greater the initial output, the greater the drift would be), and the number of switches between song types (after a switch in song types, performance output was increased). The results from this study could conclude that a repeated stereotyped song is difficult to maintain over a long period of time, which supported the anti-exhaustive hypothesis.

== Motivation hypothesis ==
The motivation hypothesis was a competing hypothesis of the anti-exhaustion hypothesis. The motivation hypothesis, proposed by Weary in 1988, explained that drift may be due to a lack of motivation to keep singing the same song, not because of neuromuscular exhaustion. This study also worked with great tits, playing song to them during the day. Weary suggested that if drift was due to a lack of motivation, then if a bird was presented with the song of a rival, for example, then the bird should be able to increase its song output because of the motivational stimulus.

Weary also argued that if drift was caused by neuromuscular exhaustion, then birds would not be able to increase song output if they did not switch song types, which was not the case in all birds. Lambrechts argued back that the test completed by Weary was not appropriate, as it was completed during the day, not during the dawn chorus when song output is at its maximum. In order to solve this conflict, Weary and Lambrechts got together and performed a series of tests during the day and during the dawn chorus testing the responsiveness to playback.

Their results showed that both hypotheses were supported, with drift being more common during the dawn chorus (supporting the anti-exhaustive hypothesis), but also that the increase in song output was similar during periods of high and low output (supporting the motivation hypothesis). These results concluded that the anti-exhaustive hypothesis and the motivation hypothesis are both possible and can both occur at the same time.

== Warm-up hypothesis ==
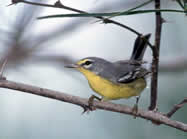
Adelaide's Warbler (Setophaga adelaidae)

The warm-up hypothesis proposed by Schraft et al. (2016) seems to contradict the anti-exhaustion hypothesis . This hypothesis foresees that birds have greater singing performance depending on the number of songs the bird has sung that day, known as recent practice, regardless of song type. This study was carried out between March and June 2012 at the Cabo Rojo National Wildlife Refuge in Puerto Rico. Male Adelaide's warblers, Setophaga adelaidae, recorded during their breeding season in their resident woods were found to have an average repertoire of 29 songs/male.

Schraft et al. tested several hypotheses, each with a different prediction and a different independent variable. The song type specific hypothesis predicted performance would decrease with consecutive repetitions of a song type, the independent variable being the run number. This hypothesis is consistent with the anti-exhaustion hypothesis. The song type general hypothesis predicted performance would increase with a higher latency period between songs, the independent variable being latency.

The warm-up hypothesis predicted performance would increase with number of songs sung, the independent variable being order. The Type I singing showcases higher performance predicted Type I songs would have higher performance than Type II songs, the independent variable. The vocal interaction hypothesis predicted performance would increase when countersinging. It was also hypothesized that time-dependent factors influenced performance, the independent variable being time.

The results from the study showed that singing performance improves with time throughout the morning. This was explained only by the warm-up hypothesis, the cumulative number of songs that the bird had sung that morning. The other hypotheses were found to have no effect on singing performance, including the song type specific hypothesis which is consistent with the anti-exhaustion hypothesis. Schraft et al. proposed that the anti-exhaustion hypothesis and the warm-up hypothesis are not mutually exclusive as the birds that warm up still may need to switch song types because of fatigue.

== See also ==
- Bird vocalization
