= Hans Stadler =

German ornithologist

Hans Stadler (11 April 1875 – 22 August 1962) was a German physician and naturalist. He had absolute pitch, and took a keen interest in the study and description of bird calls, and a wrote a book, Die Vogelsprache (1919), on the subject in collaboration with Cornel Schmitt. Along with Schmitt, he made bird recordings in the field before 1914.

== Life and work ==
Stadler was born in Rain am Lech. His father loved fishing, while his grandfather kept birds at home, and the young Stadler also developed an interest in nature. He attended Gymnasium in Regensburg living under very strict conditions, and was unable to explore nature. Around 1892, he was in contact with Ottmar Hofmann (1835-1900), an entomologist and friend of his father. He also met the Nuremberg doctor Ludwig Koch (1825-1908), who specialized in spiders.

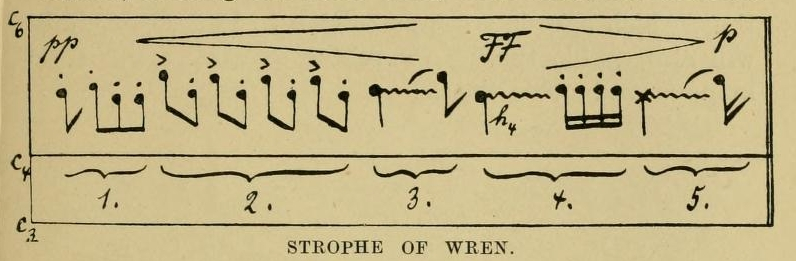
Wren calls described using the notation of Schmitt and Stadler (1914)

In 1894, he joined the University of Erlangen to study medicine and attended courses in zoology. His teachers included the anatomist Arnold Spuler and the zoologist Emil Selenka (1842-1902), who studied mammalian embryos. As Selenka was busy with his study, he had deputed teaching to Albert Fleischmann (1862-1942), an avowed anti-evolutionist. Stadler however worked as his assistant, and received a monthly salary of 120 marks. His dissertation in 1898 was on "On the influence of urea salicylate on uric acid excretion and diuresis", and he passed the state medical exam.

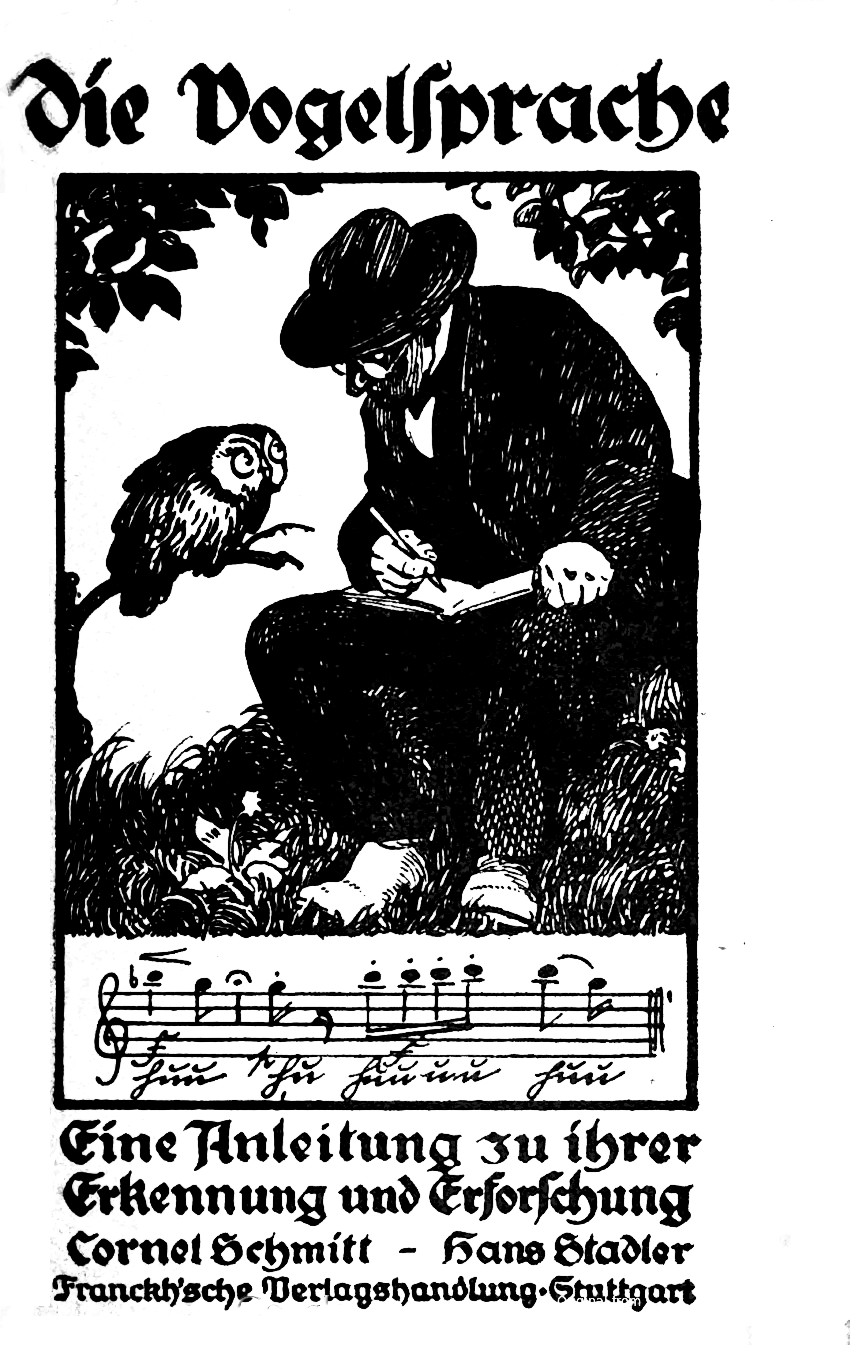
Cover of Die Vogelsprache (1919), possibly a depiction of Stadler

He started practice and began to study biology in his spare time. He worked on a book on bee biology that he published in 1911. In 1902, he became a physician in Lohr and began to study insects and birds in the region in his spare time. He became a member of the Bavarian ornithological society in 1907. In 1908, he was introduced to birdsong by a patient named Karl Heimberger. In 1909, Cornel Schmitt moved to Lohr and they began to collaborate. Stadler made use of his perfect pitch ability to study bird calls in the field. He carried tuned metal whistles into the field, and made notes to identify regional and seasonal variation and dialects in bird song. Like his aviculturist grandfather, he also kept birds in his consulting area. With Schmitt, he studied bird calls and made phonograph recordings in the field around 1914. Stadler examined older studies on bird song, and wrote an appreciation of the work of Daines Barrington. Stadler was among the first to suggest that the characters of a bird song might be affected by the environment they live in. He coined the term melotope for variations in bird song with habitat. He suggested that birds in similar habitats may have a similar structure and particularly that birds in habitats with low-frequency noise might use higher frequency vocalizations.

Stadler became a founding editor of the periodical of the Aschaffenburg Natural History Museum, Nachrichten des Naturwissenschaftlichen Museums der Stadt Aschaffenburg, through which he promoted nature conservation. During World War I he served in Italy.

He was a member of the Bund Naturschutz and was involved in protecting the old oak forests with the support of Herman Dingler. Stadler joined the NSDAP in 1922, and from 1932 to 1935 he was a Ortsgruppenleiter (local group leader). He gave lively lectures on nature protection, which included imitations of birdsong. At the International Ornithological Congress in 1930, he suggested that a library of bird song be created, just as bird skin collections were maintained by museums. When the Nazi party passed the Reichsnaturschutzgesetz (Reich Nature Conservation Act) in 1935, he was made an honorary nature conservation officer for Mainfranken district. He worked with Reichslandschaftsanwalt Alwin Seifert, and claimed that "Holzjuden" (Jewish timber merchants, lit. 'wood Jews') would deplete the old oak forests. Stadler obtained some land near Romberg which was taken over and included as part of a nature reserve in 1942. He travelled widely in Europe and became acquainted with Stanko Karaman. At the end of World War II in 1945, Stadler was arrested due to his former party associations, and placed in the Hammelburg civilian internment camp. Here he met many other nature lovers, including the entomologist Wolfgang Stichel, with whom he wrote about the animals of the camp. Stichel even described a species Acanthosoma stadleri, however this is considered a synonym of Acanthosoma haemorrhoidale (Linnaeus, 1758). He was released from internment in 1946, after which he did not resume his clinic, but instead began to explore the Romberg nature reserve, and continued to work on nature conservation until his death in 1962.

Stadler is buried in the Sendelbach Cemetery. The lake near Sendelbach was named as Stadlersee in his honour. The lake continues to hold a population of endangered fairy shrimp Eubranchipus grubii, that Stadler had discovered.
