= Leonid Krushinsky =

- Born: June 16, 1911; Moscow, Russian Empire
- Died: May 25, 1984 (aged 72); Moscow, Soviet Union
- Scientific career
- Fields: Biology
- Institutions: Moscow State University

Leonid Viktorovich Krushinsky (Russian: Леонид Викторович Крушинский; 16 June 1911 – 25 May 1984) was a Soviet and Russian biologist who specialized in the experimental study of animal behaviour at Moscow State University. The Krushinksy-Molodkina strain of rat susceptible to seizures caused by loud sounds was produced in his laboratory in the 1950s and is named after him and his student Ludmila Molodkina.

== Biography ==
Krushinsky was born in Moscow and went to the Moscow State University where he graduated in 1934. He then worked on animal behaviour under M. M. Zavadovsky and defended a thesis on defensive reactions in dogs in 1938 and received his doctorate on animal behaviour development in 1946. He became a professor in 1957.

Leon Orbeli invited Krushinsky to work at the Pavlov Laboratory. Krushinsky conducted experiments on conditioning in rats and one of their observations was unexpected seizures induced by a loud bell. Just as genetics laboratories were being closed in the 1940s in response to Lysenkoism he demonstrated auditory seizures in a strain of Wistar rats and then maintained the line which showed genetic heritability of the character although he never made use of words like genetics or heredity in his publications on the topic. Studies on the KM strain helped the development of anticonvulsant drugs for the management of epileptic seizures. Krushinsky developed tests for animal reasoning and intelligence. During World War II he was assigned to dog breeding and training for training mine detection, guide, and rescue dogs. They also trained dogs to drop explosives in front of tanks and trains. They also studied the genetics of behaviour and conducted experiments on the behaviour of wolves and foxes. Krushinsky attempted to explain the connection between intelligence and neural organization in the brain.

Krushinsky published several texts on animal behaviour and guided a number of students.
