= Cornel Schmitt =

Cornel Schmitt (4 January 1874 – 13 January 1958) was a German pedagogue, musician, naturalist, and writer. He considered the natural world as a key to teaching and learning. He was a pioneer of bird acoustics and worked along with Hans Stadler to produce phonograph recordings and apply ideas from music to their description.

== Life and work ==
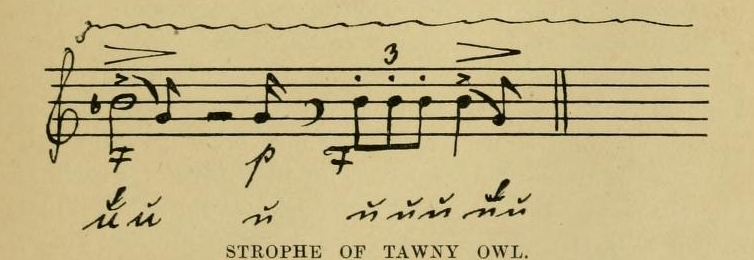
Strophe of Strix aluco by Schmitt and Stadler (1914)

Schmitt was born in Marktheidenfeld, thirty kilometres west of Würzburg in the musically talented family of organist and teacher Karl Stephan and Anna née Schmitt. He learned to play the violin at five, the piano at nine and the organ at the age of ten. He also became a keen observer of nature. He studied at a preparatory school in Lohr am Main from 1886 to 1891. He then went to the Würzburg teacher training school and became a teacher at various places including Freising and Landsberg am Lech. He then moved to Würzburg where he married Mathilde née Sommer. In 1909 he moved back to the Lohr Preparatory school as a director and began to deal with natural history and music teaching. Here he met Hans Stadler (1875–1962), the engineer Pleikart Stumpf (1888–1946) and Adam Guckenberger (1886–1964). The three were involved in recording bird songs and producing phonographs before World War I. In 1919 Schmitt and Stadler wrote on bird vocalization. The introduced modifications to musical notation to allow animal and non-musical sounds. They also introduced syllabic elements for timbre and removed the musical bar. In 1923 Schmitt moved to the Teacher Training Institute in Würzburg and began to work on photography along with A. Leon and he began to use photographs to illustrate his books. He was influenced by the philosophy of Berthold Otto and his approach to education was the concept of wholeness or holistic perception. He also began to deliver radio talks on biology. Schmitt saw nature as a part of his teaching method and conducted excursions for teaching. He published several books including "Wege zur Naturliebe" (Pathways to Nature Appreciation); "Lebenskampf und Anpassung der Pflanze – 300 Versuche und Beobachtungen" (Struggle for Life and Adaptation of Plants - 300 Experiments and Observations); and "Lebensgemeinschaften der deutschen Heimat" (Life Communities of the German Homeland). Schmitt did not embrace the Nazi ideology and retired in 1936. He returned to teaching in 1944. Two of his sons died in the war and his home was destroyed in 1945. He continued to write books dealing with education in nature such as "Biologie in der Arbeitsschule – Ausschnitte aus der Lebensarbeit eines alten Schulmeisters" (Biology in the Work School - Excerpts from the Life's Work of an Old Schoolmaster) and "Der Teich und sein Leben" (The Pond and Its Life).
