= Animal cognition =

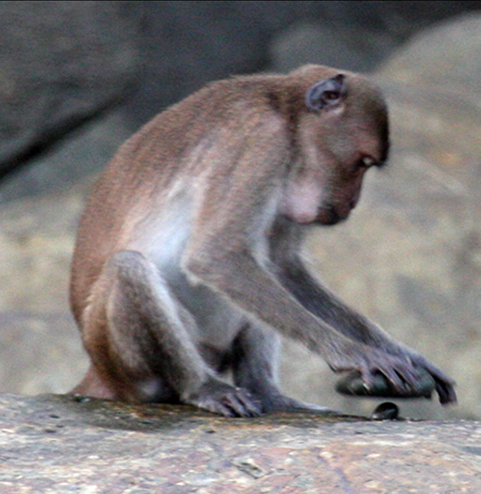
A crab-eating macaque using a stone tool to crack open a nut

Experiments like the string-pulling task performed here by a Carib grackle provide insights into animal cognition.

Animal cognition encompasses the mental capacities of non-human animals, including insect cognition. The study of animal conditioning and learning used in this field was developed from comparative psychology. It has also been strongly influenced by research in ethology, behavioral ecology, and evolutionary psychology; the alternative name cognitive ethology is sometimes used. Many behaviors associated with the term animal intelligence are also subsumed within animal cognition.

Researchers have examined animal cognition in mammals (especially primates, cetaceans, elephants, bears, dogs, cats, pigs, horses, cattle, raccoons and rodents), birds (including parrots, fowl, corvids and pigeons), reptiles (lizards, crocodilians, snakes, and turtles), fish and invertebrates (including cephalopods, spiders and insects).

== Historical background ==
=== Earliest inferences ===
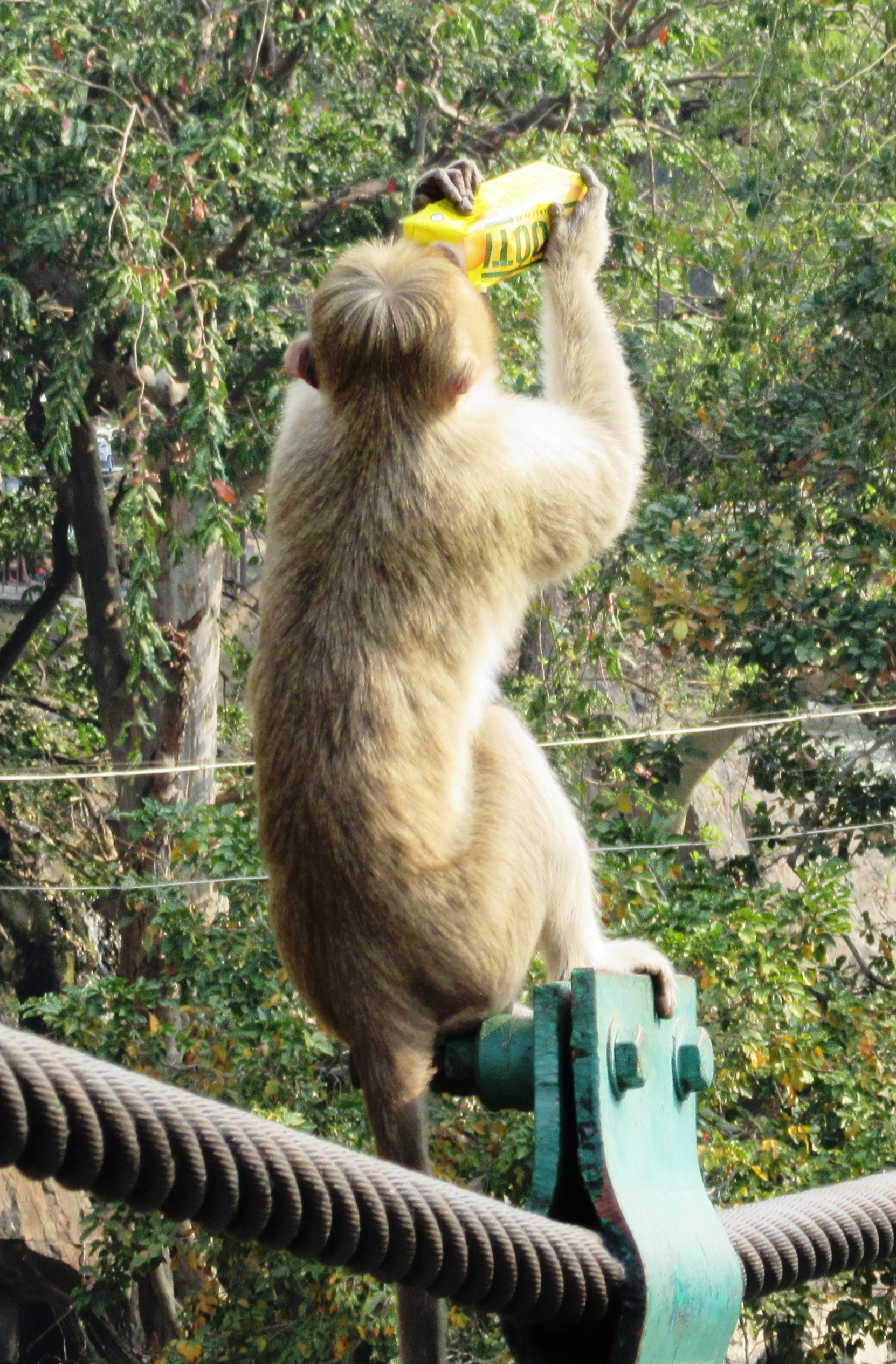
A monkey drinking Frooti from a juice box using its hands

The mind and behavior of non-human animals has captivated the human imagination for centuries. Many writers, such as Descartes, have speculated about the presence or absence of the animal mind. These speculations led to many observations of animal behavior before modern science and testing were available. This ultimately resulted in the creation of multiple hypotheses about animal intelligence.

One of Aesop's Fables was The Crow and the Pitcher, in which a crow drops pebbles into a vessel of water until he is able to drink. This was a relatively accurate reflection of the capability of corvids to understand water displacement. The Roman naturalist Pliny the Elder was the earliest to attest that said story reflects the behavior of real-life corvids.

Aristotle, in his biology, hypothesized a causal chain where an animal's sense organs transmitted information to an organ capable of making decisions, and then to a motor organ. Despite Aristotle's cardiocentrism (mistaken belief that cognition occurred in the heart), this approached some modern understandings of information processing.

Early inferences were not necessarily precise or accurate. Nonetheless, interest in animal mental abilities, and comparisons to humans, increased with early myrmecology, the study of ant behavior, as well as the classification of humans as primates beginning with Linnaeus.

=== Morgan's Canon ===
Coined by 19th-century British psychologist C. Lloyd Morgan, Morgan's Canon remains a fundamental precept of comparative (animal) psychology. In its developed form, it states that:

In no case is an animal activity to be interpreted in terms of higher psychological processes if it can be fairly interpreted in terms of processes which stand lower in the scale of psychological evolution and development.

In other words, Morgan believed that anthropomorphic approaches to animal behavior were fallacious, and that people should only consider behaviour as, for example, rational, purposive or affectionate, if there is no other explanation in terms of the behaviours of more primitive life-forms to which we do not attribute those faculties.

=== From anecdote to laboratory ===
Speculation about animal intelligence gradually yielded to scientific study after Darwin placed humans and animals on a continuum, although Darwin's largely anecdotal approach to the cognition topic would not pass scientific muster later on. This method would be expanded by his protégé George J. Romanes, who played a key role in the defense of Darwinism and its refinement over the years. Still, Romanes is most famous for two major flaws in his work: his focus on anecdotal observations and entrenched anthropomorphism. Unsatisfied with the previous approach, E. L. Thorndike brought animal behavior into the laboratory for objective scrutiny. Thorndike's careful observations of the escape of cats, dogs, and chicks from puzzle boxes led him to conclude that what appears to the naive human observer to be intelligent behavior may be strictly attributable to simple associations. According to Thorndike, using Morgan's Canon, the inference of animal reason, insight, or consciousness is unnecessary and misleading. At about the same time, I. P. Pavlov began his seminal studies of conditioned reflexes in dogs. Pavlov quickly abandoned attempts to infer canine mental processes; such attempts, he said, led only to disagreement and confusion. He was, however, willing to propose unseen physiological processes that might explain his observations.

=== The behavioristic half-century ===
The work of Thorndike, Pavlov and a little later of the outspoken behaviorist John B. Watson set the direction of much research on animal behavior for more than half a century. During this time there was considerable progress in understanding simple associations; notably, around 1930 the differences between Thorndike's instrumental (or operant) conditioning and Pavlov's classical (or Pavlovian) conditioning were clarified, first by Miller and Kanorski, and then by B. F. Skinner. Many experiments on conditioning followed; they generated some complex theories, but they made little or no reference to intervening mental processes. Probably the most explicit dismissal of the idea that mental processes control behavior was the radical behaviorism of Skinner. This view seeks to explain behavior, including "private events" like mental images, solely by reference to the environmental contingencies impinging on the human or animal.

Despite the predominantly behaviorist orientation of research before 1960, the rejection of mental processes in animals was not universal during those years. Influential exceptions included, for example, Wolfgang Köhler and his insightful chimpanzees and Edward Tolman whose proposed cognitive map was a significant contribution to subsequent cognitive research in both humans and animals.

=== The cognitive revolution ===
Beginning around 1960, a "cognitive revolution" in research on humans gradually spurred a similar transformation of research with animals. Inference to processes not directly observable became acceptable and then commonplace. An important proponent of this shift in thinking was Donald O. Hebb, who argued that "mind" is simply a name for processes in the head that control complex behavior, and that it is both necessary and possible to infer those processes from behavior. Animals came to be seen as "goal seeking agents that acquire, store, retrieve, and internally process information at many levels of cognitive complexity".

== Methods ==
The acceleration of research on animal cognition in the last 50 years or so has led to a rapid expansion in the variety of species studied and methods employed. The remarkable behavior of large-brained animals such as primates and cetacea have claimed special attention, but all sorts of animals large and small (birds, fish, ants, bees, and others) have been brought into the laboratory or observed in carefully controlled field studies. In the laboratory, animals push levers, pull strings, dig for food, swim in water mazes, or respond to images on computer screens to get information for discrimination, attention, memory, and categorization experiments. Careful field studies explore memory for food caches, navigation by stars, communication, tool use, identification of conspecifics, and many other matters. Studies often focus on the behavior of animals in their natural environments and discuss the putative function of the behavior for the propagation and survival of the species. These developments reflect an increased cross-fertilization from related fields such as ethology and behavioral ecology. Contributions from behavioral neuroscience are beginning to clarify the physiological substrate of some inferred mental process.

Some researchers have made effective use of a Piagetian methodology, taking tasks which human children are known to master at different stages of development and investigating which of them can be performed by particular species. Others have been inspired by concerns for animal welfare and the management of domestic species; for example, Temple Grandin has harnessed her unique expertise in animal welfare and the ethical treatment of farm livestock to highlight underlying similarities between humans and other animals. From a methodological point of view, one of the main risks in this sort of work is anthropomorphism, the tendency to interpret an animal's behavior in terms of human feelings, thoughts, and motivations.

== Research questions ==
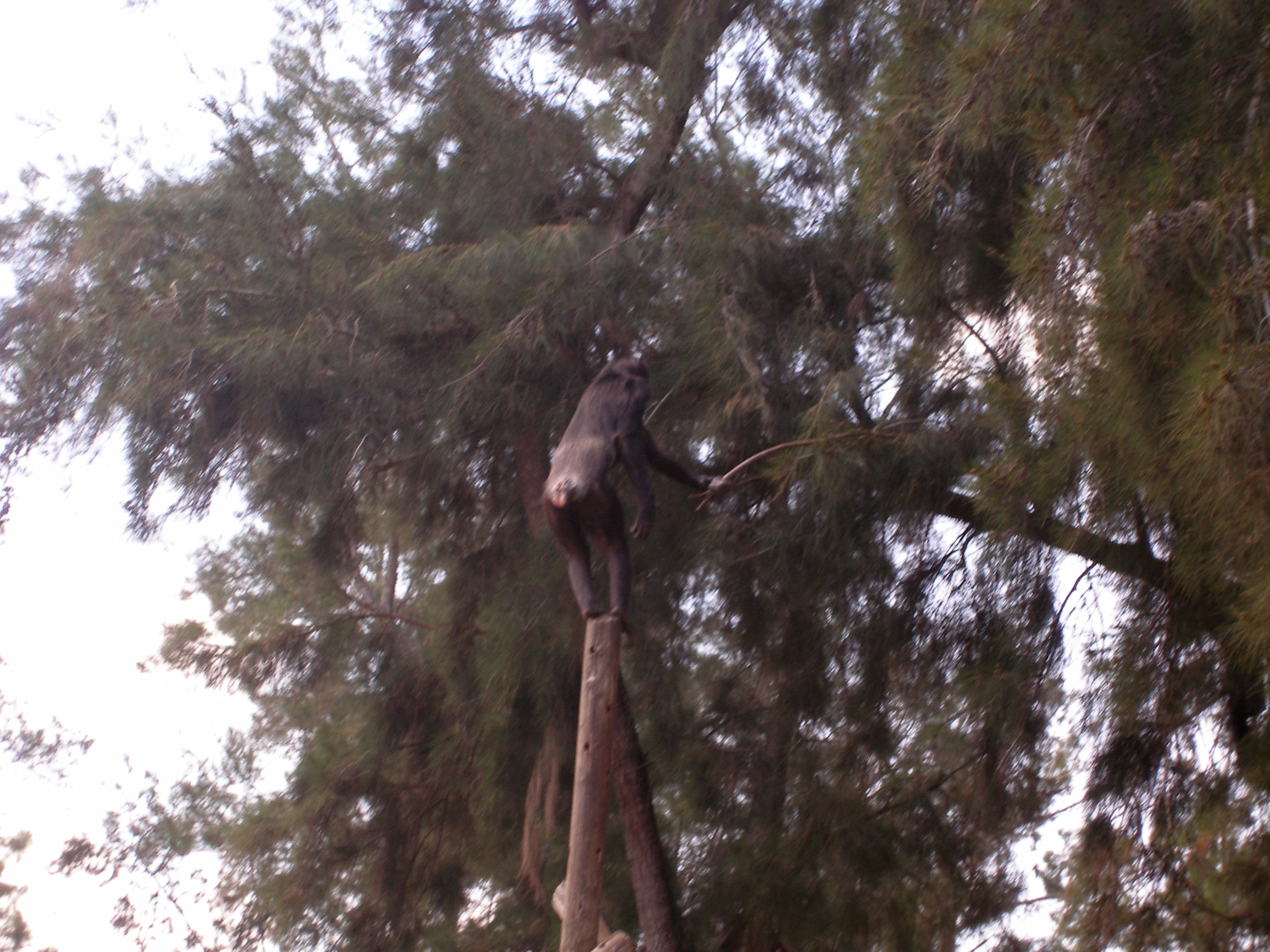
The common chimpanzee can use tools. This individual is using a stick to get food.

Human and non-human animal cognition have much in common, and this is reflected in the research summarized below; most of the headings found here might also appear in an article on human cognition. Of course, research in the two also differs in important respects. Notably, much research with humans either studies or involves language, and much research with animals is related directly or indirectly to behaviors important to survival in natural settings. Following are summaries of some of the major areas of research in animal cognition.

Evolutionary approaches to animal cognition have emphasized that learning and other cognitive abilities are shaped by the structure of environmental change. The predictability and timescale of ecological variation are considered key determinants of when learning should evolve, and recent syntheses have highlighted the need for standardized measures of environmental change to better connect theoretical models with empirical systems.

=== Perception ===
Animals process information from eyes, ears, and other sensory organs to perceive the environment. Perceptual processes have been studied in many species, with results that are often similar to those in humans. Equally interesting are those perceptual processes that differ from, or go beyond those found in humans, such as echolocation in bats and dolphins, motion detection by skin receptors in fish, and extraordinary visual acuity, motion sensitivity and ability to see ultraviolet light in some birds.

=== Attention ===
Much of what is happening in the world at any moment is irrelevant to current behavior. Attention refers to mental processes that select relevant information, inhibit irrelevant information, and switch among these as the situation demands. Often the selective process is tuned before relevant information appears; such expectation makes for rapid selection of key stimuli when they become available. A large body of research has explored the way attention and expectation affect the behavior of non-human animals, and much of this work suggests that attention operates in birds, mammals and reptiles in much the same way that it does in humans.

==== Selective learning ====
Animals trained to discriminate between two stimuli, such as black versus white, can be said to attend to the "brightness dimension", but this says little about whether this dimension is selected in preference to others. More enlightenment comes from experiments that allow the animal to choose from several alternatives. For example, several studies have shown that performance is better on, for example, a color discrimination (e.g. blue vs green) after the animal has learned another color discrimination (e.g. red vs orange) than it is after training on a different dimension such as an X shape versus an O shape. The reverse effect happens after training on forms. Thus, the earlier learning appears to affect which dimension, color or form, the animal will attend to.

Other experiments have shown that after animals have learned to respond to one aspect of the environment responsiveness to other aspects is suppressed. In "blocking", for example, an animal is conditioned to respond to one stimulus ("A") by pairing that stimulus with reward or punishment. After the animal responds consistently to A, a second stimulus ("B") accompanies A on additional training trials. Later tests with the B stimulus alone elicit little response, suggesting that learning about B has been blocked by prior learning about A. This result supports the hypothesis that stimuli are neglected if they fail to provide new information. Thus, in the experiment just cited, the animal failed to attend to B because B added no information to that supplied by A. If true, this interpretation is an important insight into attentional processing, but this conclusion remains uncertain because blocking and several related phenomena can be explained by models of conditioning that do not invoke attention.

==== Divided attention ====
Attention is a limited resource and is not a none-or-all response: the more attention devoted to one aspect of the environment, the less is available for others. A number of experiments have studied this in animals. In one experiment, a tone and a light are presented simultaneously to pigeons. The pigeons gain a reward only by choosing the correct combination of the two stimuli (e.g. a high frequency tone together with a yellow light). The birds perform well at this task, presumably by dividing attention between the two stimuli. When only one of the stimuli varies and the other is presented at its rewarded value, discrimination improves on the variable stimulus but discrimination on the alternative stimulus worsens. These outcomes are consistent with the notion that attention is a limited resource that can be more or less focused among incoming stimuli.

==== Visual search and attentional priming ====
As noted above, the function of attention is to select information that is of special use to the animal. Visual search typically calls for this sort of selection, and search tasks have been used extensively in both humans and animals to determine the characteristics of attentional selection and the factors that control it.

Experimental research on visual search in animals was initially prompted by field observations published by Luc Tinbergen (1960). Tinbergen observed that birds are selective when foraging for insects. For example, he found that birds tended to catch the same type of insect repeatedly even though several types were available. Tinbergen suggested that this prey selection was caused by an attentional bias that improved detection of one type of insect while suppressing detection of others. This "attentional priming" is commonly said to result from a pretrial activation of a mental representation of the attended object, which Tinbergen called a "searching image".

Tinbergen's field observations on priming have been supported by a number of experiments. For example, Pietrewicz and Kamil (1977, 1979) presented blue jays with pictures of tree trunks upon which rested either a moth of species A, a moth of species B, or no moth at all. The birds were rewarded for pecks at a picture showing a moth. Crucially, the probability with which a particular species of moth was detected was higher after repeated trials with that species (e.g. A, A, A,...) than it was after a mixture of trials (e.g. A, B, B, A, B, A, A...). These results suggest again that sequential encounters with an object can establish an attentional predisposition to see the object.

Another way to produce attentional priming in search is to provide an advance signal that is associated with the target. For example, if a person hears a song sparrow he or she may be predisposed to detect a song sparrow in a shrub, or among other birds. A number of experiments have reproduced this effect in animal subjects.

Still other experiments have explored nature of stimulus factors that affect the speed and accuracy of visual search. For example, the time taken to find a single target increases as the number of items in the visual field increases. This rise in reaction time is steep if the distracters are similar to the target, less steep if they are dissimilar, and may not occur if the distracters are very different from the target in form or color.

=== Concepts and categories ===
Fundamental but difficult to define, the concept of "concept" was discussed for hundreds of years by philosophers before it became a focus of psychological study. Concepts enable humans and animals to organize the world into functional groups; the groups may be composed of perceptually similar objects or events, diverse things that have a common function, relationships such as same versus different, or relations among relations such as analogies.

==== Methods ====
Most work on animal concepts has been done with visual stimuli, which can easily be constructed and presented in great variety, but auditory and other stimuli have been used as well. Pigeons have been widely used, for they have excellent vision and are readily conditioned to respond to visual targets; other birds and a number of other animals have been studied as well. In a typical experiment, a bird or other animal confronts a computer monitor on which a large number of pictures appear one by one, and the subject gets a reward for pecking or touching a picture of a category item and no reward for non-category items. Alternatively, a subject may be offered a choice between two or more pictures. Many experiments end with the presentation of items never seen before; successful sorting of these items shows that the animal has not simply learned many specific stimulus-response associations. A related method, sometimes used to study relational concepts, is matching-to-sample. In this task an animal sees one stimulus and then chooses between two or more alternatives, one of which is the same as the first; the animal is then rewarded for choosing the matching stimulus.

==== Perceptual categories ====
Perceptual categorization is said to occur when a person or animal responds in a similar way to a range of stimuli that share common features. For example, a squirrel climbs a tree when it sees Rex, Shep, or Trixie, which suggests that it categorizes all three as something to avoid. This sorting of instances into groups is crucial to survival. Among other things, an animal must categorize if it is to apply learning about one object (e.g. Rex bit me) to new instances of that category (dogs may bite).

==== Natural categories ====
Many animals readily classify objects by perceived differences in form or color. For example, bees or pigeons quickly learn to choose any red object and reject any green object if red leads to reward and green does not. A more demanding task, at least in principle, is categorizing natural objects that vary widely in color and form even while belonging to the same group. In a classic study, Richard J. Herrnstein trained pigeons to respond to the presence or absence of human beings in photographs. The birds readily learned to peck photos that contained partial or full views of humans and to avoid pecking photos with no human, despite great differences in the form, size, and color of both the humans displayed and in the non-human pictures. In follow-up studies, pigeons categorized other natural objects (e.g. trees) and after training they were able without reward to sort photos they had not seen before. Similar work has been done with natural auditory categories, for example, bird songs. Honeybees (Apis mellifera) are able to form concepts of "up" and "down".

==== Functional or associative categories ====
Perceptually unrelated stimuli may come to be responded to as members of a class if they have a common use or lead to common consequences. An oft-cited study by Vaughan (1988) provides an example. Vaughan divided a large set of unrelated pictures into two arbitrary sets, A and B. Pigeons got food for pecking at pictures in set A but not for pecks at pictures in set B. After they had learned this task fairly well, the outcome was reversed: items in set B led to food and items in set A did not. Then the outcome was reversed again, and then again, and so on. Vaughan found that after 20 or more reversals, associating a reward with a few pictures in one set caused the birds to respond to the other pictures in that set without further reward as if they were thinking "if these pictures in set A bring food, the others in set A must also bring food." That is, the birds now categorized the pictures in each set as functionally equivalent. Several other procedures have yielded similar results.

==== Relational or abstract categories ====
When tested in a simple stimulus matching-to-sample task (described above) many animals readily learn specific item combinations, such as "touch red if the sample is red, touch green if the sample is green." But this does not demonstrate that they distinguish between "same" and "different" as general concepts. Better evidence is provided if, after training, an animal successfully makes a choice that matches a novel sample that it has never seen before. Monkeys and chimpanzees do learn to do this, as do pigeons if they are given a great deal of practice with many different stimuli. However, because the sample is presented first, successful matching might mean that the animal is simply choosing the most recently seen "familiar" item rather than the conceptually "same" item. A number of studies have attempted to distinguish these possibilities, with mixed results.

==== Rule learning ====
The use of rules has sometimes been considered an ability restricted to humans, but a number of experiments have shown evidence of simple rule learning in primates and also in other animals. Much of the evidence has come from studies of sequence learning in which the "rule" consists of the order in which a series of events occurs. Rule use is shown if the animal learns to discriminate different orders of events and transfers this discrimination to new events arranged in the same order. For example, Murphy et al. (2008) trained rats to discriminate between visual sequences. For one group ABA and BAB were rewarded, where A="bright light" and B="dim light". Other stimulus triplets were not rewarded. The rats learned the visual sequence, although both bright and dim lights were equally associated with reward. More importantly, in a second experiment with auditory stimuli, rats responded correctly to sequences of novel stimuli that were arranged in the same order as those previously learned. Similar sequence learning has been demonstrated in birds and other animals as well.

=== Memory ===
The categories that have been developed to analyze human memory (short term memory, long term memory, working memory) have been applied to the study of animal memory, and some of the phenomena characteristic of human short term memory (e.g. the serial position effect) have been detected in animals, particularly monkeys. However most progress has been made in the analysis of spatial memory; some of this work has sought to clarify the physiological basis of spatial memory and the role of the hippocampus; other work has explored the spatial memory of scatter-hoarder animals such as Clark's nutcracker, certain jays, tits and certain squirrels, whose ecological niches require them to remember the locations of thousands of caches, often following radical changes in the environment.

Memory has been widely investigated in foraging honeybees, Apis mellifera, which use both transient short-term working memory that is non-feeder specific and a feeder specific long-term reference memory. Memory induced in a free-flying honeybee by a single learning trial lasts for days and, by three learning trials, for a lifetime. Bombus terrestris audax workers vary in their effort investment towards memorising flower locations, with smaller workers less able to be selective and thus less interested in which flowers are richer sugar sources. Meanwhile, bigger B. t. audax workers have more carrying capacity and thus more reason to memorise that information, and so they do. Slugs, Limax flavus, have a short-term memory of approximately 1 min and long-term memory of 1 month.

==== Methods ====
As in humans, research with animals distinguishes between "working" or "short-term" memory from "reference" or long-term memory. Tests of working memory evaluate memory for events that happened in the recent past, usually within the last few seconds or minutes. Tests of reference memory evaluate memory for regularities such as "pressing a lever brings food" or "children give me peanuts".

===== Habituation =====
This is one of the simplest tests for memory spanning a short time interval. The test compares an animal's response to a stimulus or event on one occasion to its response on a previous occasion. If the second response differs consistently from the first, the animal must have remembered something about the first, unless some other factor such as motivation, sensory sensitivity, or the test stimulus has changed.

===== Delayed response =====
Delayed response tasks are often used to study short-term memory in animals. Introduced by Hunter (1913), a typical delayed response task presents an animal with a stimulus such as colored light, and after a short time interval the animal chooses among alternatives that match the stimulus, or are related to the stimulus in some other way. In Hunter's studies, for example, a light appeared briefly in one of three goal boxes and then later the animal chose among the boxes, finding food behind the one that had been lighted. Most research has been done with some variation of the "delayed matching-to-sample" task. For example, in the initial study with this task, a pigeon was presented with a flickering or steady light. Then, a few seconds later, two pecking keys were illuminated, one with a steady light and one with a flickering light. The bird got food if it pecked the key that matched the original stimulus.

A commonly used variation of the matching-to-sample task requires the animal to use the initial stimulus to control a later choice between different stimuli. For example, if the initial stimulus is a black circle, the animal learns to choose "red" after the delay; if it is a black square, the correct choice is "green". Ingenious variations of this method have been used to explore many aspects of memory, including forgetting due to interference and memory for multiple items.

===== Radial arm maze =====
The radial arm maze is used to test memory for spatial location and to determine the mental processes by which location is determined. In a radial maze test, an animal is placed on a small platform from which paths lead in various directions to goal boxes; the animal finds food in one or more goal boxes. Having found food in a box, the animal must return to the central platform. The maze may be used to test both reference and working memory. Suppose, for example, that over a number of sessions the same four arms of an eight-arm maze always lead to food. If in a later test session the animal goes to a box that has never been baited, this indicates a failure of reference memory. On the other hand, if the animal goes to a box that it has already emptied during the same test session, this indicates a failure of working memory. Various confounding factors, such as odor cues, are carefully controlled in such experiments.

===== Water maze =====
The water maze is used to test an animal's memory for spatial location and to discover how an animal is able to determine locations. Typically the maze is a circular tank filled with water that has been made milky so that it is opaque. Located somewhere in the maze is a small platform placed just below the surface of the water. When placed in the tank, the animal swims around until it finds and climbs up on the platform. With practice, the animal finds the platform more and more quickly. Reference memory is assessed by removing the platform and observing the relative amount of time the animal spends swimming in the area where the platform had been located. Visual and other cues in and around the tank may be varied to assess the animal's reliance on landmarks and the geometric relations among them.

===== Novel object recognition test =====
The novel object recognition (NOR) test is an animal behavior test that is primarily used to assess memory alterations in rodents. It is a simple behavioral test that is based on a rodents innate exploratory behavior. The test is divided into three phases: habituation, training/adaptation and test phase. During the habituation phase the animal is placed in an empty test arena. This is followed by the adaptation phase, where the animal is placed in the arena with two identical objects. In the third phase, the test phase, the animal is placed in the arena with one of the familiar objects from the previous phase and with one novel object. Based on the rodents innate curiosity, the animals that remember the familiar object will spend more time on investigating the novel object.

=== Spatial cognition ===
Whether an animal ranges over a territory measured in square kilometers or square meters, its survival typically depends on its ability to do such things as find a food source and then return to its nest. Sometimes such a task can be performed rather simply, for example by following a chemical trail. Typically, however, the animal must somehow acquire and use information about locations, directions, and distances. The following paragraphs outline some of the ways that animals do this.

- Beacons Animals often learn what their nest or other goal looks like, and if it is within sight they may simply move toward it; it is said to serve as a "beacon".
- Landmarks When an animal is unable to see its goal, it may learn the appearance of nearby objects and use these landmarks as guides. Researchers working with birds and bees have demonstrated this by moving prominent objects in the vicinity of nest sites, causing returning foragers to hunt for their nest in a new location.
- Dead reckoning, also known as "path integration", is the process of computing one's position by starting from a known location and keeping track of the distances and directions subsequently traveled. Classic experiments have shown that the desert ant keeps track of its position in this way as it wanders for many meters searching for food. Though it travels in a randomly twisted path, it heads straight home when it finds food. However, if the ant is picked up and released some meters to the east, for example, it heads for a location displaced by the same amount to the east of its home nest.
- Cognitive maps Some animals appear to construct a cognitive map of their surroundings, meaning that they acquire and use information that enables them to compute how far and in what direction to go to get from one location to another. Such a map-like representation is thought to be used, for example, when an animal goes directly from one food source to another even though its previous experience has involved only travel between each source and home. Research in this area has also explored such topics as the use of geometric properties of the environment by rats and pigeons, and the ability of rats to represent a spatial pattern in either radial arm mazes or water mazes. Spatial cognition is used in visual search when an animal or human searches their environment for specific objects to focus on among other objects in the environment.
- Detour behaviour Some animals appear to have an advanced understanding of their spatial environment and will not take the most direct route if this confers an advantage to them. Some jumping spiders take an indirect route to prey rather than the most direct route, thereby indicating flexibility in behaviour and route planning, and possibly insight learning.

==== Long-distance navigation; homing ====
Many animals travel hundreds or thousands of miles in seasonal migrations or returns to breeding grounds. They may be guided by the Sun, the stars, the polarization of light, magnetic cues, olfactory cues, winds, or a combination of these.

It has been hypothesized that animals such as apes and wolves are good at spatial cognition because this skill is necessary for survival. Some researchers argue that this ability may have diminished somewhat in dogs because humans have provided necessities such as food and shelter during some 15,000 years of domestication.

=== Timing ===
==== Time of day: circadian rhythms ====
The behavior of most animals is synchronized with the earth's daily light-dark cycle. Thus, many animals are active during the day, others are active at night, still others near dawn and dusk. Though one might think that these "circadian rhythms" are controlled simply by the presence or absence of light, nearly every animal that has been studied has been shown to have a "biological clock" that yields cycles of activity even when the animal is in constant illumination or darkness. Circadian rhythms are so automatic and fundamental to living things – they occur even in plants – that they are usually discussed separately from cognitive processes.

==== Interval timing ====
Survival often depends on an animal's ability to time intervals. For example, rufous hummingbirds feed on the nectar of flowers, and they often return to the same flower, but only after the flower has had enough time to replenish its supply of nectar. In one experiment hummingbirds fed on artificial flowers that quickly emptied of nectar but were refilled at some fixed time (e.g. twenty minutes) later. The birds learned to come back to the flowers at about the right time, learning the refill rates of up to eight separate flowers and remembering how long ago they had visited each one.

The details of interval timing have been studied in a number of species. One of the most common methods is the "peak procedure". In a typical experiment, a rat in an operant chamber presses a lever for food. A light comes on, a lever-press brings a food pellet at a fixed later time, say 10 seconds, and then the light goes off. Timing is measured during occasional test trials on which no food is presented and the light stays on. On these test trials, the rat presses the lever more and more until about 10 sec and then, when no food comes, gradually stops pressing. The time at which the rat presses most on these test trials is taken to be its estimate of the payoff time.

Experiments using the peak procedure and other methods have shown that animals can time short intervals quite exactly, can time more than one event at once, and can integrate time with spatial and other cues. Such tests have also been used for quantitative tests of theories of animal timing, such as Gibbon's Scalar Expectancy Theory ("SET"), Killeen's Behavioral Theory of Timing, and Machado's Learning to Time model. No one theory has yet gained unanimous agreement.

=== Tool and weapon use ===
Although tool use was long assumed to be a uniquely human trait, there is now much evidence that many animals use tools, including mammals, birds, fish, cephalopods and insects. Discussions of tool use often involve a debate about what constitutes a "tool", and they often consider the relation of tool use to the animal's intelligence and brain size.

==== Mammals ====
Series of photographs showing a bonobo fishing for termites

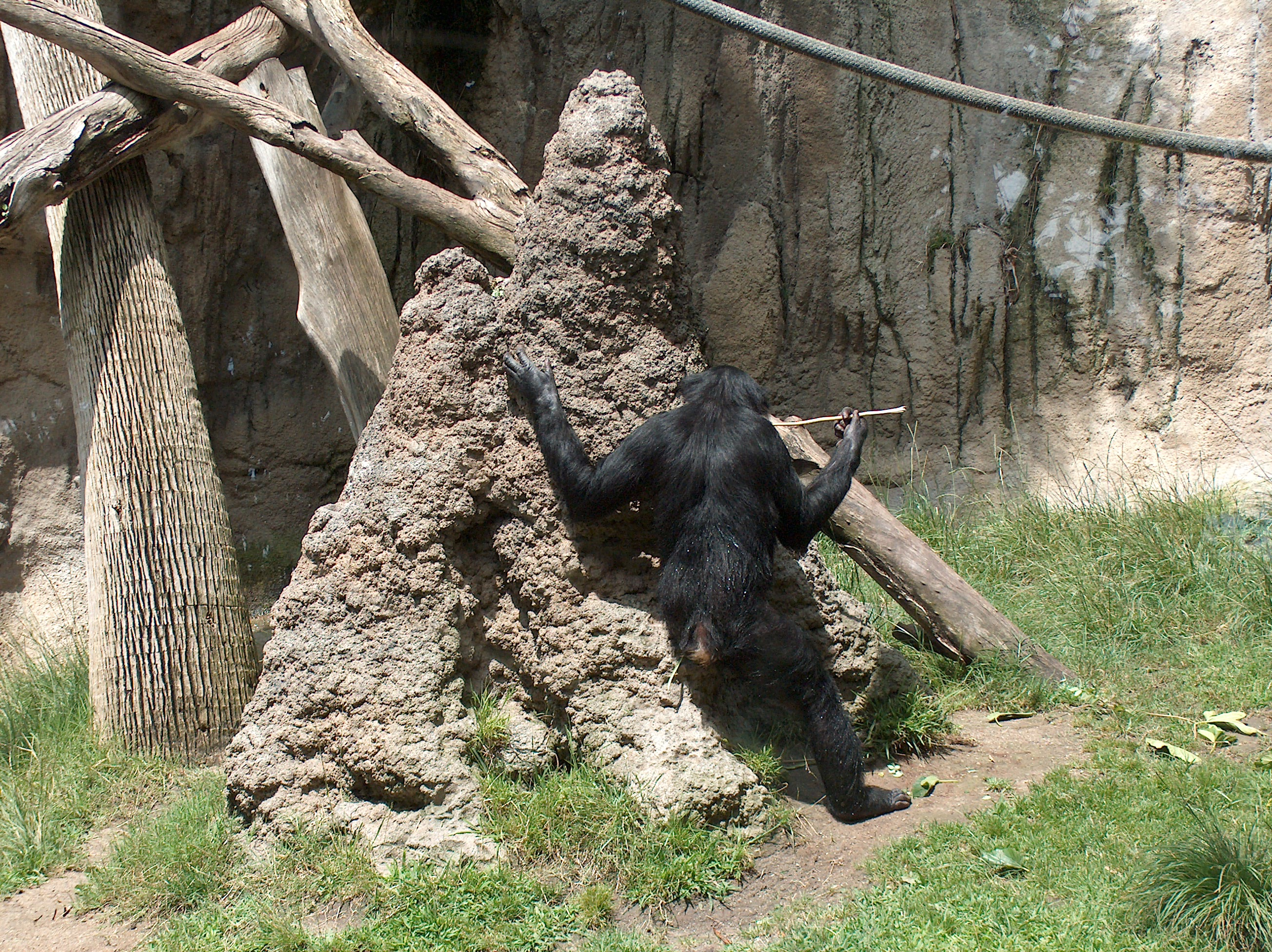
A bonobo inserting a stick into a termite mound

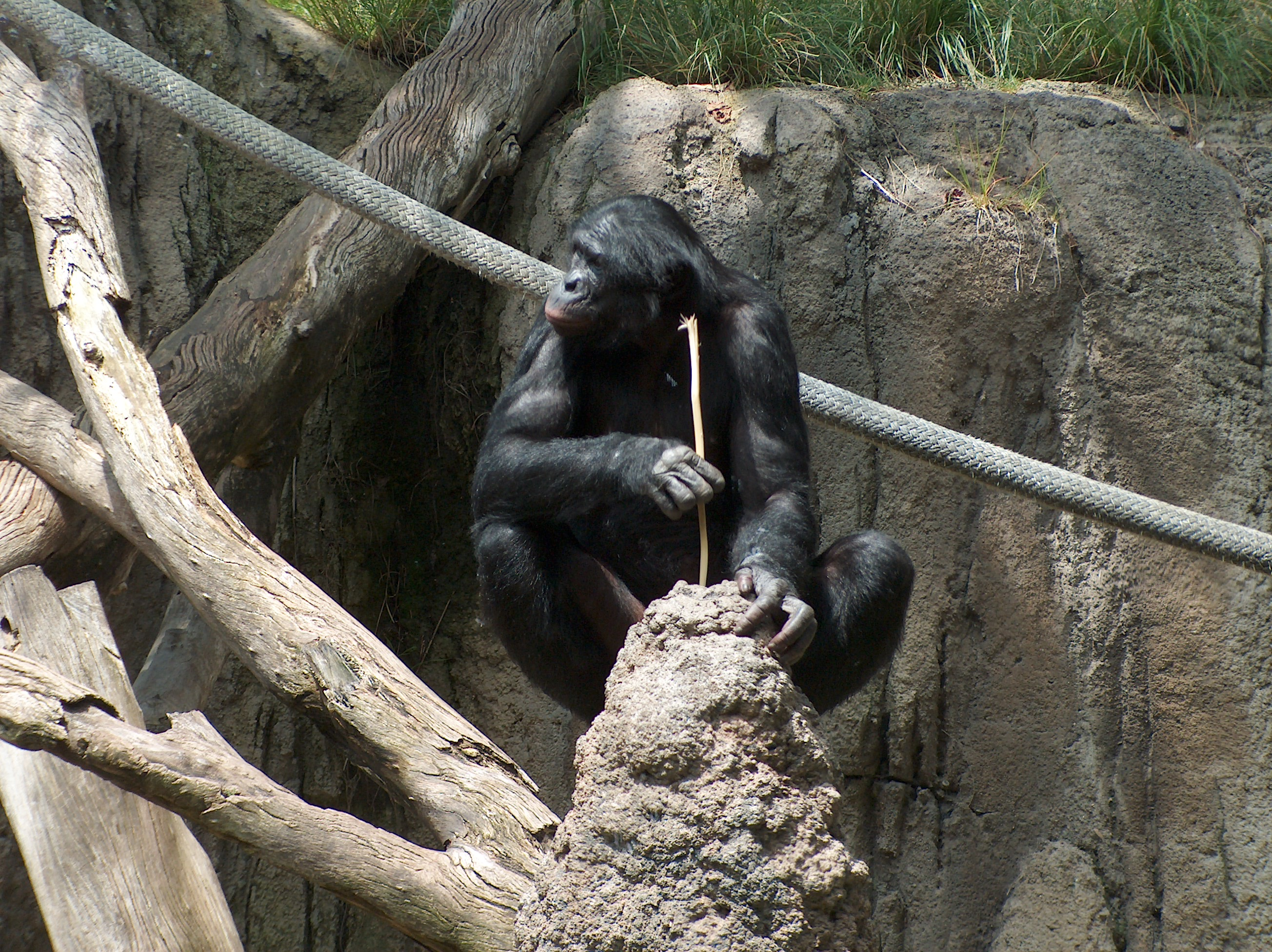
The bonobo starts "fishing" for the termites.

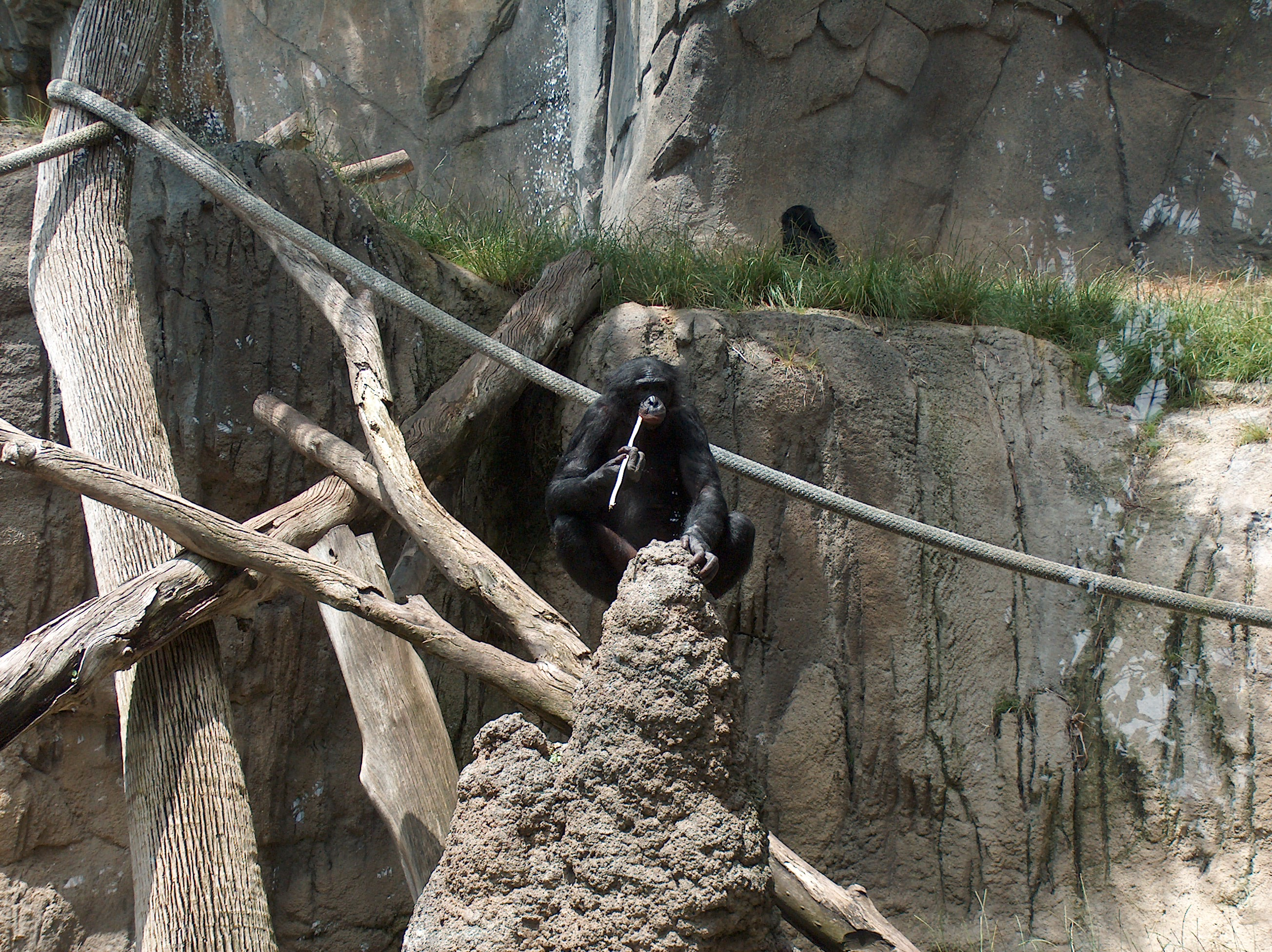
The bonobo withdraws the stick and begins eating the termites.

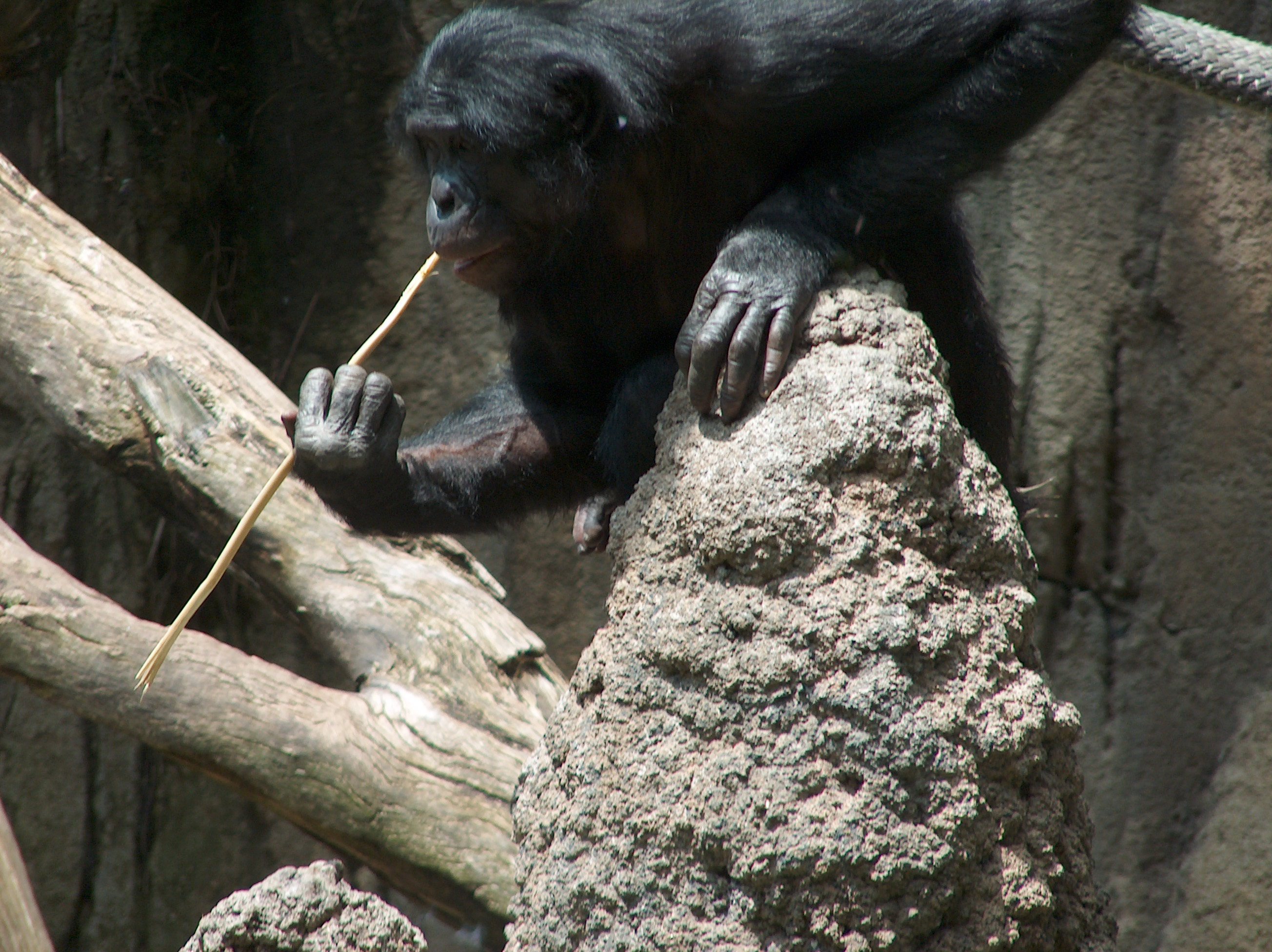
The bonobo eats the termites extracted with the tool.

Tool use has been reported many times in both wild and captive primates, particularly the great apes. The use of tools by primates is varied and includes hunting (mammals, invertebrates, fish), collecting honey, processing food (nuts, fruits, vegetables and seeds), collecting water, weapons and shelter. Research in 2007 shows that chimpanzees in the Fongoli savannah sharpen sticks to use as spears when hunting, considered the first evidence of systematic use of weapons in a species other than humans. Other mammals that spontaneously use tools in the wild or in captivity include elephants, bears, cetaceans, sea otters and mongooses.

==== Birds ====
Several species of birds have been observed to use tools in the wild, including warblers, parrots, Egyptian vultures, brown-headed nuthatches, gulls and owls. Some species, such as the woodpecker finch of the Galapagos Islands, use particular tools as an essential part of their foraging behavior. However, these behaviors are often quite inflexible and cannot be applied effectively in new situations. A great many species of birds build nests with a wide range of complexities, but although nest-building behaviour fulfills the criteria of some definitions of "tool-use", this is not the case with other definitions.

Several species of corvids have been trained to use tools in controlled experiments. One species examined extensively under laboratory conditions is the New Caledonian crow. One individual called "Betty" spontaneously made a wire tool to solve a novel problem. She was being tested to see whether she would select a wire hook rather than a straight wire to pull a little bucket of meat out of a well. Betty tried poking the straight wire at the meat. After a series of failures with this direct approach, she withdrew the wire and began directing it at the bottom of the well, which was secured to its base with duct tape. The wire soon became stuck, whereupon Betty pulled it sideways, bending it and unsticking it. She then inserted the hook into the well and extracted the meat. In all but one of 10 subsequent trials with only straight wire provided, she also made and used a hook in the same manner, but not before trying the straight wire first.

Another bird that is highly studied for its intelligence is the African Gray Parrot. American animal behaviorist and psychologist Irene Pepperberg vindicated that African Grays possess cognitive abilities. Pepperberg used a bird named "Alex" in her trials and was able to prove that parrots could associate sound and meaning, demolishing long-held theories that birds were only capable of mimicking human voices. Studies by other researchers have determined that African Grays can use deductive reasoning to correctly choose between pairs of boxes containing food and boxes that are empty. Until Pepperberg began this research in the 1970s, few scientists had studied intelligence in parrots, and few do today. Most inquiries have instead focused on monkeys, chimpanzees, gorillas, and dolphins, all of which are much more difficult to raise, feed, and handle. By the late 1980s, Alex had learned the names of more than 50 different objects, five shapes, and seven colors. He'd also learned what "same" and "different" mean—a step crucial in human intellectual development.

==== Fish ====
Several species of wrasses have been observed using rocks as anvils to crack bivalve (scallops, urchins and clams) shells. This behavior was first filmed in an orange-dotted tuskfish (Choerodon anchorago) in 2009 by Giacomo Bernardi. The fish fans sand to unearth the bivalve, takes it into its mouth, swims several meters to a rock, which it then uses as an anvil by smashing the mollusc apart with sideward thrashes of the head. This behaviour has also been recorded in a blackspot tuskfish (Choerodon schoenleinii) on Australia's Great Barrier Reef, yellowhead wrasse (Halichoeres garnoti) in Florida and a six-bar wrasse (Thalassoma hardwicke) in an aquarium setting. These species are at opposite ends of the phylogenetic tree in this family, so this behaviour may be a deep-seated trait in all wrasses.

==== Invertebrates ====
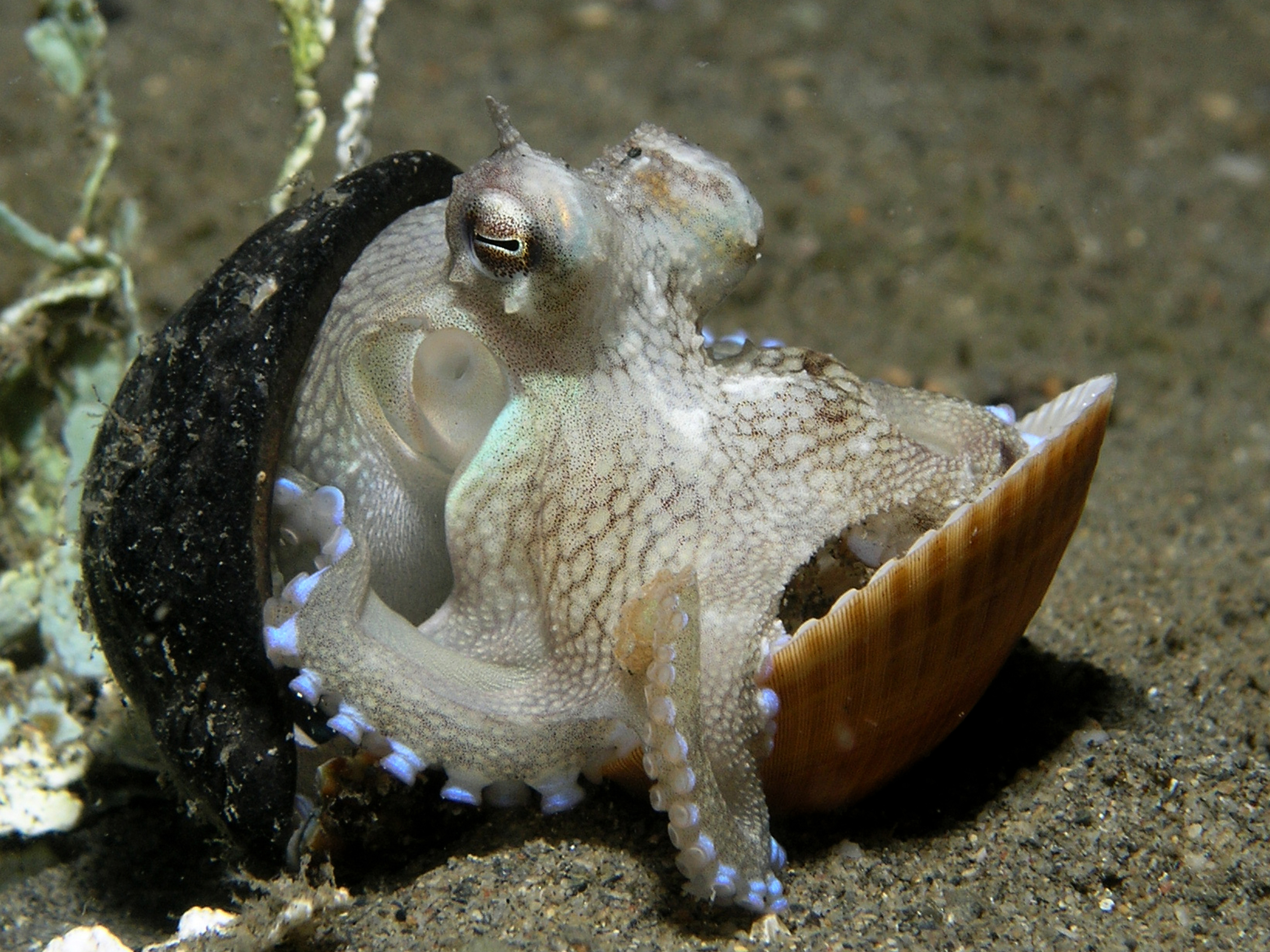
An octopus traveling with shells collected for protection. Despite evolving independently from humans for over 600 million years, octopuses demonstrate problem-solving abilities, adaptive learning, and likely sentience.

Cephalopods are capable of complex tasks, thus earning them the reputation of being among the smartest of invertebrates. For example, octopuses can open jars to get the contents inside and have remarkable ability to learn new skills from the moment they are born. Some cephalopods are known to use coconut shells for protection or camouflage. Cephalopod cognitive evolution is hypothesized to have been shaped primarily by predatory and foraging pressures, but a challenging mating context may also have played a role.

Ants of the species Conomyrma bicolor pick up stones and other small objects with their mandibles and drop them down the vertical entrances of rival colonies, allowing workers to forage for food without competition.

=== Reasoning and problem solving ===
It is clear that animals of quite a range of species are capable of solving problems that appear to require abstract reasoning; Wolfgang Köhler's (1917) work with chimpanzees is a famous early example. He observed that chimpanzees did not use trial and error to solve problems such as retrieving bananas hung out of reach. Instead, they behaved in a manner that was "unwaveringly purposeful", spontaneously placing boxes so that they could climb to reach the fruit. Modern research has identified similar behavior in animals usually thought of as much less intelligent, if appropriate pre-training is given. Causal reasoning has also been observed in rooks and New Caledonian crows.

It has been shown that Barbados bullfinches (Loxigilla barbadensis) from urbanized areas are better at innovative problem-solving tasks than bullfinches from rural environments, but that they did not differ in colour discrimination learning.

=== Cognitive bias ===
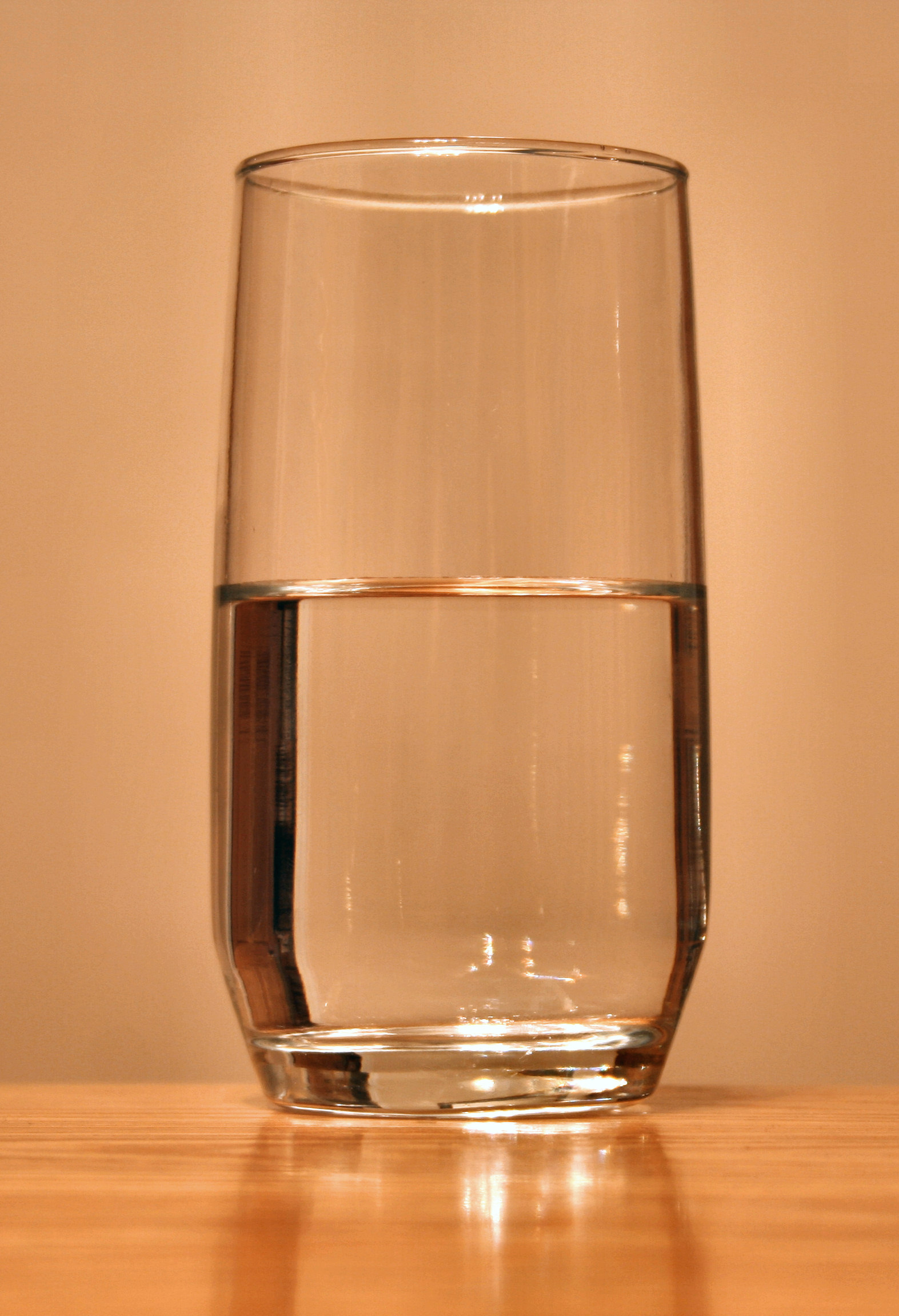
Is the glass half empty or half full?

A cognitive bias refers to a systematic pattern of deviation from norm or rationality in judgment, whereby inferences about other individuals or situations may be drawn in an illogical fashion.

Cognitive bias is sometimes illustrated by using answers to the question "Is the glass half empty or half full?". Choosing "half empty" is supposed to indicate pessimism whereas choosing "half full" indicates optimism. To test this in animals, an individual is trained to anticipate that stimulus A, e.g. a 100 Hz tone, precedes a positive event, e.g. highly desired food is delivered when a lever is pressed by the animal. The same individual is trained to anticipate that stimulus B, e.g. a 900 Hz tone, precedes a negative event, e.g. bland food is delivered when the animal presses a lever. The animal is then tested by being given an intermediate stimulus C, e.g. a 500 Hz tone, and observing whether the animal presses the lever associated with the positive or negative reward. This has been suggested to indicate whether the animal is in a positive or negative mood.

In a study that used this approach, rats that were playfully tickled responded differently than rats that were simply handled. The rats that had been tickled were more optimistic than the handled rats. The authors suggested that they had demonstrated "...for the first time a link between the directly measured positive affective state and decision making under uncertainty in an animal model".

There is some evidence for cognitive bias in a number of species, including rats, dogs, rhesus macaques, sheep, chicks, starlings and honeybees.

=== Language ===
The modeling of human language in animals is known as animal language research. In addition to the ape-language experiments mentioned above, there have also been more or less successful attempts to teach language or language-like behavior to some non-primate species, including parrots and great spotted woodpeckers. Arguing from his own results with the animal Nim Chimpsky and his analysis of others results, Herbert Terrace criticized the idea that chimps can produce new sentences. Shortly thereafter Louis Herman published research on artificial language comprehension in the bottlenose dolphin. Though this sort of research has been controversial, especially among cognitive linguists, many researchers agree that many animals can understand the meaning of individual words, and that some may understand simple sentences and syntactic variations. Elephants can remember tone, melody, and recognise more than 20 words. Nevertheless, there is little evidence that any animal can produce new strings of symbols that correspond to new sentences.

=== Insight ===
Wolfgang Köhler is usually credited with introducing the concept of insight into experimental psychology. Working with chimpanzees, Köhler came to dispute Edward Thorndike's theory that animals must solve problems gradually, by trial and error. He said that Thorndike's animals could only use trial and error because the situation precluded other forms of problem solving. He provided chimps with a relatively unstructured situation, and he observed sudden "ah-ha!" insightful changes of behavior, as, for example, when a chimp suddenly moved a box into position so that it could retrieve a banana. More recently, Asian elephants (Elephas maximus) were shown to exhibit similar insightful problem solving. A male was observed moving a box to a position where it could be stood upon to reach food that had been deliberately hung out of reach.

=== Numeracy ===
A variety of studies indicates that animals are able to use and communicate quantitative information, and that some can count in a rudimentary way. Some examples of this research follow.

In one study, rhesus monkeys viewed visual displays containing, for example, 1, 2, 3, or 4 items of different sorts. They were trained to respond to them in several ways involving numerical ordering, for example touching "1" first, "2" second and so on. When tested with displays containing items they had never seen before, they continued to respond to them in order. The authors conclude that monkeys can represent the numerosities 1 to 9 at least on an ordinal scale.

Ants are able to use quantitative values and transmit this information. For instance, ants of several species are able to estimate quite precisely numbers of encounters with members of other colonies on their feeding territories. Moreover, ants of some species can count up to 20 and add and subtract numbers within 5. This has been demonstrated using carefully crafted experiments based on measuring the time it takes for a scouting ant to pass the information to its team about the branch of an experimental maze on which food can be found.

Numeracy has been described in the yellow mealworm beetle (Tenebrio molitor) and the honeybee.

Western lowland gorillas given the choice between two food trays demonstrated the ability to choose the tray with more food items at a rate higher than chance after training. In a similar task, chimpanzees chose the option with the larger amount of food. Salamanders given a choice between two displays with differing amounts of fruit flies, used as a food reward, reliably choose the display with more flies, as shown in a particular experiment.

Other experiments have been conducted that show animals' abilities to differentiate between non-food quantities. American black bears demonstrated quantity differentiation abilities in a task with a computer screen. The bears were trained to touch a computer monitor with a paw or nose to choose a quantity of dots in one of two boxes on the screen. Each bear was trained with reinforcement to pick a larger or smaller amount. During training, the bears were rewarded with food for a correct response. All bears performed better than what random error predicted on the trials with static, non-moving dots, indicating that they could differentiate between the two quantities. The bears choosing correctly in congruent (number of dots coincided with area of the dots) and incongruent (number of dots did not coincide with area of the dots) trials suggests that they were indeed choosing between quantities that appeared on the screen, not just a larger or smaller retinal image, which would indicate they are only judging size.

Bottlenose dolphins have shown the ability to choose an array with fewer dots compared to one with more dots. Experimenters set up two boards showing various numbers of dots in a poolside setup. The dolphins were initially trained to choose the board with the fewer number of dots. This was done by rewarding the dolphin when it chose the board with the fewer number of dots. In the experimental trials, two boards were set up, and the dolphin would emerge from the water and point to one board. The dolphins chose the arrays with fewer dots at a rate much larger than chance, indicating they can differentiate between quantities. A particular grey parrot, after training, has shown the ability to differentiate between the numbers zero through six using vocalizations. After number and vocalization training, this was done by asking the parrot how many objects there were in a display. The parrot was able to identify the correct amount at a rate higher than chance. Angelfish, when put in an unfamiliar environment will group together with conspecifics, an action named shoaling. Given the choice between two groups of differing size, the angelfish will choose the larger of the two groups. This can be seen with a discrimination ratio of 2:1 or greater, such that, as long as one group has at least twice the fish as another group, it will join the larger one.

Monitor lizards have been shown to be capable of numeracy, and some species can distinguish among numbers up to six.

=== Sapience ===
As the cognitive ability and intelligence in non-human animals cannot be measured with verbal scales, it has been measured using a variety of methods that involve such things as habit reversal, social learning, and responses to novelty. Principal component analysis and factor analytic studies have shown that a single factor of intelligence is responsible for 47% of the individual variance in cognitive ability measures in primates and between 55% and 60% of the variance in mice. These values are similar to the accepted variance in IQ explained by a similar single factor known as the general factor of intelligence in humans (40–50%). However, results from a recent meta-analysis suggest that the average correlation between performance scores on various cognitive tasks is only 0.18. Results from this study suggest that current evidence for general intelligence is weak in non-human animals.

The general factor of intelligence, or g factor, is a psychometric construct that summarizes the correlations observed between an individual's scores on various measures of cognitive abilities. It has been suggested that g is related to evolutionary life histories and the evolution of intelligence as well as to social learning and cultural intelligence. Non-human models of g have been used in genetic and neurological research on intelligence to help understand the mechanisms behind variation in g.

=== Theory of mind ===
Theory of mind is the ability to attribute mental states, e.g. intents, desires, pretending, knowledge, to oneself and others and to understand that others have desires, intentions, and perspectives that are different from one's own.

Some research with ravens provides an example of evidence for theory of mind in a non-human species. Ravens are members of the family Corvidae, which is widely regarded as having high cognitive abilities. These birds have been observed to hide their food when dominant ravens are visible and audible at the same time. Based on this observation, ravens were tested for their understanding of "seeing" as a mental state. In a first step, the birds protected their cache when dominants were visible but not when they could only be heard from an adjacent room. In the next step, they had access to a small peephole which allowed them to see into the adjacent room. With the peephole open, the ravens guarded their caches against discovery when they could hear dominants in the adjacent room, even when the dominant's sounds were playbacks of recordings.

=== Consciousness ===
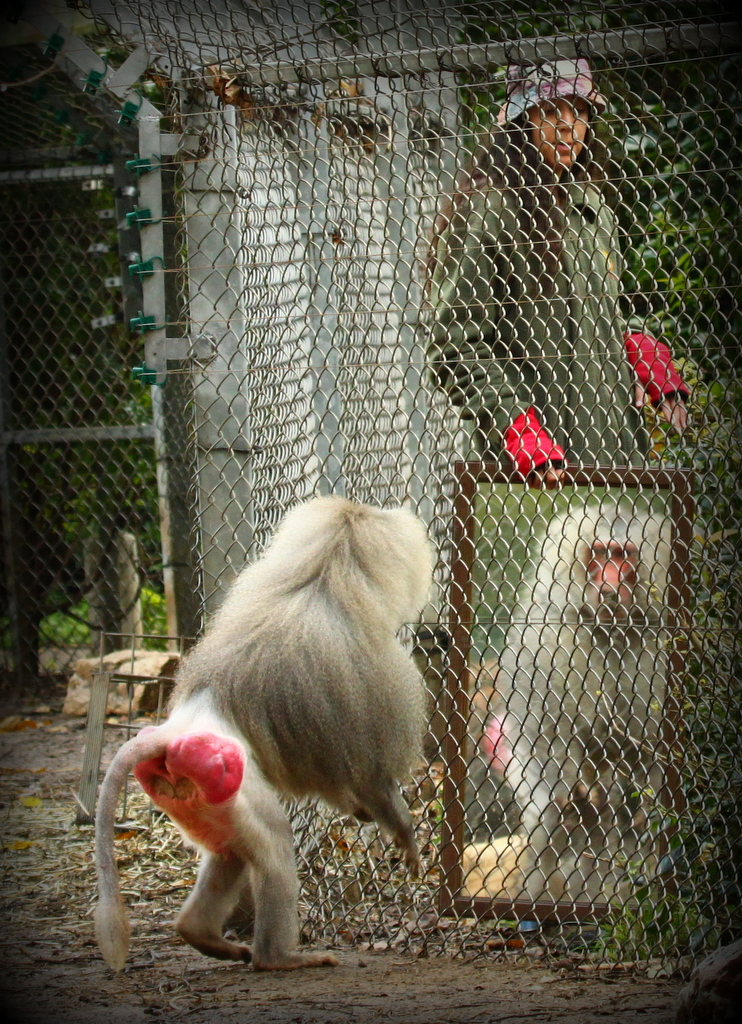
Mirror test with a baboon

The sense in which animals can be said to have self-consciousness or a self-concept has been hotly debated. The best known research technique in this area is the mirror test devised by Gordon G. Gallup, in which an animal's skin is marked in some way while it is asleep or sedated, and it is then allowed to see its reflection in a mirror; if the animal spontaneously directs grooming behavior towards the mark, that is taken as an indication that it is aware of itself. Self-awareness, by this criterion, has been reported for chimpanzees and also for other great apes, the European magpie, some cetaceans and an Asian elephant, but not for monkeys. The mirror test has been criticized by researchers because it is entirely focused on vision, the primary sense in humans, while other species rely more heavily on other senses such as the sense of smell in dogs.

It has been suggested that metacognition in some animals provides some evidence for cognitive self-awareness. The great apes, dolphins, and rhesus monkeys have demonstrated the ability to monitor their own mental states and use an "I don't know" response to avoid answering difficult questions. Unlike the mirror test, which reveals awareness of the condition of one's own body, this uncertainty monitoring is thought to reveal awareness of one's internal mental state. A 2007 study has provided some evidence for metacognition in rats, although this interpretation has been questioned. These species might also be aware of the strength of their memories.

Some researchers propose that animal calls and other vocal behaviors provide evidence of consciousness. This idea arose from research on children's crib talk by Weir (1962) and in investigations of early speech in children by Greenfield and others (1976). Some such research has been done with a macaw (see Arielle).

In July, 2012 during the "Consciousness in Human and Nonhuman Animals" conference in Cambridge a group of scientists announced and signed a declaration with the following conclusions:

Convergent evidence indicates that non-human animals have the neuroanatomical, neurochemical, and neurophysiological substrates of conscious states along with the capacity to exhibit intentional behaviors. Consequently, the weight of evidence indicates that humans are not unique in possessing the neurological substrates that generate consciousness. Non-human animals, including all mammals and birds, and many other creatures, including octopuses, also possess these neurological substrates.

== Biological constraints ==
Instinctive drift can influence the interpretation of cognitive research. Instinctive drift is the tendency of an animal to revert to instinctive behaviors that can interfere with learned responses. The concept originated with Keller and Marian Breland when they taught a raccoon to put coins into a box. The raccoon drifted to its instinctive behavior of rubbing the coins with its paws, as it would do when foraging for food.

Animal ability to process and respond to stimuli is correlated with brain size. Small-brain animals tend to show simple behaviors that are less dependent on learning than those of large-brained animals. Vertebrates, particularly mammals, have larger brains and complex behavior that changes with experience. A formula called the encephalization quotient (EQ) expresses a relationship between brain and body size; it was developed by H.J. Jerison in the late 1960s. When the encephalization quotient is plotted as a curve, an animal with an EQ above the curve is expected to show more cognitive ability than the average animal of its size, whereas an animal with an EQ below the curve is expected to have less. Various formulas been suggested, but the equation Ew(brain) = 0.12w(body)^{2/3} has been found to fit data from a sample of mammals. The formula is suggestive at best, and should only be applied to non-mammals with extreme caution. For some of the other vertebrate classes, the power of 3/4 rather than 2/3 is sometimes used, and for many groups of invertebrates, the formula may not give meaningful results.

== Experimental evidence against animal cognition ==
Several experiments cannot be readily reconciled with the belief that some animal species are intelligent, insightful, or possess a theory of mind.

Jean-Henri Fabre (1823–1915), setting the stage for all subsequent experiments of this kind, argued that insects "obey their compelling instinct, without realizing what they do". For instance, to understand that she can grab her paralyzed prey by a leg instead of an antenna is utterly beyond the powers of a sand wasp. "Her actions are like a series of echoes each awakening the next in a settled order, which allows none to sound until the previous one has sounded." Fabre's numerous experiments led him, in turn, to the view that scientists often try to "exalt animals" instead of objectively studying them.

C. Lloyd Morgan's (1852–1936) observations suggested to him that prima facie intelligent behavior in animals is often the result of either instincts or trial and error. For instance, most visitors watching Morgan's dog smoothly lifting a latch with the back of its head (and thereby opening a garden gate and escaping) were convinced that the dog's actions involved thinking. Morgan, however, carefully observed the dog's prior, random, purposeless actions and argued that they involved "continued trial and failure, until a happy effect is reached", rather than "methodical planning".

E. L. Thorndike (1874–1949) placed hungry cats and dogs in enclosures "from which they could escape by some simple act, such as pulling at a loop of cord". Their behavior suggested to him that they did not "possess the power of rationality". Most books about animal behavior, Thorndike wrote, "do not give us a psychology, but rather a eulogy of animals".

Although Wolfgang Köhler's 1912-1920 experiments are often cited as providing support for the animal cognition hypothesis, his book is replete with counterexamples. For instance, he placed chimpanzees in a situation where they could only get bananas by removing a box. The chimpanzee, Köhler observed, "has special difficulty in solving such problems; he often draws into a situation the strangest and most distant tools, and adopts the most peculiar methods, rather than remove a simple obstacle which could be displaced with perfect ease".

Daniel J. Povinelli and Timothy Eddy of the University of Louisiana showed that young chimpanzees, when given a choice between two food providers, were just as likely to beg food from a person who could see the begging gesture as from a person who could not, thereby raising the possibility that young chimpanzees do not understand that people see.

Moty Nissani of Wayne State University trained Burmese logging elephants to lift a lid in order to retrieve food from a bucket. The lid was then placed on the ground alongside the bucket (where it no longer obstructed access to the food) while the treat was simultaneously placed inside the bucket. All elephants continued to toss the lid before retrieving the reward, thus suggesting that elephants do not grasp simple causal relationships. Because the critical manipulation followed pretraining on lid removal, the result may be open to alternative interpretations involving prior training or task structure rather than causal reasoning alone. More generally, animal problem-solving studies can be influenced by motivation, experience, and unintended human cueing.

=== Limitations of experimental evidence against animal cognition ===
Some researchers have cautioned that negative results in animal-cognition experiments may reflect features of the testing context rather than the absence of a cognitive capacity. Proposed limitations include low ecological validity, captivity effects, housing conditions, stress, prior experience, motivation, and unnatural developmental histories.

One concern is that some laboratory tasks may have limited ecological validity. Boesch argued that the search for human cognitive uniqueness has often relied on tests with low ecological relevance and subjects with unnatural developmental histories, and that cognition may vary according to the specific challenges animals experience in their natural environments. Similarly, Mason argued that captivity is not a neutral "common garden" condition for comparative research, because species differ substantially in their responses to captive environments.

Housing and environmental enrichment can also affect cognition-related measures. Zentall reviewed evidence that enriched environments can influence brain development, learning, impulsivity, timing, and other cognitive measures in animals. In some cases, wild and captive animals have been found to differ in problem-solving performance. For example, McCune et al. compared wild and captive Mexican jays on an extractive foraging task and found that wild individuals solved the task faster than captive conspecifics, although the two groups did not differ in subsequent learning speed after solving the task.

These methodological concerns suggest that failures on artificial tasks should be interpreted as evidence about performance under particular experimental conditions, not necessarily as definitive evidence that a species lacks the cognitive capacity being tested.

== Cognitive faculty by species ==
A traditionally common image is the scala naturae, the ladder of nature on which animals of different species occupy successively higher rungs, with humans typically at the top. However, there is some disagreement with the use of such a hierarchy, with some critics saying it may be necessary to understand specific cognitive capacities as adaptations to differing ecological niches. Some biologists argue that humans are not, in fact, the smartest animal, and that no animal can be characterized as the smartest, given that some animals have superior cognitive skills in certain areas. This contrasts with evolutionary psychologists, such as John Tooby, who assess, based on the large list of related unique characteristics that humans do possess, that humans evolved to fill a unique "cognitive niche" and can fairly be characterized as the smartest animal.

Whether fairly or not, the performance of animals is often compared to that of humans on cognitive tasks. Our closest biological relatives, the great apes, tend to perform most like humans. Among the birds, corvids and parrots have typically been found to perform well on human-like tasks. Some octopodes have also been shown to exhibit a number of higher-level skills, such as tool use, but the amount of research on cephalopod intelligence is still limited. Baboons have been shown to be capable of recognizing words.

The average bird or mammal, both usually endotherms, have average brain-to-body ratios ten times larger than a typical ectotherm vertebrate. This has contributed to a common perception amongst researchers that mammals and birds share similar "advanced" cognitive characteristics as humans, while other vertebrates such as teleost fishes are more "primitive", which has led to them being understudied. Despite this, increasing evidence indicates that fish possess not just capabilities that cannot be explained through Pavlovian and operant conditioning alone, such as reversal learning, novel obstacle avoidance, and passing simultaneous two-choice tasks, but also even more complex capabilities such as navigational cognitive mapping, inhibitory motor control, and empathy enabled by oxytocin to sense fear in other fish. Similarly in reptiles, a 2019 review of evidence indicates they can experience numerous emotions, such as pleasure and anxiety.

== See also ==
In general

- Anthropomorphism
- Biosemiotics
- Cognitive psychology
- Deception in animals
- Embodied cognition
- Encephalization quotient
- Evolution of cognition
- Human–animal communication
- Number sense in animals
- Pain in invertebrates § Cognitive abilities
- Tool use by non-humans
- Uplift (science fiction)
- Zoopharmacognosy
- Zoosemiotics

By group

- Bird intelligence
- Cetacean intelligence
- Dog intelligence
- Fish intelligence
- Insect cognition
- Plant cognition
- Equine intelligence
