= Evolution of cognition =

Causes of cognitive abilities in animals

The evolution of cognition is the process by which life on Earth has gone from organisms with little to no cognitive function to a greatly varying display of cognitive function that we see in organisms today. Animal cognition is largely studied by observing behavior, which makes studying extinct species difficult. The definition of cognition varies by discipline; psychologists tend to define cognition by human behaviors, while ethologists have widely varying definitions. Ethological definitions of cognition range from only considering cognition in animals to be behaviors exhibited in humans, while others consider any action involving a nervous system to be cognitive.

== Methods of study ==
Studying the evolution of cognition is accomplished through a comparative cognitive approach where a cognitive ability and comparing it between closely related species and distantly related species. For example, a researcher may want to analyze the connection between spatial memory and food caching behavior. By examining two closely related animals (chickadees and jays) and/or two distantly related animals (jays and chipmunks), hypotheses could be generated about when and how this cognitive ability evolved. Another way cognition has been studied in animals, specifically insects, is through a cognitive test battery. This method measures "intelligence directly with a battery of cognitive tests rather than relying on proxies like relative brain size."

== Animals with high levels of cognition ==
Higher cognitive processes have evolved in many closely and distantly related animals. Some of these examples are considered convergent evolution, while others most likely shared a common ancestor that possessed higher cognitive function. For example, apes, humans, and cetaceans most likely had a common ancestor with high levels of cognition, and as these species diverged they all possessed this trait. Corvids (the crow family) and apes show similar cognitive abilities in some areas such as tool use. This ability is most likely an example of convergent evolution, due to their distant relatedness.

- Mammals
  - Humans possess possibly the highest level of cognitive function on earth. Some examples of their cognitive function include: high levels of motivation, self awareness, problem solving, language, culture, and many more.
  - Cetaceans (dolphins and orcas) have shown higher levels of cognition including: problem solving, tool use, and self recognition.
  - Hyenas live in highly cognitive social groups. Hyenas have also demonstrated the behavior of feigning death to avoid conflicts with predators.
  - Apes have shown cognitive abilities such as: problem solving, tool use, communication, language, theory of mind, culture, and many more.
  - Canids have shown high level cognitive abilities such as: object permanence, social learning, and episodic memory.
  - Elephants display many high cognitive behaviors, including those associated with grief, learning, mimicry, play, altruism, tool use, compassion, cooperation,
- Birds
  - Corvids demonstrates many high functioning cognitive abilities such as: problem solving, spatial temporal memory, mental time travel, and a particularly wide variety of tool usage.
  - Parrots have displayed cognitive functions such as: tool use, problem solving, and mimicry of human speech.

== Selection favoring cognition ==
=== Social living ===
Social living is thought to have co-evolved with higher cognitive processes. It is hypothesized that higher cognitive function evolved to mitigate the negative effects of living in social groups. For example, the ability to recognize individual group members could solve the problem of cheating behavior. If individuals within the group can keep track of the cheaters, then they can punish or exclude them from the group. There is also a positive correlation between relative brain size and aspects of sociality in some species There are many benefits to living in social groups such as division of labor and protection, but in order to reap these benefits the animals tend to possess high levels of cognition.

=== Sex, mating, and relationships ===
Many animals have complex mating rituals require higher levels of cognition to evaluate. Birds are well known for their intense mating displays including swan dances that can last hours or even days. There has also been studies on sexual selection and evolution of cognition in seed beetles. It shows that "cognitive ability did show sex-specificity: strong sexual selection improved cognitive ability for males but not females."

Higher levels of cognition may have evolved to facilitate the formation of longer lasting relationships. Animals that form pair bonds and share parental responsibilities produce offspring that are more likely to survive and reproduce, which increases the fitness of these individuals. The cognitive requirements for this type of mating include the ability the differentiate individuals from their group and resolve social conflicts.

=== Finding, extracting, and protecting food ===
Another hypothesis for the evolution of cognition is that cognition allowed individuals access to food and resources that were previously unavailable. For example, the genetic mutation for color vision allowed for a greatly increased efficiency in finding and foraging fruit. Food caching behavior displayed in some birds and mammals is an example of a behavior that may have co-evolved with higher cognitive processes. This ability to store food for later consumption allows these animals to take advantage of temporary surpluses in food availability. Corvids have displayed incredible abilities to create and remember the locations of up to hundreds of caches. In addition, there is evidence that this is not just an instinctual behavior, but an example of future planning. Jays have been found to diversify the types of food they catch, possible indicating they understand the need to eat a variety of food. Some supporters of this hypothesis suggest that higher cognitive processes require a large brain to body ratio. This higher brain to body size ratio in turn requires a large metabolic input to function. The idea is that the two processes (greater access to food and the brain's growing need for energy) may have snowballed the evolution of these two features.

=== Technology, tools, innovation, and culture ===
The cognitive ability to use tools and pass information from one generation to the next is thought to have been a driving force of the evolution of cognition. Many animals use tools including: primates, elephants, cetaceans, birds, fish, and some invertebrates. Tool use varies widely depending on the species. For example, sea otters have been observed using a rock to break open snail shells, while primates and New Caledonian crows have demonstrated an ability to fashion a new tool for a specific use. The ability to use tools seems to provide animals with a fitness advantage, usually in the form of access to food previously unavailable, which allows a competitive advantage for these individuals.

Some animals have demonstrated the ability to pass information from one generation to the next (culture) including: primates, cetaceans, and birds. Primates and birds can pass information of specific tool use strategies on to their offspring who can, in turn, pass it on to their offspring. In this way, the information can remain in a group on individuals even after the original users are gone. One famous example of this is in a group of macaque monkeys in Japan. Researchers studying this species observed these monkeys feeding behavior in a population in Japan. The researchers witnessed one female, named Imo, realize that by washing potatoes in the nearby river you could remove much more sand and dirt then by simply wiping it off. Over the next few generations the researcher saw this behavior begin to appear in other individuals throughout the group.

== See also ==
- Animal Cognition
- Anthropomorphism
- Bird intelligence
- Cetacean intelligence
- Cephalopod intelligence
- Deception in animals
- Dog intelligence
- Fish intelligence
- Human-animal communication
- Theory of mind in animals
- g factor in non-humans
