= Pig intelligence =

Behavior and instructions in pigs

Pigs are among the most intelligent mammals on the planet; they display a wide range of complex behaviors, such as using a joystick to move a pointer on a computer screen, understanding human instructions, and using primitive tools.

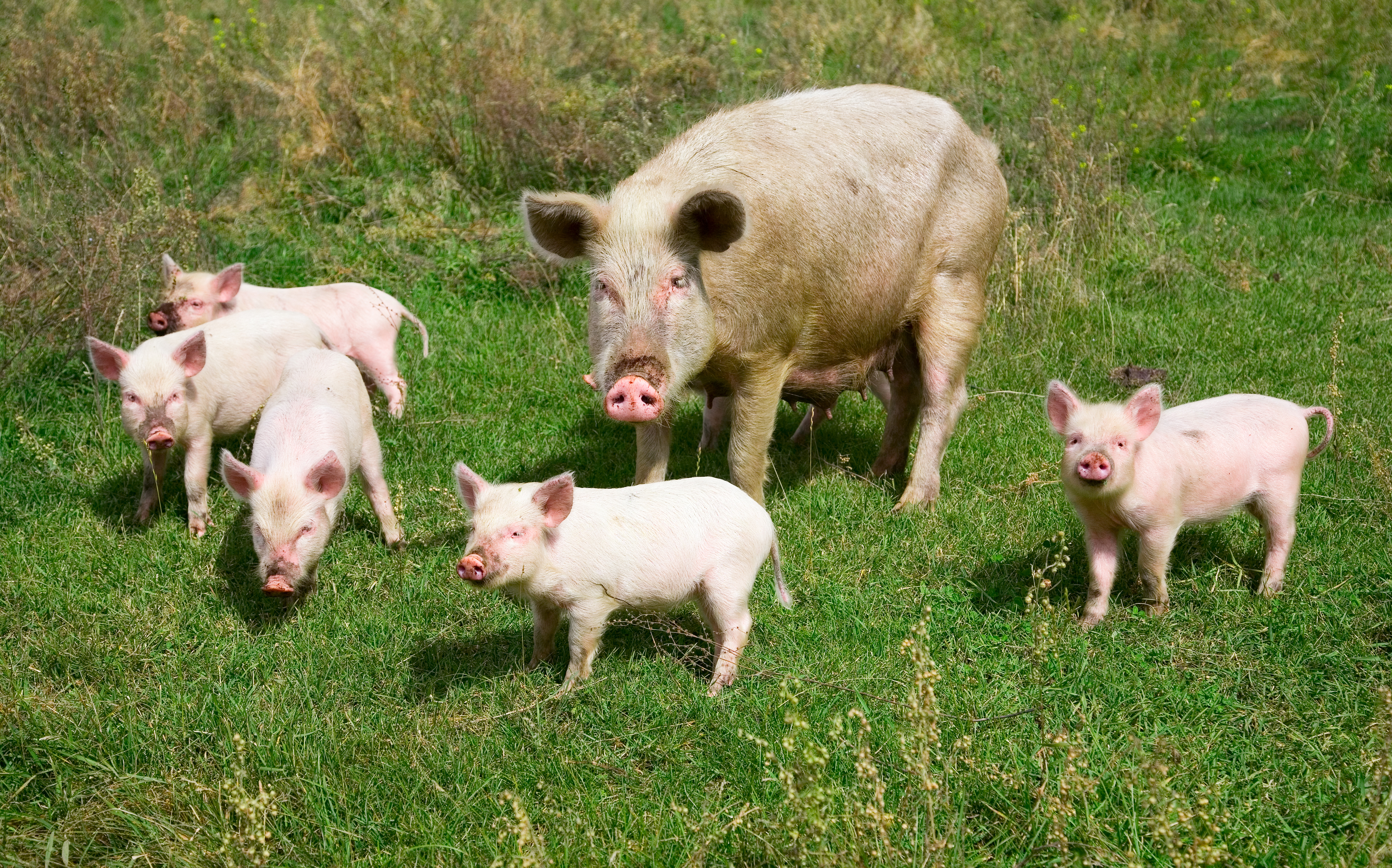
Ortolyk village in the Altai mountains

== Communication ==
Similarly to other highly intelligent mammals, pigs demonstrate an understanding of symbolic language. In one study, pigs showed they could grasp gestures and verbal symbols representing both objects (frisbee, ball, and dumbbell) and actions (sit, fetch, and jump). They learned more than objects and verbs; they also understood phrases, such as "fetch the frisbee", and successfully performed requested tasks apparently as well as dolphins do.

In the Middle Ages pigs were often held in communal corrals. Each pig owner had a horn tuned to a different pitch so that pigs were able to identify the call of the owner and come back.

Pigs can discern where human attention is focused and, much like dogs, pass the human pointing test. The pointing test is known to be difficult as even great apes struggle, being outperformed by dogs.

== In interactions and relationships ==
=== Emotional intelligence ===
Studies show pigs feel emotional states from other pigs, a phenomenon called emotional contagion. In response to negative feelings in other pigs, they are able to provide social support. Like dogs, pigs seek comfort from pet owners when stressed.

Lulu, a pet potbellied pig, was motivated to seek help when her owner suffered a heart attack. The pig got outside the house and occupied the road, then went back to the house, repeating this behavior until a car stopped and Lulu led the driver to her owner, who was finally saved.

=== Social intelligence ===
Pigs can remember which humans and pigs they like and act accordingly. They differentiate humans, even people dressed alike, by recognizing human faces, and can also tell apart humans by their olfaction and hearing. Pigs have been shown to fear strangers but to have lost that fear after the person played with the pigs using toys.

=== Theory of mind ===
Pigs can use their knowledge of other pig perspectives to their own advantage and even to influence others' behavior. In one study, pigs used their theory of mind skills to mislead other pigs away from food rewards. Like corvids and primates, pigs are capable of tactical deception. Pigs can figure where humans are looking and pointing.

== Personality ==
A study discovered that piglets exhibit unique traits in (at least) the three areas of aggression, sociability, and exploration; these parallel the human personality dimensions of agreeableness, extraversion, and openness. Most farmers recognize in pigs traits such as intelligence, stubbornness, friendliness and gluttony.

== In spatial navigation ==
=== Problem solving ===
Both chimpanzees and pigs are capable of understanding that a joystick can be used to direct a pointer in a screen. According to one study, pigs outperformed dogs at directing the pointer towards a target.

Pigs can use their problem solving skills to free other pigs from cage traps.

=== Self-awareness ===
The mirror test is one way to observe self-aware behaviors in animals. When pigs are presented a mirror, they do repetitive movements, a behavior called contingency checking. Moreover, they are able to locate food using the mirror.

=== Spatial memory ===
Pigs can remember and selectively return to areas with more food, showing they have spatial memory and understanding of quantities.

=== Time perception ===
In a study, pigs were given a choice between two crates, each linked to a different duration of confinement. The pigs consistently favored the crate associated with the shorter confinement, indicating that they could use their previous experience on time perception to predict future outcomes.

=== Tool use ===
An endangered pig species, Sus cebifrons, has been observed to use different tools to dig and to use hard surfaces to break sticks.

== See also ==
- Dog intelligence
- Cat intelligence
- Cetacean intelligence
- Animal cognition
- Bird intelligence
- Elephant cognition
- Primate cognition
