= G factor in non-humans =

Common measure of general cognitive ability

The g factor, or general factor, of intelligence is a psychometric construct that summarizes observed correlations between an individual's scores on various measures of cognitive abilities. First described in humans, a g factor has since been identified in a number of non-human species.

Non-human models of g have been used in genetic and neurological research on intelligence to help understand the mechanisms behind variation in g.

== Methods ==
Most measures of g in humans, including most IQ tests, rely heavily on language and verbal ability, and so they cannot be directly applied to non-human animals. Several alternative measures have been developed to study intelligence in animals, relying on the observation of animals in natural situations or on behavioral tasks in experimental settings. The tasks focus on such things as innovation and problem solving, response to novelty, habit reversal and inhibition, and social learning and culture. A comprehensive assessment often includes a battery of tests involving several sorts of behavior.

=== Innovation & problem solving ===
Innovation and problem solving tasks are the most widely used experimental measures of non-human intelligence. The same assessment often uses several tasks, which may involve memory, spatial reasoning, visual and auditory discrimination, and object manipulation. Innovation has often been observed in animals, typically involving novel solutions to everyday problems or the use of tools to achieve a goal. Instances include termite fishing in chimpanzees or nut cracking in robust capuchins. Such observations provide ecologically valid measures without the need for experimentation.

=== Response to novelty ===
Response to novelty is often used in intelligence measures in human infants, for the amount of interest in novel objects and the time spent exploring a novel environment correlate with intelligence later in life. Responses to novelty in non-humans are thought to correlate similarly, though it can often be difficult to quantify this measure appropriately.

=== Habit reversal & inhibition ===
Habit reversal and inhibition are commonly used to test primate intelligence. These tasks require the animal to suppress a learned response or instinctive action in order to receive a reward. For example, in the detour problem, a food reward behind an obstacle must be retrieved by following an indirect route. To do this, the subject must inhibit its tendency to move straight towards the goal.

=== Social learning ===
A number of intelligence tests for animals include social learning. The more an individual participates in and gains from social learning, the higher its intelligence is judged to be. Such data are most widely available for primates in social situations, often in wild populations, rather than experimental set-ups Such observations are more ecologically valid than some other measures. One basis for their inclusion in IQ studies centers around the theory of cultural intelligence.

== g in non-human mammals ==
A large portion of the research into non-human g factors has focused on mammals. Being mammals themselves, humans have a great deal in common with other mammals, sharing similarities in aspects such as physiology and neurochemistry. Social learning and culture may have played a large role in the evolution of intelligence in humans (including its factor structure) and as such it follows that other animals may have similar single-factor models of intelligence.

=== Primates ===
Due to their close taxonomic proximity to humans, primates (great apes in particular) have been the focus of a large part of the research into the prevalence of a g factor in non-human animals.

A meta-analysis of 4,000 primate behaviour academic papers searching for instances of innovation, social learning, tool use, and extractive foraging was conducted to investigate the components of these behaviours in 62 species of primates. A principal component analysis of these cognitive measures (as well as three socio-ecological variables, (diet breadth, percentage fruit in diet, and group size) revealed a single factor explaining 47% of the variance onto which the cognitive measures and diet breadth (somewhat) loaded. This would suggest that non-human primates, as a whole, have a g factor similar to that observed in humans.

=== Rodents ===
Mice and rats have been used as model organisms in research for hundreds of years and have been a staple of experimental psychology for decades. Both have been proposed as easily accessible models for studying g. The g factor loadings in Long-Evans rats has been shown to range from .43 to as high as .70 in cognitive ability tasks. In mice, about 55–60% of the individual variance in tests of cognitive ability can be explained by g.

== Applications ==
=== Genetic research ===
Non-human models of intelligence can be used in individual differences research for study designs that are difficult or unethical to perform using human subjects. Examples of this include experimental drug testing and multi-generational studies that would take a very long time in humans.

One such aspect of intelligence well suited for a non-human model is the experimental study of genetic aspects of g. Mice are currently being considered as a potential model due to their widespread availability, detailed knowledge of their genome, and the ease with which strains can be bred to exhibit individual differences in cognitive ability.

=== Neuroscience ===
Non-human models can also be used in neuroscience for neuroanatomical studies investigating intelligence and the influence of g on the neurological level. Rats have been used in experimental manipulations of intelligence using chemicals administered prenatally. These effects are partially reversed by stimulation of neurological development and suggest that neuronal and synaptic numbers have an effect on g.

== Criticism ==
A 2012 study identifying individual chimpanzees that consistently performed highly on cognitive tasks found clusters of abilities instead of a general factor of intelligence. This study used individual-based data and claim that their results are not directly comparable to previous studies using group data that have found evidence for g. The authors propose a future research should test multiple individuals of multiple species on a variety of tasks to investigate this discrepancy.

A 2020 review and meta-analysis of g in non-humans found that the average correlation between cognitive tasks was 0.18, suggesting weak support for general intelligence. This study also highlighted limitations of factor-analytic procedures used to extract a single 'general' factor of intelligence and found that previous studies often failed to test critical assumptions of their methods. The authors suggest that future research should focus on patterns of (co)variance among cognitive abilities.

== See also ==
- g factor
- Intelligence
- Animal cognition
- Primate cognition
