= Instinctive drift =

Tendency of an animal to revert to unconscious and automatic behaviour

Instinctive drift, alternately known as instinctual drift, is the tendency of an animal to revert to unconscious and automatic behaviour that interferes with learned behaviour from operant conditioning. Instinctive drift was coined by Keller and Marian Breland, former students of B.F. Skinner at the University of Minnesota, describing the phenomenon as "a clear and utter failure of conditioning theory." B.F. Skinner was an American psychologist and father of operant conditioning (or instrumental conditioning), which is a learning strategy that teaches the performance of an action either through reinforcement or punishment. It is through the association of the behaviour and the reward or consequence that follows that depicts whether an animal will maintain a behaviour, or if it will become extinct. Instinctive drift is a phenomenon where such conditioning erodes and an animal reverts to its natural behaviour.

== B.F. Skinner ==
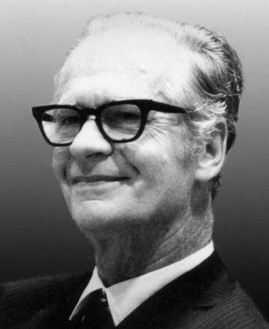
B.F. Skinner, American psychologist credited for understanding of operant conditioning associated with instinctive drift

B.F. Skinner was an American behaviourist inspired by John Watson's philosophy of behaviorism. Skinner was captivated with systematically controlling behaviour to result in desirable or beneficial outcomes. This passion led Skinner to become the father of operant conditioning. Skinner made significant contributions to the research concepts of reinforcement, punishment, schedules of reinforcement, behaviour modification and behaviour shaping. The mere existence of the instinctive drift phenomenon challenged Skinner's initial beliefs on operant conditioning and reinforcement.

=== Operant conditioning ===
Skinner described operant conditioning as strengthening behaviour through reinforcement. Reinforcement can consist of positive reinforcement, in which a desirable stimulus is added; negative reinforcement, in which an undesirable stimulus is taken away; positive punishment, in which an undesirable stimulus is added; and negative punishment, in which a desirable stimulus is taken away. Through these practices, animals shape their behaviour and are motivated to perform said learned behaviour to optimally benefit from rewards or to avoid punishment. Through operant conditioning, the presence of instinctive drift was discovered.

== The Brelands ==
The term instinctive drift was coined by married couple Keller and Marian Breland Bailey, former psychology graduate students of B.F. Skinner at the University of Minnesota. Keller and Marian were recruited to work with B.F. Skinner on a project to train pigeons to pilot bombs towards targets to aid with World War II efforts. This project was terminated when the development of the atom bomb took precedence. The Brelands, however, still enthralled with the application of animal behaviour, adopted Skinner's principles and began a life of training animals. They profited from these animals performing complex and amusing behaviours for the public's entertainment. They coined their successful business, "Animal Behaviour Enterprises" in 1943. Their business soon gained nationwide attention and even had a partnership with General Mills to train chickens, via operant conditioning, for business promotion.

== Discovery ==
Keller and Marian Breland were the discoverers of instinctive drift. They first noted this behavioural pattern when animals they had been training for years interrupted their learned behaviours to satisfy innate patterns of feeding behaviours. This discovery debunked the once assumed ideas that animals are a "tabula rasa" prior to purposeful training and that all responses are equally conditionable. The Breland's described their first exposure to this phenomenon when working with their chickens that had been trained to appear as if they were turning on a jukebox and subsequently dancing. The breakdown in operant conditioning appeared when over half the chickens they had trained to stand on a platform developed an unplanned scratching or pecking pattern. The scratching pattern was subsequently used to create the "dancing chicken" performance.

== In raccoons ==
The Breland's had their second, and more perplexing, encounter with instinctive drift when working with raccoons. They were training racoons to perform a captivating sequence of events to aid with the advertisement of a bank. This project involved teaching raccoons to deposit money into a bank slot. The Breland's were successful at yet another animal training project as raccoons were initially very successful at the task of depositing coins into the bank. The Brelands then noticed that over time and as the reinforcement schedule was spaced out, the raccoons began to dip the coins in and out of the bank and rub them with their paws rather than depositing them. They concluded that this was an instinct that was interfering with the raccoons’ performance on the task. In nature, raccoons dip their food in water several times in order to wash it. This is an instinct which was seemingly triggered by the similar action sequence involved in retrieving and depositing coins into a bank. Instinctive behaviour is usually automatic and unplanned and is a natural reaction which often is preferred by the animal over learned and unnatural actions. This instinctual drift was successfully avoided when they instead taught the raccoons to place a basketball into a basket. Because of the size of the ball and the different body position involved in this action, the raccoons did not experience instinctual drift (they did not dip the balls in and out of the basket).

== In pigs ==
A similar training regimen was applied on pigs, animals who are known to condition rapidly. These pigs were trained to insert wooden coins into a piggy bank. Over time, the pigs stopped depositing the coins and instead began to drop it in the dirt, push it down with their noses, drag it back out, and fling it into the air. This is a series of actions which are part of a behaviour known as rooting. It is an instinctual pattern of behaviour which pigs use to dig for food and to communicate. The pigs chose to engage in rooting rather than performing their trained action (depositing the coin) and therefore, this is yet another clear example of instinctive drift interfering with operant conditioning.

== Nature vs. nurture ==
The nature vs. nurture controversy is a major topic discussed in psychology and pertains to animal training as well. Both sides of the nature vs. nurture debate have valid points and this controversy is one of the most debated in psychology. A common question asked today by many experts in various fields is if behaviour is due to life experiences or if it is predisposed in DNA. Today, partial credit is given to both sides and in many cases nature and nurture are given equal weight. With animal training it is often questioned if the training and shaping is the cause of a behaviour exhibited by an animal (nurture), or if the behaviour is actually innate to the species (nature). Instinctive drift centers around the nature of behaviour more so than learning being the sole cause of a behaviour. Species are obviously capable of learning behaviours, this is not denied in instinctive drift. Instinctive drift says that animals often revert to innate (nature) behaviours that can interfere with conditioned responses (nurture).

== Relationship with evolution ==
Instinctive drift can be discussed in association with evolution. Evolution is commonly classified as change occurring over a period of time. Instinctive drift says that animals will behave in accordance with evolutionary contingencies, as opposed to operant contingencies of their specific training. Evolutionary roots of instinct exist. Evolution of traits and behaviours occur over time and it is by means of evolution and natural selection that adaptive traits and behaviours are passed on to the next generation and maladaptive traits are weaned out. It is the adaptive traits of species over time that is exhibited in instinctive drift and that species revert to that interferes with operant conditioning. Much knowledge on the topic of evolution and natural selection can be credited to Charles Darwin. Darwin developed and proposed the theory of evolution and it was through this knowledge that other subjects could be better understood, such as instinctive drift.
