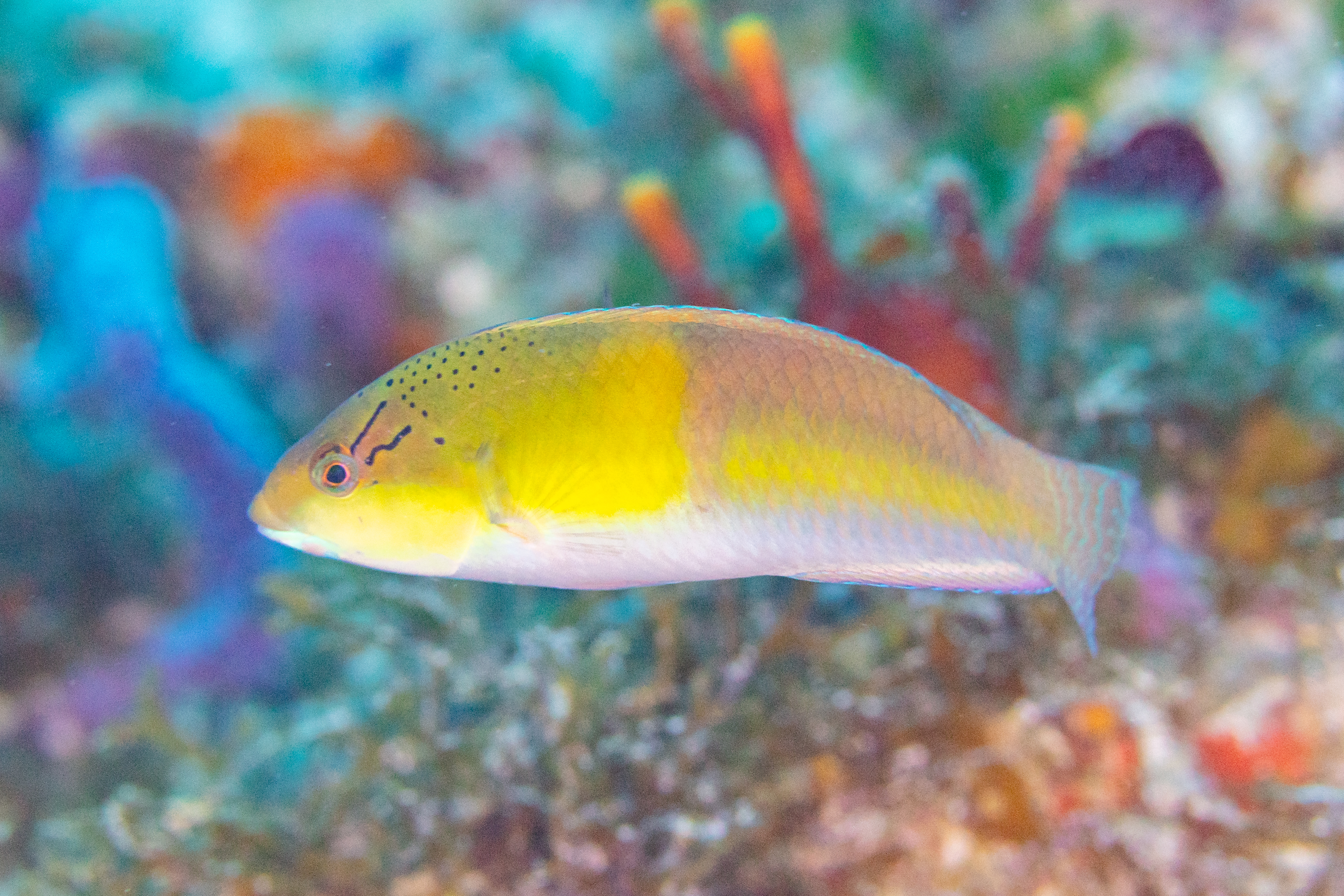
- In Cozumel (Mexico)

Conservation status
- Least Concern (IUCN 3.1)

Scientific classification
- Kingdom: Animalia
- Phylum: Chordata
- Class: Actinopterygii
- Order: Labriformes
- Family: Labridae
- Genus: Halichoeres
- Species: H. garnoti

Binomial name
- Halichoeres garnoti (Valenciennes, 1839)

Synonyms
- Julis garnoti Valenciennes, 1839

= Yellowhead wrasse =

Species of fish

The yellowhead wrasse (Halichoeres garnoti) is a fish species belonging to wrasse family native to shallow tropical waters in the Caribbean Sea and western Atlantic Ocean.

== Description ==
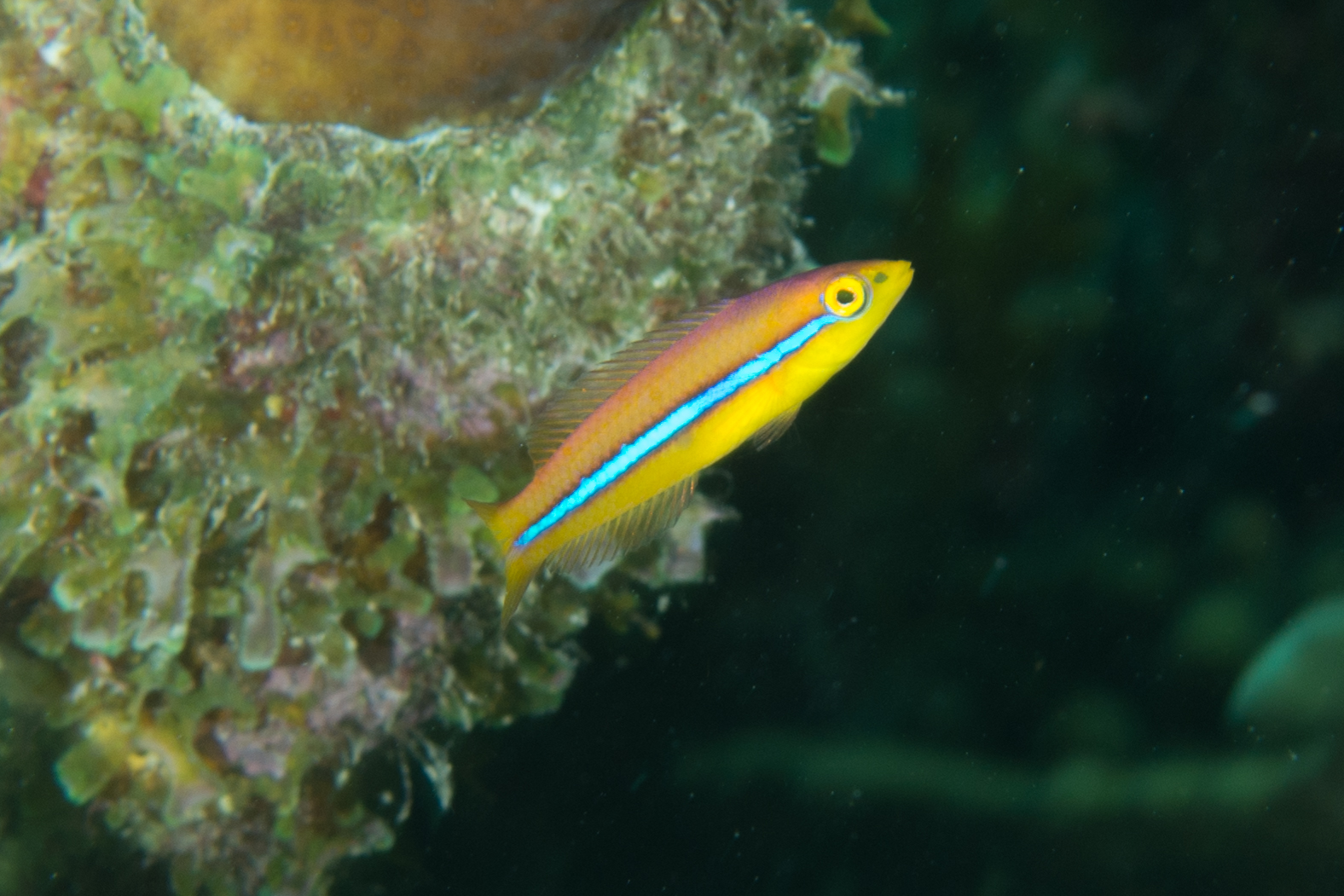
Juvenile

The yellowhead wrasse is a small sized fish that can reach a maximum length of 19 cm (7.5 in). Both its sex and appearance change during its life and the colouring at each stage is rather variable. The body is thin, relatively lengthened and its mouth is terminal. As a juvenile, it is mainly yellow with a lateral, bright-blue stripe.

In its initial phase, while it is female, it has a dark-colored back, sometimes with bluish shadings, and a yellow underside. Two short wavy dark lines radiate from the hind edge of each eye with dark spots on its front head.

Later, as an adult male, the head and front part of the body are yellow, the hind half of the body is silvery grey and a vertical black blue bar and a broad black blue stripe occur along the border of the dorsal fin. From this dark blue line, three longitudinal lines of gradient colors are visible, they are successively green, blue (this latter continues throughout the ventral part of the fish) then pink to mauve color. It still has the characteristic dark, wavy lines near the eye with the black spots.

== Distribution and habitat ==
The yellowhead wrasse is widespread throughout the tropical and subtropical waters of the western Atlantic Ocean, the Caribbean Sea, and the Gulf of Mexico south to the north coast of Venezuela.

The yellowhead wrasse is common on coral and sandy reefs and among rocks at depths down to about 60 m (200 ft). It likes places with many small cavities where it can hide in case of danger.

== Biology ==
The yellowhead wrasse is a predator that feeds mainly on small invertebrates such as crustaceans, molluscs, worms and echinoderms captured on the substrate or in the sand. Its prominent teeth help it to grasp crustaceans and to lever prey items off rocks. During its juvenile phase, this wrasse can behave like a cleaner fish.

Like many other wrasses, the yellowhead wrasse is a protogynous hermaphrodite, starting life as a female and later becoming a male, changing sex when it is about 7 cm (2.8 in) long. Mature males are territorial during the breeding season and gather in a lek. A daily migration from feeding grounds to spawning sites occurs, and large males tend to monopolize mates.

== Status and threats ==
It is targeted for the aquarium trade, but it is not thought to be a major threat. This species is listed as Least Concern (LC) on the IUCN Red List.
