= Marian Breland Bailey =

American psychologist (1920–2001)

- Born: Marian Ruth Kruse; December 2, 1920; Minneapolis, Minnesota, U.S.
- Died: September 25, 2001 (aged 80); Hot Springs, Arkansas, U.S.
- Education: University of Minnesota
- Occupations: Psychologist; animal trainer; behavioral scientist
- Known for: Pioneer in humane animal training
- Spouses: Keller Breland (m. 1941; died 1965) Robert E. Bailey (m. 1976)
- Children: 3
- Scientific career
- Fields: Psychology

Marian Breland Bailey (born Marian Ruth Kruse; December 2, 1920 – September 25, 2001) was an American psychologist, an applied behavior analyst who played a major role in developing empirically validated and humane animal training methods and in promoting their widespread implementation. She and her first husband, Keller Breland (1915–1965), studied at the University of Minnesota under behaviorist B. F. Skinner and became "the first applied animal psychologists." Together they wrote the book Animal Behavior which was first published in 1966, after Keller's death.

== Childhood and education ==
Born to Christian and Harriet (Prime) Kruse, Marian Ruth Kruse grew up in Minneapolis, Minnesota. Christian, a German immigrant, worked for an automotive supply store, and Harriet was a registered nurse. Bailey's father and then others called her "Maus" ("mouse"), a common German nickname for little girls. After graduating from Washburn High School as her senior class's valedictorian, Bailey went to the University of Minnesota to major in Latin and minor in Greek. Although financial times were difficult as her family had lost everything during the banking collapse of the Great Depression, a full scholarship and a Works Progress Administration award for writers supported her undergraduate education.

Before long, she also became a research assistant for B. F. Skinner. To meet a science requirement, Bailey took psychology because, as she later explained, "I thought it the least painful science." As a straight-A student, she was recommended for a highly selective psychology class taught by Skinner (the first of what Skinner later called "pro-seminars"), under whom she studied along with George Collier, W. K. Estes, Norman Guttman, Kenneth MacCorquodale, Paul Everett Meehl, and others bound for later fame in their field. With its emphasis on Skinner's new operant training techniques, the course inspired Bailey to major in psychology with a minor in child psychology and to study operant conditioning.

Bailey worked as Skinner's teaching and laboratory assistant when he published his pivotal work The Behavior of Organisms in 1938. She trained rats for Skinner, typed lecture notes for him, proofread his book, and even babysat his children. Skinner gave her the final galley proof of his book, which she considered a prized possession. While still an undergraduate student, Bailey met her future husband Keller Breland, who came to call her "Mouse" without knowing that her family called her "Maus". Bailey and others soon decided that her name was Mouse.

In 1940, Bailey joined Psi Chi, the national honor society in psychology. She graduated with her Bachelor of Arts degree summa cum laude in 1941, the only member of her graduating class with an A average.

== Work with Keller Breland ==
Keller Breland
- Pioneer in humane animal training
- Born: March 26, 1915; Poplarville, Mississippi
- Died: June 17, 1965 (aged 50); Hot Springs, Arkansas

After Bailey earned her bachelor's degree, she married psychologist Keller Bramwell Breland (1915–1965) on August 1, 1941. Together, they had three children: Bradley (1946), Frances (1948), and Elizabeth (1952).

Bailey became the second graduate student to work under the renowned Skinner. Her husband soon came to work with Skinner as well. While graduate students, they collaborated with Skinner on military research during World War II. Their work involved training pigeons for use by the U.S. Navy, teaching the birds to guide bombs. This was never actually used. Although many sources incorrectly refer to the work as Project Pigeon or the Pigeon Project, Bailey assured colleagues that its name had actually been "Pigeon in a Pelican", with pelican referring to the missile each pigeon was to guide.

Bailey and Breland saw the commercial possibilities of operant training. So they left the University of Minnesota without completing their doctorates, and founded Animal Behavior Enterprises (ABE) on a farm in Minnesota. Skinner tried to dissuade the couple from abandoning their graduate education for an untested commercial endeavor. Classmate Paul Meehl bet $10 they would fail. (His 1961 check for $10 later hung framed on Bailey's office wall.)

ABE's first project was training farm animals to appear in feed advertisements for General Mills. Bailey and Breland went on to train "more animals and different species of animals than any other animal trainers" of their time, including animals of the land (cats, cattle, chickens, dogs, goats, pigs, rabbits, raccoons, rats, and sheep), the air (ducks, parrots, and ravens), and the sea (dolphins and whales). At their busiest, they trained "more than 1,000 animals at a given time". In training animals for recreational facilities such as Marineland of Florida, Parrot Jungle, SeaWorld, and Six Flags, they created the very first dolphin and bird shows, a form of program now considered traditional entertainment fare. Most major theme parks' animal programs can be traced back to the couple's pioneering work. They also established the first coin-operated animal shows. The Buck Bunny commercial featured their trained rabbits for a Coast Federal Savings television ad that ran for twenty years and which still holds the record for longest running TV commercial advertisement. They trained animals for many other venues including circuses, motion pictures, museums, stores, and zoos.

Earlier animal trainers had historically relied primarily on punishment when teaching animals. Bailey and Breland instead followed Skinner's emphasis on the use of positive reinforcement to train animals, using rewards for desired behavior. Although other students of Skinner's later entered commercial animal training as well, the pair's techniques dominated the field because they found ways to simplify the training of complex behaviors. The couple did not just train the animals. They also trained other animal trainers, establishing in 1947 "the first school and instruction manual for teaching animal trainers the applied technology of behavior analysis." Marlin Perkins of Wild Kingdom and Walt Disney were among those who learned from them.

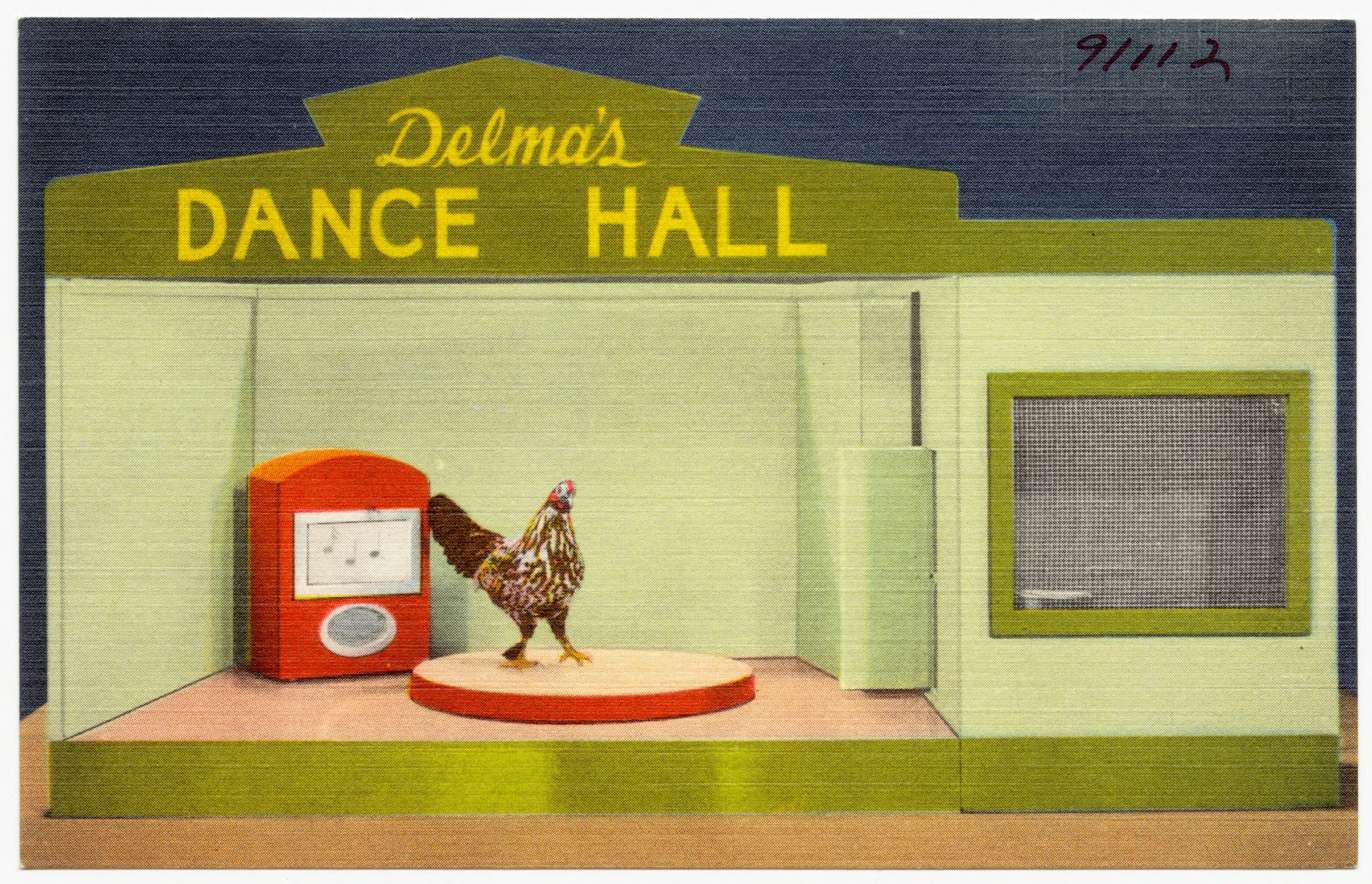
Postcard from I.Q. Zoo

Bailey led ABE's government research, some of which remains classified to this day. Known projects included the development of an avian ambush detection system. In 1950, Bailey and Breland relocated ABE to a farm near Hot Springs, Arkansas. In 1955, they opened the "I.Q. Zoo" in Hot Springs as both a training facility and a showcase of trained animals. "Popular acts included chickens that walked tightropes, dispensed souvenirs and fortune cards, danced to music from jukeboxes, played baseball and ran the bases; rabbits that kissed their (plastic) girlfriends, rode fire trucks and sounded sirens, and rolled wheels of fortune; ducks that played pianos and drums; and raccoons that played basketball."

Bailey and Breland were also "the first to introduce the public to the applied technology of behavior analysis via numerous personal appearances at fairs, exhibitions, and theme parks across the country". They appeared on well known television shows such as The Today Show, The Tonight Show, Wild Kingdom, and You Asked For It. Publications including Colliers, Life, Popular Mechanics, Reader's Digest, Saturday Evening Post, Time, and even The Wall Street Journal featured them and their work. Although Breland was often the public face of ABE with some ads referring to "Keller Breland's I.Q. Zoo," both of them collaborated equally in ABE's endeavors.

The couple stirred controversy among behaviorists with their 1961 article, "The misbehavior of organisms" – the title of which involved a play on words referring to Skinner's The Behavior of Organisms. Bailey and Breland outlined training difficulties in which instinct or instinctive drift might occur as tendencies biologically inherent in a species intrude into the behaviors a trainer was attempting to teach an animal. The article is recognized as a milestone in the history of psychology.

In 1963, Bailey designed and implemented a program to improve techniques for working with profoundly mentally retarded individuals at a human development center in Alexandria, Louisiana. She emphasized the value of positive reinforcement, and taught ward attendants humane practices that became the standard for institutions of this kind. The 1965 training manual Teaching the Mentally Retarded, which she and others prepared, remained in use for decades.

On June 17, 1965, Breland died of a heart attack. In their 1966 textbook, Bailey described him as the "dreamer" and herself as the "engineer". She continued writing, researching, and training animals.

== Work with Bob Bailey ==
In 1976, she married Robert E. Bailey. He had been the first Director of Training in the Navy's Marine Mammal Program, then became ABE's General Manager. The two of them had founded the facility "Animal Wonderland" in 1972. Among their many activities, the Baileys worked with the Canine Companions for Independence nonprofit organization which trained dogs to assist disabled individuals. Together, the Baileys trained animals from over 140 species.

In the 1970s, the couple produced over a hundred units of "Bird Brain", a coin-operated device involving a chicken and a primitive computer playing tic-tac-toe.

Her graduate studies had stopped when she and Breland left to found ABE. She returned to graduate school and earned her PhD in psychology at the University of Arkansas in 1978. She then served as a professor of psychology at Henderson State University from 1981 until her retirement in 1998. During these years, the Baileys produced educational films on topics such as the history of behaviorism. Their film work included The History of Behavioral Analysis Biographies, the ABE documentary Patient Like the Chipmunks, and An Apple for the Student: How Behavioral Psychology Can Change the American Classroom.

Bailey continued writing about the "misbehavior" of animals during operant conditioning for publications such as American Psychologist, the official journal of the American Psychological Association (APA). The Baileys were chief among the behaviorists who began using the Internet for instruction, problem solving, and promotion of their science.

In 1996, the Baileys began the Bailey & Bailey Operant Conditioning Workshops, which provided training to animal trainers, psychologists, students, and many others from throughout the world. The program of study involved four increasingly advanced levels of the "physically, mentally, and emotionally demanding" workshops. In 1998, the University of Arkansas inducted Bailey into the university's Fulbright College Alumni Academy as one of their first Distinguished Alumni Award recipients. On September 25, 2001, Bailey died at St. Joseph's Hospital in Hot Springs.

== Remembering Mouse ==
After Bailey's death, numerous professionals in the field recognized her death with obituaries and biographies. Dr. Art Gillaspy and Dr. Elson Bihm of the University of Central Arkansas wrote an obituary for the American Psychologist. Psi Chi's journal Eye on Psi Chi honored Bailey, who had been a member for over sixty years, with a biography by Dr. Todd Wiebers of Henderson State. The year after her death, the Arkansas Historical Quarterly featured a retrospective on Bailey, who had been a figure in the state of Arkansas for decades. Her husband Bob provided a biographical tribute for the Division 25 Recorder, the official publication of the APA's Division 25 for Behavior Analysis. Other obituaries and biographies have appeared online.

In her name, Henderson State University presents the Marian Breland Bailey Endowed Scholarship in Psychology to select psychology undergraduates. Memorial contributions in Bailey's memory go to this scholarship and to the Arkansas Kidney Foundation.

Bailey's husband Bob continued to teach seminars they developed and the Bailey & Bailey Operant Conditioning Workshops which they began together.

The Archives of the History of Psychology in Akron, Ohio, and the Smithsonian Math and Science Museum in Washington, D.C., now house collections of Bailey's documents and items.
