= Fox 3 =

Fox 3 may refer to:

== Military ==
- Active radar homing missile, also referred to as the "fox three" missile type
- Fairey Fox III, a British interwar biplane bomber
- Fox three, a brevity code used by NATO pilots; see Fox (code word)

== Other uses ==
- Fox-3, the gene for coding the Hexaribonucleotide Binding Protein-3
- RNA binding protein, fox-1 homolog (c. elegans) 3 encoded by the gene FOX3

== See also ==
- Channel3Now, formerly known as Fox3Now, a Pakistani crime news website
- Fox Sports 3
- Fox (disambiguation)
