= Adult neurogenesis in songbirds =

Adult neurogenesis is the process in which new neurons are born and subsequently integrate into functional brain circuits after birth and into adulthood. Avian species including songbirds are among vertebrate species that demonstrate particularly robust adult neurogenesis throughout their telencephalon, in contrast with the more limited neurogenic potential that are observed in adult mammals after birth. Adult neurogenesis in songbirds is observed in brain circuits that underlie complex specialized behavior, including the song control system and the hippocampus. The degree of postnatal and adult neurogenesis in songbirds varies between species, shows sexual dimorphism, fluctuates seasonally, and depends on hormone levels, cell death rates, and social environment. The increased extent of adult neurogenesis in birds compared to other vertebrates, especially in circuits that underlie complex specialized behavior, makes birds an excellent animal model to study this process and its functionality. Methods used in research to track adult neurogenesis in birds include the use of thymidine analogues and identifying endogenous markers of neurogenesis. Historically, the discovery of adult neurogenesis in songbirds substantially contributed to establishing the presence of adult neurogenesis and to progressing a line of research tightly associated with many potential clinical applications.

== Mechanism ==
=== General mechanism ===
New neurons are born on the walls of the lateral ventricles (ventricular zone) and migrate to their destination where they integrate into the existing circuits. Neurogenesis occurs throughout the ventricular zone, but proliferation is especially high in specific locations in the lateral wall of the ventricle. Radial glia, a subset of vimentin-expressing glial cells that are the adult neural stem cells, reside in the dorsal and ventral ventricular zone and extend long processes that permeate the neural tissue. Radial glia asymmetrically divide to give rise to new neurons. Neurons born in the ventricular zone first migrate tangentially along the ventricular zone, then radially on radial glia processes to their destination. However, there is evidence that another form of migration is also in place. Indeed, some newborn neurons have been shown to undergo non-radial glia accommodated migration, where they do not move on the radial glia processes but rather "wander" around in a diffusion-like manner until they reach their destination.

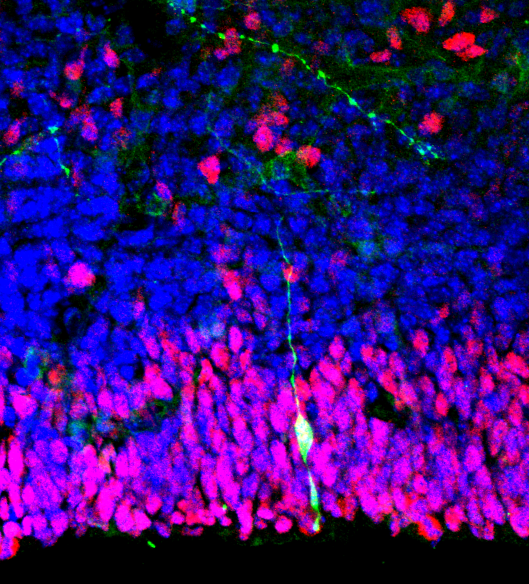
Neural stem cell (radial glia) shown in green

=== Adult neurogenesis in different systems ===
Adult neurogenesis in the avian brain occurs in many different pallial and subpallial regions, including the song nuclei, the hippocampus, and the olfactory regions. Even though adult neurogenesis is widespread across the telencephalon, all the regions where it is especially high are associated with the learning of new information, suggesting a possible function of adult neurogenesis to be offering an additional avenue of plasticity required during learning.

==== Neurogenesis in the song system ====
Although the recruitment of new neurons is widespread in the avian telencephalon, songbirds exhibit particularly robust postnatal and adult neurogenesis in their song control system nuclei. The song control system is found exclusively in oscine birds and is responsible for the learning and production of songs. Neurogenesis observed in the song system brain areas is shown to be associated with the learning of new songs. Neurogenesis in songbirds was first identified and has been most well studied in the song control system.

===== Song system circuit =====
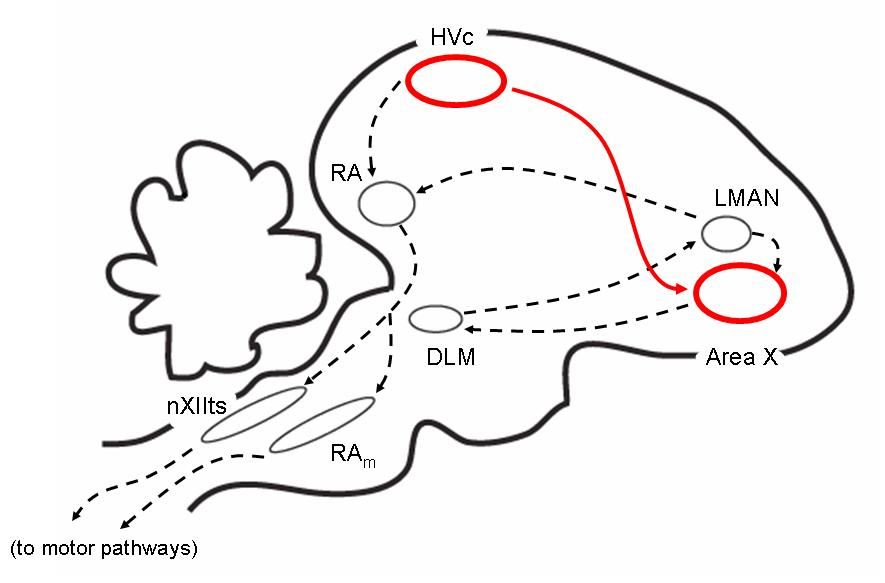
Schematic of the brain areas that are part of the songbird song system

The song control system of songbirds consists of a collection of specialized brain areas (nuclei) that are involved in the learning and production of song. Those include the HVC (former "Higher Vocal Center", now HVC used as the proper name), a nucleus located in the posterior nidopallium, the nucleus robustus arcopallialis (RA), also located in the nidopallium, and Area X, a structure comparable to the mammalian striatum.

The song control system is divided into two main pathways: the motor pathway (or caudal pathway) and the anterior forebrain circuit. The motor pathway is responsible for song production. It includes projections from the HVC to the RA, and subsequently to parts of the medulla that control the syrinx (the songbird vocal organ) and respiration via the hypoglossal nucleus (nXIIts). Lesions in this pathway in adult birds lead to impaired song production. The anterior forebrain pathway is responsible for song learning and plasticity. It consists of projections from the HVC to Area X, then DLM, LMAN, and concludes in RA. In addition, LMAN also projects independently to RA, and this input is thought to be responsible for song variability. Lesions in this pathway in juvenile birds leads to impaired song learning.

===== Mechanism and migration =====
Adult neurogenesis in the song control system nuclei is shown to be restricted to neurons in Area X, and the neurons of HVC projecting to RA. On the contrary, the neurons of HVC projecting to Area X do not regenerate and are born before hatching. There is also some evidence to suggest a regenerating interneuron population in the HVC. Most of the newborn neurons that migrate to the HVC fail to differentiate and integrate, but the ones that do survive in the circuit for a long time.

==== Neurogenesis in the hippocampus ====
Adult neurogenesis also occurs in the hippocampal formation of songbirds. Postnatal neurogenesis in the avian hippocampus is especially prominent in species of songbirds that engage in seasonal food-caching behavior, such as the titmice and chickadees. Indeed, hippocampal neurogenesis among these species is strongly associated with memory demands related to food-storing and -retrieval. Hippocampal adult neurogenesis in chickadees seems to occur through neuronal turnover rather than a general increase in the number of neurons. This process of neural replacement is highly influenced by seasons and coincides with the increasing demand for food-caching behavior. For instance, new neurons that are specifically born in early autumn are more likely to integrate into the existing circuit and survive longer than new neurons born other times of the year. It has been suggested that the seasonal modulation of hippocampal neurogenesis among food-caching songbirds is mediated by photodriven endogenous timers. Conversely, it has also been suggested that the novel experiences brought upon by the change in season is the primary driver of the hippocampal neurogenic processes in songbirds.

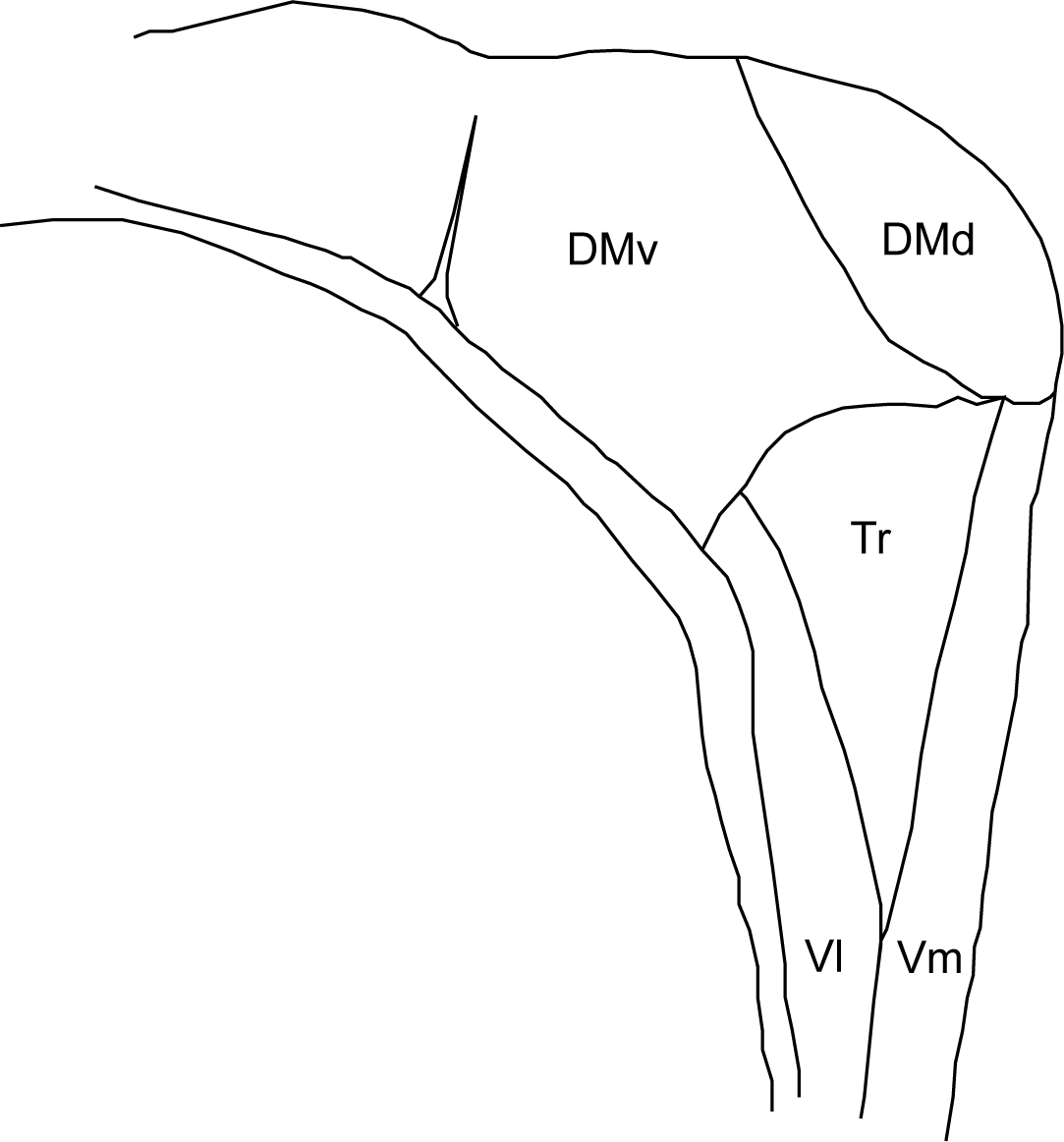
Schematic of avian hippocampus formation, containing the ventral dorsomedial region (DMv), the dorsal dorsomedial region (DMs), the triangular region (Tr) and the V-shaped region, divided into lateral (Vl) and medial (Vm).(Adapted from Barnea et al., 2012)

===== Avian hippocampus =====
The avian hippocampus is a forebrain structure subdivided into the V-shaped, the dorsomedial (DM), the dorsolateral (DL), and the triangular region (Tr). Even though there are substantial structural differences between the mammalian hippocampus and the avian hippocampus, there is evidence for subregion homology based on connectivity, gene expression patterns and development. A dominant homology model describes the V-shaped region of the avian hippocampus as homologous to the mammalian dentate gyrus (DG) and the DM region homologous to the cornus ammonis (CA).

==== Compensatory neurogenesis ====
Compensatory neurogenesis occurs in response to injury of neural tissue. In the songbird, ablation of brain regions that physiologically undergo neurogenesis is shown to trigger enhanced restorative waves of neurogenesis, eventually restoring the singing behavior itself. The restorative mechanism is limited to the types of neurons that normally regenerate, namely the HVC neurons that projects to RA and the HVC interneurons. In contrast, the HVC neurons that project to area X do not undergo replacement in instances of ablation.

=== Factors underlying mechanism of adult neurogenesis in the songbird song system ===
There are many factors shown to underlie adult neurogenesis in the song control systems in juvenile and adult songbirds (described in the sections below). Overall, the amount of postnatal and adult neurogenesis in songbirds varies between species, shows sexual dimorphism, fluctuates seasonally, and depends on hormone levels, cell death rates, and social environment.

==== Hormones and neurotrophic factors ====
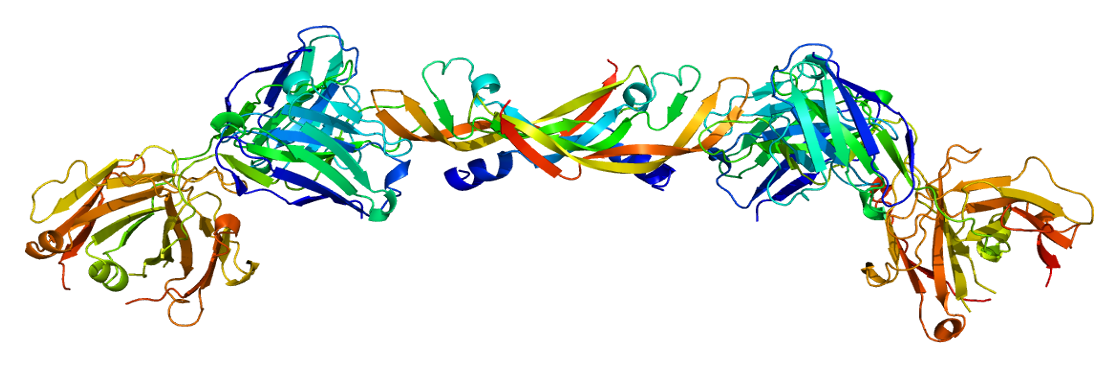
Structure of VEGFA trophic factor.

Singing behavior and the song control system structures show high sexual dimorphism. Male songbirds sing more and have more song syllable variation than their female conspecifics. In parallel, their HVC and RA nuclei are considerably larger than in females. This dimorphism is shown to be under control of sex steroids: the song nuclei in male songbirds have high levels of testosterone and its metabolites, as well as restricted expression of the estrogen receptor ERα. Additionally, testosterone administration to female canaries leads to increased singing and enlarged HVC and RA. Testosterone however does not seem to enhance rate of proliferation itself, but rather the survival and integration success of already born neuroblasts. Furthermore, seasonal waves of neuron proliferation precedes peaks in testosterone, so neurons born during these waves benefit from the testosterone survival effects.

The effect of testosterone on new neuron survival however is not direct, but mediated by neurotrophic factors. Testosterone treatment increases levels of brain-derived neurotrophic factor (BDNF) in HVC, which in turn increases survival of newly generated HVC neurons. However, this effect is observed only when BDNF is administered between 14 - 20 days after neuronal birth. The proposed pathway is that testosterone is aromatized by brain aromatase to estradiol, which in turn increases expression of trophic factor VEGF and its receptor Quek1/VEGFRR2 in the endothelial cells. This results in local angiogenesis, as the number of endothelial cells and capillary diameter increases. VEGF binding on the increased endothelial VEGFRR2 receptors stimulates BNDF upregulation, which in turn increases new neuron survival.

==== Genes ====
Genes related to angiogenesis or neurogenesis and migration related cytoskeletal rearrangements (e.g. neurite growth) are upregulated in neurogenic areas in the songbird brain. Many neurotrophins, including BDNF, IGF-1, and VEGF are highly expressed in seasons when adult neurogenesis in the HVC peaks.

FoxP2 (Forkhead box protein 2) is a transcription factor that in the songbird is associated with song learning. In the adult songbird brain, the adult-born neurons of Area X are intensely expressing FoxP2. Expression of FoxP2 in Area X neurons has an inverse relationship with testosterone levels. In the context of neurogenesis, FoxP2 is shown to play a role in cytoskeletal rearrangement, spine and dendrite formation. Knockdown of FoxP2 expression in young songbirds results in impaired song learning and reduced spine density, especially when the intervention occurs at the neural stem cell stage.

Other proteins that are upregulated in cells undergoing neurogenesis include proteins that are associated with DNA replication and mitosis. PCNA (proliferating cell nuclear antigen) is a protein that is expressed during DNA replication, and it is associated with DNA polymerase A activity.

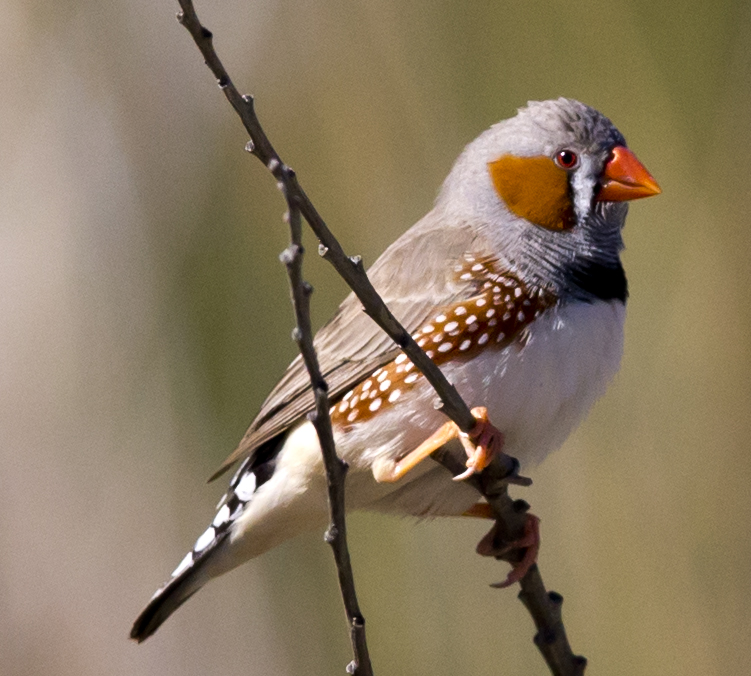
Figure 4: Male zebra finch (Taeniopygia guttata), an example of a sensitive period learner

Example of a zebra finch song

==== Species ====
Songbird species vary in their way of learning and modifying their songs. There are two types of learners: sensitive period learners (or "closed" learners) and open-ended learners (or "open" learners). The former, like chaffinches or zebra finches, learn their songs from a tutor during a time period in early life and show little modifications to it later in life, whilst the latter, like canaries, change their song each breeding season. Although there is adult neurogenesis throughout the lifespan of both types of learners, the amount of HVC neuron turnover is substantially higher in the "open" learners, reflecting the higher plasticity of their song.

==== Seasonality ====
Adult neurogenesis rates and new neuron survival in the song circuit closely follow breeding patterns. In particular, they follow the peaks and troughs of testosterone and its metabolites as the seasons alternate between breeding season in late winter/early spring, and non-breeding season. In the song sparrow for example, the HVC neuron number can increase from about 15000 neurons in the fall to 250000 neurons during spring. Right before breeding season, there is an increase of testosterone levels, followed by an increase in BDNF. This trophic cascade promotes new neuron survival (see above: Hormones and neurotrophic factors) leading to an increase in the HVC total neuron number during breeding season and the production of stereotyped song. At the end of breeding season, testosterone levels decrease leading to an increase of death of mature HVC neurons that lose their trophic support from the testosterone trophic cascade. Cell death of mature HVC neurons creates physical space for the addition of new neurons in the next breeding season.

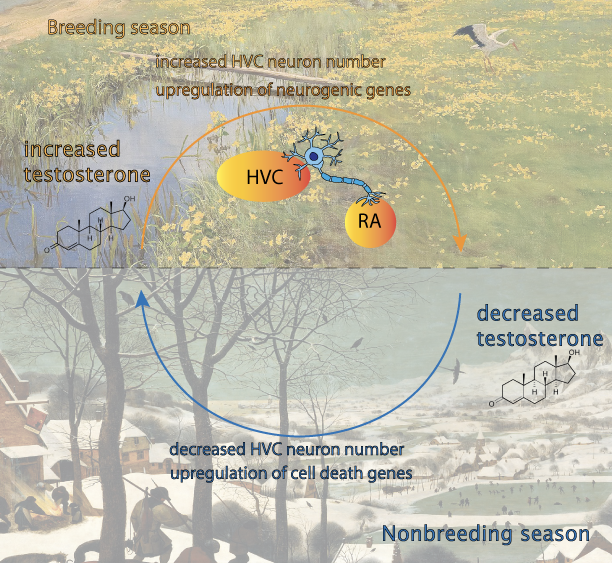
Schematic of seasonal fluctuations of testosterone levels in the HVC and how they modulates survival of newborn RA projecting HVC neurons.(Adapted from Brenowitz and Larson, 2015)

==== Cell death ====
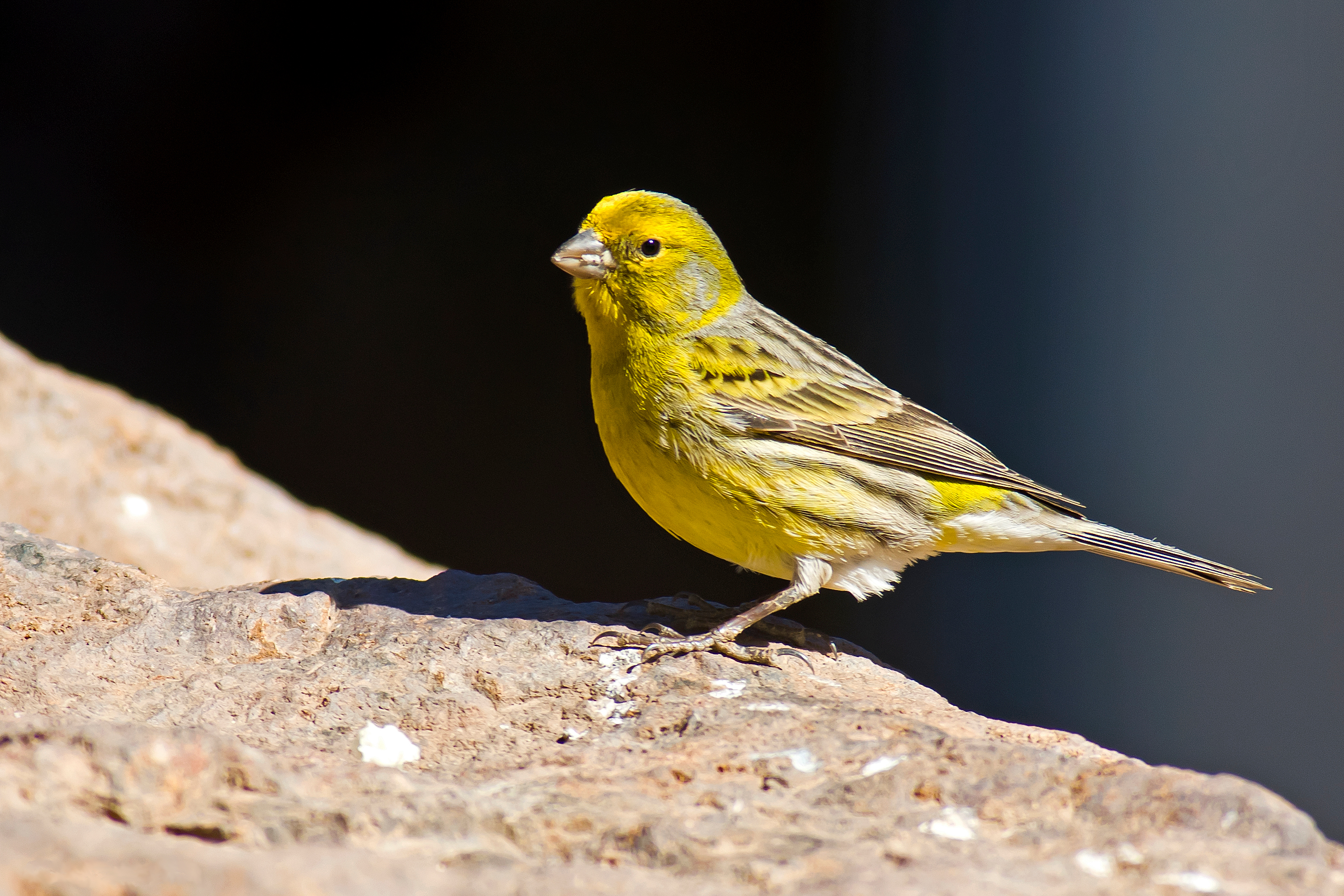
Male canary (Serinus canaria) , an example of an open-ended learner

Neuronal addition to the song circuit nuclei is directly related to older neurons dying and creating vacancies. Increase in adult neurogenesis and neuronal addition to the HVC follow periods of apoptosis prompted by drops in testosterone and trophic factor levels such that the amount of neuronal addition is proportional to the amount of neuronal death that preceded it. A noteworthy observation however is that this relationship between cell death and increased neurogenesis is only true for cells that are usually able to regenerate: HVC neurons projecting to the RA, but not the ones projecting to Area X, undergo cell turnover following apoptosis.

==== Age ====
Example of a canary song

In most songbird species, adult neurogenesis in the HVC decreases with age such that juvenile birds have higher levels of adult neurogenesis in terms of cell proliferation and survival than older birds. The degree of that difference however is species-dependent.

==== Social environment ====
Different social environments during early life can have an effect on the level of adult neurogenesis in the HVC. Male zebra finches that are housed separately during their early life show decreased adult neurogenesis in the HVC and Area X compared to socially reared male zebra finches during the sensitive period. However, social environment can extend the sensitive period of singly housed male zebra finches, such that they can still learn a new song if a tutor becomes available after the time period when in socially reared zebra finches the song is already crystallized. The expansion of the sensitive period is reflected in the increased number of new neurons in the HVC in the singly housed birds.

== Research ==
=== Animal models ===
Many different songbird species are used to study adult neurogenesis as it relates to singing and other behaviors. The diversity of species used in this line of research reflects the broad spectrum of adult neurogenesis patterns within the songbird suborder (Passeri). Species that are typically used in this line of research include canaries, zebra finches, chickadees, and white-crowned sparrows.

=== Techniques ===
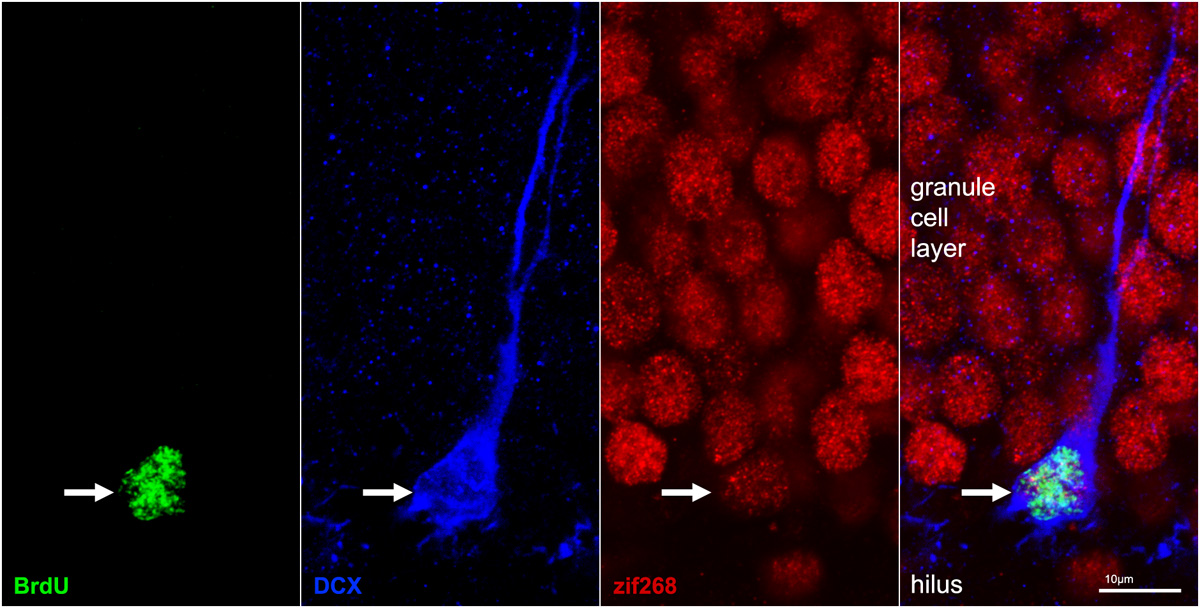
Example of BrdU staining (in green) of radial glia cells expressing doublecortin (DCX - in blue)

==== Thymidine analogues ====
===== ^{3}H-thymidine =====
The use of ^{3}H-thymidine (triated thymidine) is one of the first methods used in the late 1950s to track cell progeny. ^{3}H-thymidine incorporates into the DNA of dividing cells during the S-phase of mitosis, and so can label dividing cells and their progeny allowing the determination of their origin location and birth date via autoradiography. However, tracking neurogenesis using tritiated thymidine is especially challenging in both attaining the labeling and analyzing the results.

===== BrdU =====
An alternative for tracking neurogenesis is the synthetic thymidine analogue BrdU (5-bromo-3'-deoxyuridine) which also incorporate into the DNA of dividing cells during the S-phase and concentrate in the cell nuclei. The main advantages of this technique over using ^{3}H-thymidine is that BrdU can be visualized using immunohistochemistry, avoiding the need for autoradiography and thus the exposure to radioactivity, and that they are much less time consuming. The labeling can be detected months after, and can be quantified semiautomatically in image analysis. In birds, the incorporation of BrdU into replicating DNA happens within the first 30 to 60 minutes after injections, which is a shorter window than in rodents due to differences in metabolism and body temperature. BrdU became the "gold standard" of newborn neuron tracking due to it being fast, cheap, and safe to use. It can be combined with staining of other proteins or mRNA to additionally describe the cells. There is still ongoing research to determine the BrdU injection dosage that is needed to label all the diving cells at a given time, but it varies with the species and sex. Additionally, BrdU is known to also incorporate into the nuclei of cells undergoing DNA repair - this leads to questions about how many of the labeled cells are undergoing neurogenesis and not DNA repair cause by BrdU-induced damages.

===== Other thymidine analogues =====
Some more recent thymidine analogues that are also used for tracking cell progeny include EdU, IdU (iodo-deoxyuridine), and CldU (chloro-deoxyuridine). The bromide atom in BrdU is replaced by iodine (IdU), chloride (CldU), or an organic molecule (EdU). CldU and IdU labeling is also detected via immunohistochemistry, but the antibodies used for their detection are chemically similar, making co-labeling of BrdU/IdU/CldU not possible. Edu however is visualized using a fluorescent tag that is added via a CLICK reaction. EdU labeling has the additional advantage of requiring a simplified protocol that does not include the need for DNA denaturation, unlike BrdU/CldU/IdU labeling.

==== Endogenous markers of neurogenesis ====
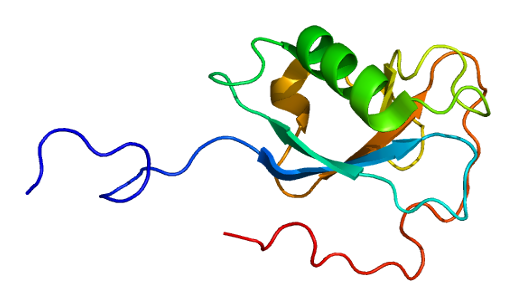
Structure of the DCX protein

Using endogenous markers of neurogenesis, i.e. proteins expressed during some phase of the neurogenesis process, is another approach to identify new neurons. These proteins might be related to DNA replication, migration, or cell identity, and might be specific to immature or mature neurons accordingly. Antibodies that have been used in birds include NeuN, Hu, PCNA, pHH3, and DCX.

DCX (doublecortin) is one of the most commonly used protein target when describing neurogenesis. As a protein that binds to microtubules, it has an essential role in the cytoskeletal reorganization that takes place during neuron migration, including during adult neurogenesis. DCX has been shown to be expressed in all the avian brain regions that are known to undergo adult neurogenesis.

Antibodies can target proteins that are upregulated during the cell replication part of the cell cycle, like PCNA or pHH3. PCNA (proliferating cell nuclear antigen) is a protein that is expressed during DNA replication, and it is associated with DNA polymerase A activity. It can be used to identify cells that are undergoing or just went through cell replication and it is highly conserved in vertebrates, allowing its usage in birds. pHH3 (phospho-histone H3) is a histone protein that is phosphorylated at serine-10 and serine-28 during cell replication. Targeting the phosphorylated form of this protein with antibodies is a way to evaluate neurogenesis levels. pHH3 has also been used in birds to target proliferating cells.

NeuN ("Neuronal Nuclei") is an antibody used to label the nuclei of mature neurons, so it can be used to distinguish those from immature neuron progenitors. Hu is an RNA-binding protein that is specific to neurons. It is used to distinguish newborn cells with neuronal fate, rather than glial fate.

Identifying endogenous markers of neurogenesis that would work in birds is challenging due to most of these markers having been identified and used mostly in rodents. Thus, any antibodies need to have an established bird homologue. This requires rigorous genome comparisons and immunohistochemical tests. The use of in situ hybridization to label the corresponding mRNA is also a good way of identifying gene expression.

Endogenous and Exogenous Markers of Neurogenesis
| | Name | Type | Mechanism | Detection Method |
|---|---|---|---|---|
| ^{3}H-thymidine | triated thymidine | (exogenous) thymidine analogue | incorporates into DNA of proliferating cells during S-phase | autoradiography |
| BrdU | 5-bromo-3'-deoxyuridine | (exogenous) thymidine analogue | incorporates into DNA of proliferating cells during S-phase | antibody staining/ immunohistochemistry |
| EdU | 5-Ethynyl-2'-deoxyuridine | (exogenous) thymidine analogue | incorporates into DNA of proliferating cells during S-phase | fluorescent tag by CLICK reaction |
| CldU | chloro-deoxyuridine | (exogenous) thymidine analogue | incorporates into DNA of proliferating cells during S-phase | antibody staining/ immunohistochemistry |
| IdU | iodo-deoxyuridine | (exogenous) thymidine analogue | incorporates into DNA of proliferating cells during S-phase | antibody staining/ immunohistochemistry |
| DCX | doublecortin | (endogenous) protein or mRNA | involved in cytoskeletal reorganization during neurogenesis and migration | antibody staining/ immunohistochemistry or in situ hybridization |
| PCNA | proliferating cell nuclear antigen | (endogenous) protein or mRNA | associated with polymerase A activity during cell replication | antibody staining/ immunohistochemistry or in situ hybridization |
| pHH3 | phospho-histone H3 | (endogenous) protein | phosphorylated form is upregulated during replication | antibody staining/ immunohistochemistry |

==== Genetic tools and in vivo microscopy ====
An important aspect of adult neurogenesis is the way in which the new neurons migrate from their place of birth in the ventricular zone to their target brain region. Recent advances in genetic tools and in vivo microscopy allow for the visualization of neuronal migration in the HVC of songbirds. Specifically, retroviruses are used to selectively express green fluorescent protein (GFP) in the new neurons of the zebra finch forebrain. This provides a way to evaluate the migratory patterns of these neurons in vivo using multi-photon microscopy.

== Clinical relevance ==
Many research on adult neurogenesis in vertebrates aim at improving cell replacement therapies used for stroke- and spinal cord-related injury, or for the treatment of neurodegenerative disorders. For example, studying the molecular characteristics of the RA projecting HVC neurons that are able to regenerate in adulthood can give insight on how to approach designing similar heavily myelinated premotor neurons that are relevant in spinal cord-related injury that can incorporate seamlessly in the damaged circuits. Additionally, due to the proposed homology between Area X neurons and human striatal spiny neurons, and given the regeneration ability of the former, there might be a promising translational research direction for treatment of Huntington's disease where those exact striatal spiny neurons are undergoing degeneration.

Songbirds in particular provide a valuable animal model in which complex learned behavior is maintained over time despite the constant replacement of neurons in the relevant brain areas. Indeed, it has been proposed that adult neurogenesis in the hippocampus may play a central role in regulating the maintenance of long-term memory and the capacity to learn new information in birds and other higher vertebrates, including mammals. It has also been shown in mammals that dysregulation of hippocampal adult neurogenesis is implicated in various neurological diseases and mood disorders, including Parkinson's disease, Alzheimer's disease, anxiety, depression, and epilepsy. Using avian animal models to investigate hippocampal neurogenesis can provide insight into the functionality of adult neurogenesis in memory but also the involvement of this process' dysregulation in disease. Additionally, the song control circuit offers an opportunity to evaluate brain-behavior connections in a system that directly relates to a quantifiable behavior (song learning) that has parallels to human speech learning and basal ganglia motor skill learning. The presence of robust adult neurogenesis in this avian circuit and behavioral context allows for the investigation of ways to manipulate adult neurogenesis with therapeutic potential for humans.

== History ==
The discovery of adult neurogenesis in the songbird during the late twentieth century had a pivotal role in reversing the long-held dogma that brain cells are fixed in numbers after birth. The first relevant studies in adult canaries (1960s) were conducted in the context of studying singing behaviors and the way different species of songbirds learn their songs, as well as the extent to which this song is subject to change over the course of their lifetime. Early studies mainly included experiments of cochlear removal to induce deafening, denervation of the syrinx (vocal organ of birds), and lesions of brain areas that belong to the song system, including the HVC and the robust nucleus of the acropallium (RA). All these studies offered important insight into the brain areas involved in the song system pathway, as well as the plasticity and functional lateralization of learned songs. A key discovery that first hinted to fluctuating neuron numbers was that there was a differentiation between the size of song nuclei of males in comparison to the females, with males having much larger HVC and RA nuclei.

The difference in size of the song nuclei was eventually attributed partly to longer dendrites and more synapses in males and testosterone-treated females, but mostly to the addition of new neurons in these structures. Using ^{3}H-thymidine, a marker widely used to label newborn cells, it was determined that there were labeled cells in the lateral ventricle walls which were then shown to migrate to the HVC and integrate in the existing circuits. Many of those cells were determined to be neurons in subsequent electrophysiological and immunohistochemical experiments, and in particular interneurons and HVC neurons projecting to the RA. Further experiments investigated the effects of seasonality, hormones and existing neuronal cell death on the levels of neuronal recruitment and replacement in the avian song system nuclei.

The discovery of adult neurogenesis in the song system prompted further research that showed that there is widespread adult neurogenesis in the avian telencephalon.

== See also ==
- Neurogenesis
- Neuroplasticity
- Trophic factor
