= RNA binding protein fox-1 homolog 3 =

Gene of the species Homo sapiens

RBFOX3

Identifiers
- Aliases: RBFOX3, FOX-3, FOX3, HRNBP3, NEUN, RNA binding protein, fox-1 homolog 3, uncharacterized LOC644767
- External IDs: OMIM: 616999; MGI: 106368; GeneCards: RBFOX3

Gene location (Mouse)
Chr.	Chromosome 11 (mouse)
Band	11 E2|11 83.22 cM	Start	118,489,762 bp
Band	11 E2|11 83.22 cM	End	118,911,597 bp
Gene ontology
Molecular function	DNA binding; mRNA binding; RNA binding; nucleic acid binding
Cellular component	cytoplasm; perikaryon; soma; intracellular anatomical structure; nucleus
Biological process	regulation of RNA splicing; mRNA processing; regulation of alternative mRNA splicing, via spliceosome; RNA splicing; nervous system development
Sources:Amigo / QuickGO
Orthologs
Databases	NCBI: entry; OMA: entry
Species	Human	Mouse
Entrez	146713	52897
Ensembl	ENSG00000167281	ENSMUSG00000025576
UniProt	A6NFN3; K7EJX6	Q8BIF2
RefSeq (mRNA)	NM_001039904	NM_001024931; NM_001039167; NM_001039168; NM_001285436; NM_001285437 NM_001285438
RefSeq (protein)	NP_001076044; NP_001337380; NP_001337382	NP_001020102; NP_001034256; NP_001034257; NP_001272365; NP_001272366 NP_001272367
Location (UCSC)	n/a	Chr 11: 118.49 – 118.91 Mb
PubMed search
- Wikidata
View/Edit Human	View/Edit Mouse

RNA binding protein fox-1 homolog 3 (RBFOX3) is a protein that in humans is encoded by the RBFOX3 gene. It is related to the alternative splicing factors Rbfox1 and Rbfox2, but instead of its involvement in splicing, it is most well known as the nuclear biomarker NeuN.

== See also ==
- NeuN
- Rbfox1 and Rbfox2
- Alternative splicing
