= C5H5N5 =

The molecular formula C_{5}H_{5}N_{5} (molar mass: 135.13 g/mol, exact mass: 135.0545 u) may refer to:

- Adenine
- 2-Aminopurine
