= Nucleic acid notation =

Universal notation of DNA nucleotides

The nucleic acid notation currently in use was first formalized by the International Union of Pure and Applied Chemistry (IUPAC) in 1970. This universally accepted notation uses the Roman characters G, C, A, and T, to represent the four nucleotides commonly found in deoxyribonucleic acids (DNA).

Given the rapidly expanding role for genetic sequencing, synthesis, and analysis in biology, some researchers have developed alternate notations to further support the analysis and manipulation of genetic data. These notations generally exploit size, shape, and symmetry to accomplish these objectives.

== Single nucleobase and nucleoside ==
IUPAC degenerate base symbols
Description	Symbol	Bases represented					Complementary bases
Description	Symbol	No.	A	C	G	T	Complementary bases
Adenine	A	1	A				T
Cytosine	C	1		C			G
Guanine	G	1			G		C
Thymine	T	1				T	A
Uracil	U	1				U	A
Weak	W	2	A			T	W
Strong	S	2		C	G		S
Amino	M	2	A	C			K
Ketone	K	2			G	T	M
Purine	R	2	A		G		Y
Pyrimidine	Y	2		C		T	R
Not A	B	3		C	G	T	V
Not C	D	3	A		G	T	H
Not G	H	3	A	C		T	D
Not T (Note: Not U for RNA)	V	3	A	C	G		B
Any one base	N	4	A	C	G	T	N
Gap	-	0					-

Under the commonly used IUPAC system, nucleobases are represented by the first letters of their chemical names: guanine, cytosine, adenine, and thymine. This shorthand also includes eleven "ambiguity" or "degenerate" characters associated with every possible combination of the four DNA bases. The ambiguity characters were designed to encode positional variations in order to report DNA sequencing errors, consensus sequences, or single-nucleotide polymorphisms. The IUPAC notation, including ambiguity characters, is shown in Table 1.

Degenerate base symbols in biochemistry are an IUPAC representation for a position on a DNA sequence that can have multiple possible alternatives. These should not be confused with non-canonical bases because each particular sequence will have in fact one of the regular bases. These are used to encode the consensus sequence of a population of aligned sequences and are used for example in phylogenetic analysis to summarise into one multiple sequences or for BLAST searches, even though IUPAC degenerate symbols are masked (as they are not coded).

Symbols for degenerate bases are chosen from the remaining characters of the Roman alphabet with logical mnemonics. Strong and weak are expressed by their initial letter, while amino, keto, purine, pyrimidine, and any are expressed by a letter from the stressed or otherwise prominent syllable. The triply-degenerate ("not X") letters are simply the next letter from the excluded letter.

=== Additional bases ===
The 1970 standard also provides a three-letter nomenclature for nucleobases, derived simply from the first three letters of the trivial name (Ade for adenine, Hyp for hypoxanthine). Nucleosides are denoted by replacing the last letter with another; there is not a very particular pattern.

The 1970 standard also included I for inosine, X for xanthosine, and Ψ for pseudouridine. It also allowed the use of any other letter for rare nucleosides if seen fit, although it recommends that B be reserved for 5-bromouridine, S for thiouridine, D for 5,6-dihydrouridine, and O for orotidine. Of these four reservations, only O and D are somewhat commonly used in later literature. DNA bases are denoted with these symbols with a "d" prefix, e.g. dA, dG.

The 1970 standard specifies a complete syntax for modified bases. Modifications should be written in a lowercase letter; some predefined ones include "m" for methyl, "h" for dihydro, "n" for amino. The location of the substitution is written as a superscript, and in case of multiple substitutions at the same site it is written with a subscript. As a result, m^{6}A means N^{6}-methyladenosine and m^{6}_{2}A means N^{6}-dimethyladenosine. The same modification at separate sites can be written in two ways: both m^{1,6}_{2}A and m^{1}m^{6}A mean 1,N^{6}-dimethyladenosine.

The 1970 standard also specifies a syntax for modification to the sugar moiety (ribose or deoxyribose). Internal modification at the 2' position is to be written in lowercase after the capital letter for the nucleobase. Two common examples are Cm (2'-O-methylcytidine) and Gm (2'-O-methylguanosine) found in tRNA. This syntax can be used with the base modification syntax for results like m^{6}Am (2'-O-methyl-N^{6}-methyladenosine.

== Nucleic acid chain ==
Numbered ribose carbons on cytidine.

The positions of the carbons in the ribose sugar that forms the backbone of the nucleic acid chain are numbered, and are used to indicate the direction of nucleic acids (5'->3' versus 3'->5'). This is referred to as directionality. A nucleic acid sequence runs in the 5'->3' direction if not otherwise specified. This is the natural directionality of DNA and RNA synthesis; this is also the direction of mRNA reading by the ribosome. An opposite direction can be specified by writing e.g. (3'-5')A-C-A-C-A-C.

Additional modifying groups can be added by hyphenating with a prefix or suffix, in a way appropriate for the directionality above. Standard chemical abbreviations can be used. For example, (CNEt)-A-C-(Ph) has a 5' cyanoethyl group and a 3' phenyl group. A group bridging the 2' and 3' position is to be written as >. For example, A-C>p has a cyclic 2':3' phosphate cap.

== Legibility ==
Despite its broad and nearly universal acceptance, the IUPAC system has a number of limitations, which stem from its reliance on the Roman alphabet. The poor legibility of upper-case Roman characters, which are generally used when displaying genetic data, may be chief among these limitations. The value of external projections in distinguishing letters has been well documented. However, these projections are absent from upper case letters, which in some cases are only distinguishable by subtle internal cues. Take for example the upper case C and G used to represent cytosine and guanine. These characters generally comprise half the characters in a genetic sequence but are differentiated by a small internal tick (depending on the typeface). Nevertheless, these Roman characters are available in the ASCII character set most commonly used in textual communications, which reinforces this system's ubiquity.

Lowercase versions of the IUPAC letters are used in genetic sequence files. They indicate "soft masked" part of the sequence, usually repeats with uncertain length.

== Alternative visually enhanced notations ==
Legibility issues associated with IUPAC-encoded genetic data have led biologists to consider alternative strategies for displaying genetic data. These creative approaches to visualizing DNA sequences have generally relied on the use of spatially distributed symbols and/or visually distinct shapes to encode lengthy nucleic acid sequences. Alternative notations for nucleotide sequences have been attempted, however general uptake has been low. Several of these approaches are summarized below.

Comparisons below are based on the following multiple sequence alignment of a piece of the OB gene from Jarvius and Landegren (2006):

Human           CTTGCCCTGGGCCAGTGGCCTGGAGACCTTGGACAGCCTGGGG
Rhesus Monkey   TTTGCCCTTGGCCAGTGGCCTGGAGACCTTGGAGAGCCTGGGG
Wolf            CTTGCCCCGGGCCAGGGGCCTGGAGACCTTTGAGAGCCTGGGC
Conservation    .******. ****** ************** ** ********

=== Stave projection ===
The Stave Projection uses spatially distributed dots to enhance the legibility of DNA sequences.

In 1986, Cowin et al. described a novel method for visualizing DNA sequence known as the Stave Projection. Their strategy was to encode nucleotides as circles on series of horizontal bars akin to notes on musical stave. As illustrated in Figure 1, each gap on the five-line staff corresponded to one of the four DNA bases. The spatial distribution of the circles made it far easier to distinguish individual bases and compare genetic sequences than IUPAC-encoded data.

The order of the bases (from top to bottom, G, A, T, C) is chosen so that the complementary strand can be read by turning the projection upside down.

=== Geometric symbols ===
Zimmerman et al. took a different approach to visualizing genetic data. Rather than relying on spatially distributed circles to highlight genetic features, they exploited four geometrically diverse symbols found in a standard computer font to distinguish the four bases. The authors developed a simple WordPerfect macro to translate IUPAC characters into the more visually distinct symbols.

The Zimmerman system maps AGCT to █■∙♦ (tall rectangle, square, small circle, diamond) respectively. An example can be found in Zimmerman's 1993 paper on analyzing repeat sequences.

OB gene example rendered using Windows Glyph List 4 symbols:

 Human           ■♦♦∙■■■♦∙∙∙■■█∙♦∙∙■■♦∙∙█∙█■■♦♦∙∙█■█∙■■♦∙∙∙∙
 Rhesus Monkey   ♦♦♦∙■■■♦♦∙∙■■█∙♦∙∙■■♦∙∙█∙█■■♦♦∙∙█∙█∙■■♦∙∙∙∙
 Wolf            ■♦♦∙■■■■∙∙∙■■█∙∙∙∙■■♦∙∙█∙█■■♦♦♦∙█∙█∙■■♦∙∙∙■

=== DNA Skyline ===
With the growing availability of font editors, Jarvius and Landegren devised a novel set of genetic symbols, known as the DNA Skyline font, which uses increasingly taller blocks to represent the different DNA bases. Two fonts are provided: GATC where G is the tallest, and the complementary CTAG where C is the tallest. While reminiscent of Cowin et al.'s spatially distributed Stave Projection, the DNA Skyline font is easy to download and permits translation to and from the IUPAC notation by simply changing the font in most standard word processing applications.

OB gene example rendered using Symbols for Legacy Computing:

Human           🮅🮄🮄🮂🮅🮅🮅🮄🮂🮂🮂🮅🮅🮃🮂🮄🮂🮂🮅🮅🮄🮂🮂🮃🮂🮃🮅🮅🮄🮄🮂🮂🮃🮅🮃🮂🮅🮅🮄🮂🮂🮂🮂
Rhesus Monkey   🮄🮄🮄🮂🮅🮅🮅🮄🮄🮂🮂🮅🮅🮃🮂🮄🮂🮂🮅🮅🮄🮂🮂🮃🮂🮃🮅🮅🮄🮄🮂🮂🮃🮂🮃🮂🮅🮅🮄🮂🮂🮂🮂
Wolf            🮅🮄🮄🮂🮅🮅🮅🮅🮂🮂🮂🮅🮅🮃🮂🮂🮂🮂🮅🮅🮄🮂🮂🮃🮂🮃🮅🮅🮄🮄🮄🮂🮃🮂🮃🮂🮅🮅🮄🮂🮂🮂🮅

=== Ambigraphic notations ===
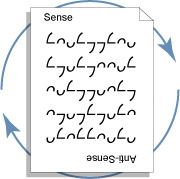
AmbiScript uses ambigrams to reflect DNA symmetries and support the manipulation and analysis of genetic data.

Ambigrams (symbols that convey different meaning when viewed in a different orientation) have been designed to mirror structural symmetries found in the DNA double helix. By assigning ambigraphic characters to complementary bases (i.e. guanine: b, cytosine: q, adenine: n, and thymine: u), it is possible to complement DNA sequences by simply rotating the text 180 degrees. An ambigraphic nucleic acid notation also makes it easy to identify genetic palindromes, such as endonuclease restriction sites, as sections of text that can be rotated 180 degrees without changing the sequence.

One example of an ambigraphic nucleic acid notation is AmbiScript, a rationally designed nucleic acid notations that combined many of the visual and functional features of its predecessors. Its notation also uses spatially offset characters to facilitate the visual review and analysis of genetic data. AmbiScript was also designed to indicate ambiguous nucleotide positions via compound symbols. This strategy aimed to offer a more intuitive solution to the use of ambiguity characters first proposed by the IUPAC. As with Jarvius and Landegren's DNA Skyline fonts, AmbiScript fonts can be downloaded and applied to IUPAC-encoded sequence data.

=== Other alternative notations ===
There are also 2D and 3D visualizations of individual nucleic acid letters as well as dinucleotide and trinucleotide sequences.

== Base pairing ==
Base pairing between two chains should be indicated by a "•" (example: A•T, or poly(rC)•2poly(rC)). "-" is not acceptable per IUPAC 1970 because it indicates a covalent bond. Neither ":" or "/" are deemed acceptable by IUPAC 1970 because they can be mistaken as ratios. Not using any symbol is also unacceptable because it can be confused with a polymer sequence. Nevertheless, "-", ":", "." are still seen in practice.

With Hoogsteen base pairing and similar pairing at a different "face" of the base, there is a need to differentiate between different type of hydrogen bonds. IUPAC has not made any recommendation for this situation, but "*" and ":" have been used.

== See also ==
- IUPAC for amino acids
- DNA replication
- Nucleotide
- Artificially Expanded Genetic Information System
