= CpG methyltransferase =

DNA methyltransferase enzyme

CpG Methyltransferase (M.SssI)

Identifiers
- EC no.: 2.1.1.37

Databases
- BRENDA: enzyme data
- ExPASy: NiceZyme view
- KEGG: enzyme entry
- MetaCyc: metabolic pathway
- Rhea: reactions
- PDB structures: RCSB PDB PDBe PDBsum
- Gene Ontology: AmiGO / QuickGO
Search
- PMC: articles
- PubMed: articles
- NCBI: proteins

M.SssI (EC 2.1.1.37) is a DNA (cytosine-5)-methyltransferase that methylates cytosine residues at the C^{5} position within the dinucleotide sequence 5'-CG-3' (commonly abbreviated as CpG). It originates from the bacterium Spiroplasma sp. strain MQ1. M.SssI methylates all CpG sites in DNA, regardless of their methylation status (unmethylated or hemimethylated). This enzyme utilizes S-adenosyl-L-methionine (SAM) as the methyl group donor. Due to its ability to methylate CpG sites with high efficiency, mimicking the patterns of DNA methylation found in higher eukaryotes, M.SssI is a frequently used tool in epigenetics research.

== Enzymology ==
M.SssI is a prokaryotic DNA methyltransferase that specifically recognizes the CpG dinucleotide. Unlike many bacterial methyltransferases that are part of a restriction modification system, M.SssI is often referred to as an "orphan" methyltransferase because its corresponding restriction enzyme in Spiroplasma has not been well-characterized or may not exist in a typical defense context. The enzyme is capable of methylating both strands of a CpG site. It can act on unmethylated DNA, introducing methylation de novo, and on hemimethylated DNA (where only one strand is methylated), thereby completing the methylation pattern.

Kinetic studies have shown that M.SssI methylates duplex DNA in a processive manner, meaning it can methylate multiple sites on a DNA molecule without dissociating after each catalytic event. This contrasts with some other prokaryotic cytosine DNA methylases, such as M.HpaII and M.HhaI, which tend to act distributively or with lower processivity. M.SssI interacts with duplex DNA irrespective of the presence of CpG sequences, suggesting extensive non-specific DNA binding, and then proceeds along the DNA, methylating one strand at a time.

In the absence of the methyl donor SAM, M.SssI has been shown to exhibit a secondary catalytic activity: the deamination of cytosine to uracil at CpG sites. This deaminase activity is significantly slower than its methyltransferase activity. The rate of this reaction can be increased by SAM analogues such as 5'-amino-5'-deoxyadenosine. However, M.SssI does not efficiently deaminate 5-methylcytosine (m5C).

== Structure ==
A high-resolution crystal structure of M.SssI complexed with DNA has not yet been published. However, structural insights have been gained through homology modeling, using the known structures of other DNA methyltransferases like M.HhaI and M.HaeIII as templates. These models predict amino acid residues involved in cofactor binding, target recognition (the CpG site), and catalysis. Like other C^{5}-cytosine methyltransferases, M.SssI is expected to utilize a common catalytic mechanism involving the flipping of the target cytosine out of the DNA helix and into the enzyme's active site.

Site-directed mutagenesis studies have identified some residues important for M.SssI function. For instance, substitutions in the presumed SAM binding pocket, such as F17S and G19D, have been shown to greatly reduce methyltransferase activity; the G19D variant also exhibited cytosine deaminase activity in E. coli even at physiological SAM concentrations. Replacement of Val188 with Ala (V188A) resulted in a decrease in both the dissociation constant of the enzyme-substrate complex and the initial velocity of DNA methylation, suggesting Val188 may participate in stabilizing the flipped target cytosine. Studies using DNA substrates with 2-aminopurine substitutions have indicated that the O^{6} group of the guanine adjacent to the target cytosine in the CpG site is crucial for the stability of the M.SssI-DNA complex and efficient methylation.

== Function ==
In its native host, Spiroplasma sp. strain MQ1, M.SssI likely functions as part of a restriction modification system (R-M system). In R-M systems, the methyltransferase modifies specific DNA sequences (in this case, CpG sites) by adding a methyl group. This methylation protects the host's own DNA from cleavage by its cognate restriction endonuclease, which would otherwise cleave unmethylated foreign DNA at these same recognition sites. However, M.SssI is often termed an "orphan" methyltransferase because a cognate restriction enzyme with the same specificity has not been definitively identified or characterized alongside it in Spiroplasma. Its function in Spiroplasma might be to protect its genome against endogenous or exogenous DNA cleavage.

== Applications ==
M.SssI is a valuable tool in molecular biology and epigenetics research due to its specific and complete methylation of all CpG dinucleotides in a DNA sequence. A primary application is in epigenetics studies, where M.SssI is used to create fully methylated DNA controls for methylation analysis experiments, such as bisulfite sequencing or methylation-sensitive restriction enzyme digestion. These controls allow researchers to validate their methods and to compare naturally occurring methylation patterns with a completely methylated state. Furthermore, M.SssI facilitates the study of CpG methylation's impact on gene expression by enabling the in vitro methylation of promoter regions or other regulatory elements, whose subsequent activity can be assessed in reporter assays or other functional studies.

The enzyme is also utilized for the inhibition of restriction endonucleases. Methylation of CpG sites by M.SssI can block the activity of those restriction endonucleases whose recognition sequences overlap with or include a CpG site and are sensitive to CpG methylation (such as HpaII and SmaI). This property can be exploited to selectively protect certain DNA regions from cleavage during cloning or DNA manipulation procedures.

In the study of DNA-protein interactions, in vitro methylation of DNA with M.SssI allows researchers to investigate how CpG methylation affects the binding of various proteins to DNA. This includes transcription factors, methyl-CpG-binding domain (MBD) proteins, and chromatin remodeling complexes. Additionally, M.SssI is employed in the preparation of uniformly [^{3}H]-labeled methylated DNA, which can serve as standards for quantifying methylation levels or for use in various biochemical assays.

M.SssI activity itself is a subject of investigation in the development of novel methylation assays, such as biosensors designed for detecting methyltransferase activity or for screening potential inhibitors of DNA methylation. Moreover, M.SssI has been engineered for targeted methylation applications by fusing it to DNA-binding domains, such as zinc fingers or catalytically inactive dCas9. These fusion proteins can direct CpG methylation to specific genomic loci, thereby enabling the study of site-specific methylation effects both in vivo and in vitro.
