= 5-Chlorouracil =

Names
- Preferred IUPAC name 5-Chloropyrimidine-2,4(1H,3H)-dione

Identifiers
| CAS Number | 1820-81-1 |
| 3D model (JSmol) | Interactive image |
| ChEBI | CHEBI:60762 |
| ChEMBL | ChEMBL144082 |
| ChemSpider | 14985 |
| ECHA InfoCard | 100.015.763 |
| EC Number | 217-339-7 |
| PubChem CID | 15758 |
| UNII | 7LQ4V03RNY |
| CompTox Dashboard (EPA) | DTXSID7075137 |
- InChI: InChI=1S/C4H3ClN2O2/c5-2-1-6-4(9)7-3(2)8/h1H,(H2,6,7,8,9) Key: ZFTBZKVVGZNMJR-UHFFFAOYSA-N
- SMILES: C1=C(C(=O)NC(=O)N1)Cl

Properties
| Chemical formula | C_{4}H_{3}ClN_{2}O_{2} |
| Molar mass | 146.53 g·mol^{−1} |
- Except where otherwise noted, data are given for materials in their standard state (at 25 °C [77 °F], 100 kPa). Infobox references

5-Chlorouracil is an organochlorine compound that is a chlorinated version of the nucleobase uracil. It is a marker for DNA damage caused by hypochlorous acid. In vivo, it is converted into mutagenic chlorodeoxyuridine.

== See also ==
- 5-Fluorouracil
- 5-Bromouracil
