= 5-Bromouridine =

Names
- IUPAC name 5-Bromouridine
- Systematic IUPAC name 1-[(2R,3R,4S,5R)-3,4-Dihydroxy-5-(hydroxymethyl)oxolan-2-yl]-5-bromoimidazole-2,4(1H,3H)-dione
- Other names 5-Bromouracil ribonucleoside; 1-β-Ribofuranosyl-5-bromo-uracil; 5-Bromouridin

Identifiers
CAS Number	957-75-5
3D model (JSmol)	Interactive image
Abbreviations	BrUrd
Beilstein Reference	33664
ChEBI	CHEBI:20553
ChemSpider	82616
ECHA InfoCard	100.012.260
EC Number	213-486-6
PubChem CID	91494
UNII	KEY8PG1BRC
CompTox Dashboard (EPA)	DTXSID401317210
- InChI: InChI=1S/C9H11BrN2O6/c10-3-1-12(9(17)11-7(3)16)8-6(15)5(14)4(2-13)18-8/h1,4-6,8,13-15H,2H2,(H,11,16,17)/t4-,5-,6-,8-/m1/s1 Key: AGFIRQJZCNVMCW-UAKXSSHOSA-N; InChI=1/C9H11BrN2O6/c10-3-1-12(9(17)11-7(3)16)8-6(15)5(14)4(2-13)18-8/h1,4-6,8,13-15H,2H2,(H,11,16,17)/t4-,5-,6-,8-/m1/s1 Key: AGFIRQJZCNVMCW-UAKXSSHOBS
- SMILES: BrC=1C(=O)NC(=O)N(C=1)[C@@H]2O[C@@H]([C@@H](O)[C@H]2O)CO

Properties
Chemical formula	C_{9}H_{11}BrN_{2}O_{6}
Molar mass	323.099 g·mol^{−1}
Appearance	Crystalline, white solid
Density	2.043 g/cm^{3}
Melting point	180 to 182 °C (356 to 360 °F; 453 to 455 K) (decomposes)
Chiral rotation ([α]_{D})	[α]22/D −11°, c = 2 in H_{2}O

Hazards
Autoignition temperature	Hazardous decomposition products formed under fire conditions. - Carbon oxides, nitrogen oxides (NOx), Hydrogen bromide gas
- Except where otherwise noted, data are given for materials in their standard state (at 25 °C [77 °F], 100 kPa). Infobox references

5-Bromouridine (abbreviated BrUrd, 5BrU, br5Urd or rarely the one letter code B) is a uridine derivative with a bromo substituent at the fifth carbon. BrUrd is incorporated into RNA and can be detected immunocytochemically and analysed by cytometry. It causes DNA damage through base substitution and increases the number of mutations.

== Uses ==
=== Detecting half-Life activity ===
5-Bromouridine has also been used to detect the half-life of RNA molecules. In a method called 5'-bromo-uridine immunoprecipitation chase-deep sequencing analysis (BRIC-seq), 5'-bromouridine is used to label RNA and enable the measurement of RNA levels over time. This method was used in Tani et al.'s study determining RNA half-lives to investigate the function of non-coding RNAs.

=== Splicing of pre-mRNA ===
5-Bromouridine was also used to study in vitro splicing of pre-mRNA in a study by Wansink. 5-Bromoruridine 5'-triphosphate (BruUTP) was used to label pre-mRNA and investigate the efficiency of splicing. They found that splicing is inhibited if uridines in RNA transcript were replaced by BrU, which suggested that Us were critical for the splicing reaction.

=== Detection of RNA synthesis in individual cells ===
Incorporation of 5-bromouridine by individual cells was detected immunocytochemically using antibodies against BrdU followed by flow cytometry.

== See also ==
- 5-Bromouracil
- Bromodeoxyuridine
