= 5-Bromouracil =

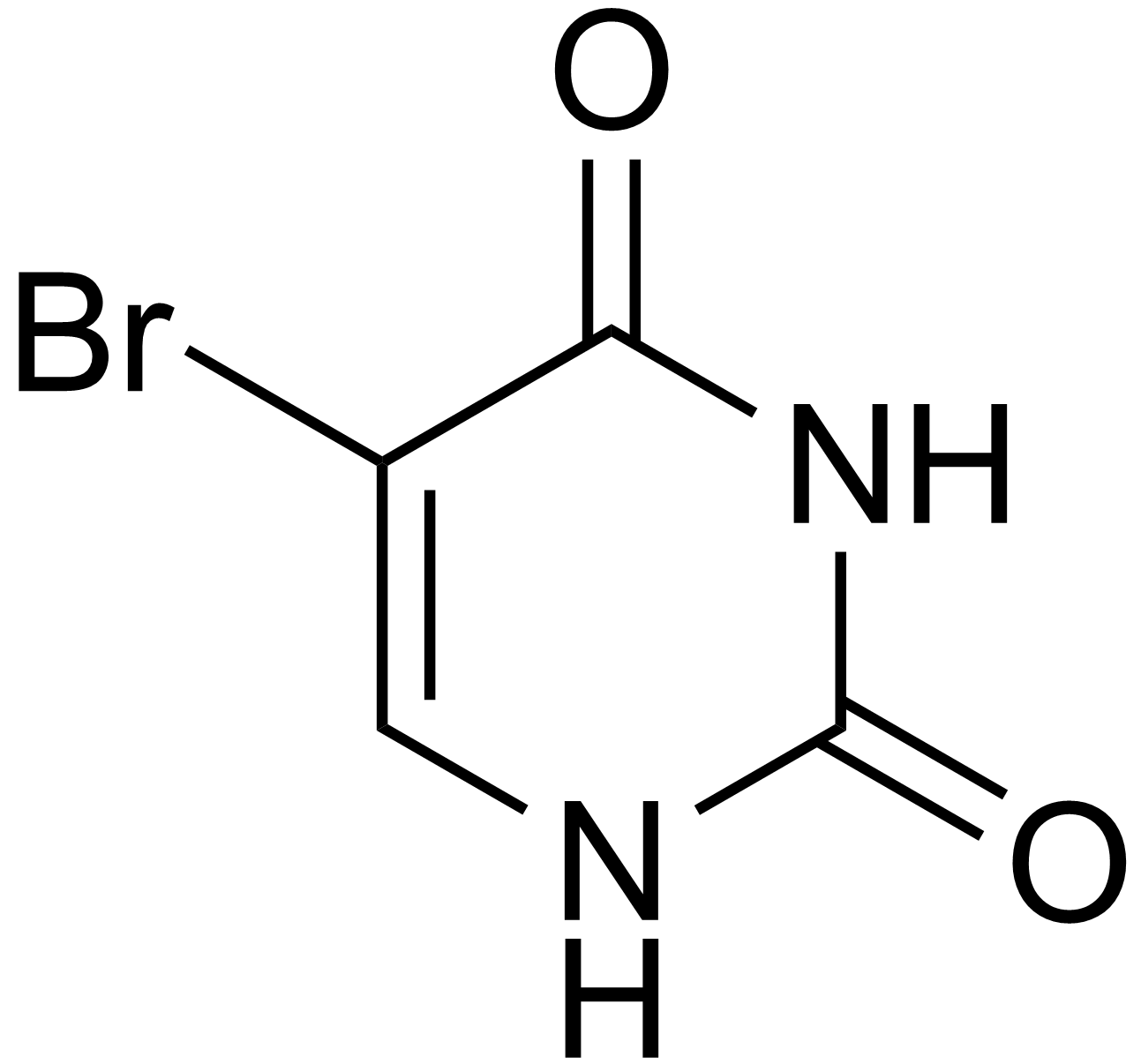

Names
- Preferred IUPAC name 5-Bromopyrimidine-2,4(1H,3H)-dione
- Other names 5-Bromo-2,4-dihydroxypyrimidine; 5-Bromopyrimidine-2,4-dione

Identifiers
CAS Number	51-20-7
3D model (JSmol)	Interactive image
Abbreviations	5-BrU br5Ura; 5BrUra
ChEBI	CHEBI:20552
ChEMBL	ChEMBL144730
ChemSpider	5597
ECHA InfoCard	100.000.077
PubChem CID	5802
UNII	4HK400G5UO
CompTox Dashboard (EPA)	DTXSID2058758
- InChI: InChI=1S/C4H3BrN2O2/c5-2-1-6-4(9)7-3(2)8/h1H,(H2,6,7,8,9) Key: LQLQRFGHAALLLE-UHFFFAOYSA-N; InChI=1/C4H3BrN2O2/c5-2-1-6-4(9)7-3(2)8/h1H,(H2,6,7,8,9) Key: LQLQRFGHAALLLE-UHFFFAOYAN
- SMILES: Br/C1=C/NC(=O)NC1=O

Properties
Chemical formula	C_{4}H_{3}BrN_{2}O_{2}
Molar mass	190.984 g·mol^{−1}
- Except where otherwise noted, data are given for materials in their standard state (at 25 °C [77 °F], 100 kPa). verify (what is ?) Infobox references

5-Bromouracil (5-BrU, 5BrUra, or br5Ura) is a brominated derivative of uracil that acts as an antimetabolite or base analog, substituting for thymine in DNA, and can induce DNA mutation in the same way as 2-aminopurine. It is used mainly as an experimental mutagen, but its deoxyriboside derivative (5-bromo-2-deoxy-uridine) is used to treat neoplasms.

5-BrU exists in three tautomeric forms that have different base pairing properties. The keto form (shown in the infobox) is complementary to adenine, so it can be incorporated into DNA by aligning opposite adenine residues during DNA replication (see below left). Alternatively, the enol (below right) and ion forms are complementary to guanine. This means that 5-BrU can be present in DNA either opposite adenine or guanine.

The three forms frequently interchange so base-pairing properties can become altered at any time. The result of this is that during a subsequent round of replication a different base is aligned opposite the 5-BrU residue. Further rounds of replication 'fix' the change by incorporating a normal nitrogen base into the complementary strand.

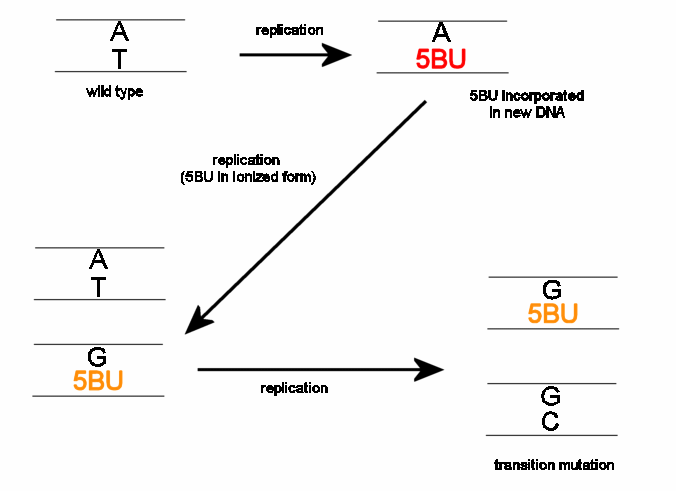
Mutagenesis by 5BU

Thus 5-BrU induces a point mutation via base substitution. This base pair will change from an A-T to a G-C or from a G-C to an A-T after a number of replication cycles, depending on whether 5-BrU is within the DNA molecule or is an incoming base when it is enolized or ionized.

== See also ==
- 5-Fluorouracil
- 5-Chlorouracil
