= Song control system =

A song system, also known as a song control system (SCS), is a series of discrete brain nuclei involved in song production and vocal learning in songbirds. It was first observed by Fernando Nottebohm in 1976 in a paper titled "Central control of song in the canary, Serinus canarius", published in the Journal of Comparative Neurology.

== Operation ==
Based on lesion studies in the zebra finch, the song system can be broken into two general pathways. The direct/descending motor pathway is both necessary and sufficient for normal song production, while the anterior forebrain pathway (AFP) is necessary for song learning but not production. Juvenile birds who have not yet fully learned their songs and that have lesions of the AFP never learn to make normal songs. Adult birds who experience these same lesions continue to sing normally for some time. The song system is sexually dimorphic in many species of songbirds, especially in species in which the male primarily sings.

== System model ==
The song system has emerged as leading model of adult neural plasticity. The song system is the first neural circuit in which it was conclusively demonstrated that newly generated neurons are incorporated into the brains of adults vertebrates. Some seasonally-breeding songbird brains vary in volume, neuron number, and density depending on the time of year, and these changes in the brain are driven by changes in circulating levels of testosterone.

== See also ==
- Bird vocalization
- Vocal learning
