= Fox Sports 3 =

Fox Sports 3 may refer to the following sports television channels:

- Fox Sports (Australia) (Fox Sports 3), a channel in Australia
- Fox Sports (Latin America) (Fox Sports 3), a channel available in Latin America
- Fox Sports Asia (Fox Sports 3), a channel in Asia, as a replacement for Fox Sports Plus HD

For the American channels, see Fox Sports 1 and Fox Sports 2.
