= 5-Ethynyl-2'-deoxyuridine =

5-Ethynyl-2′-deoxyuridine
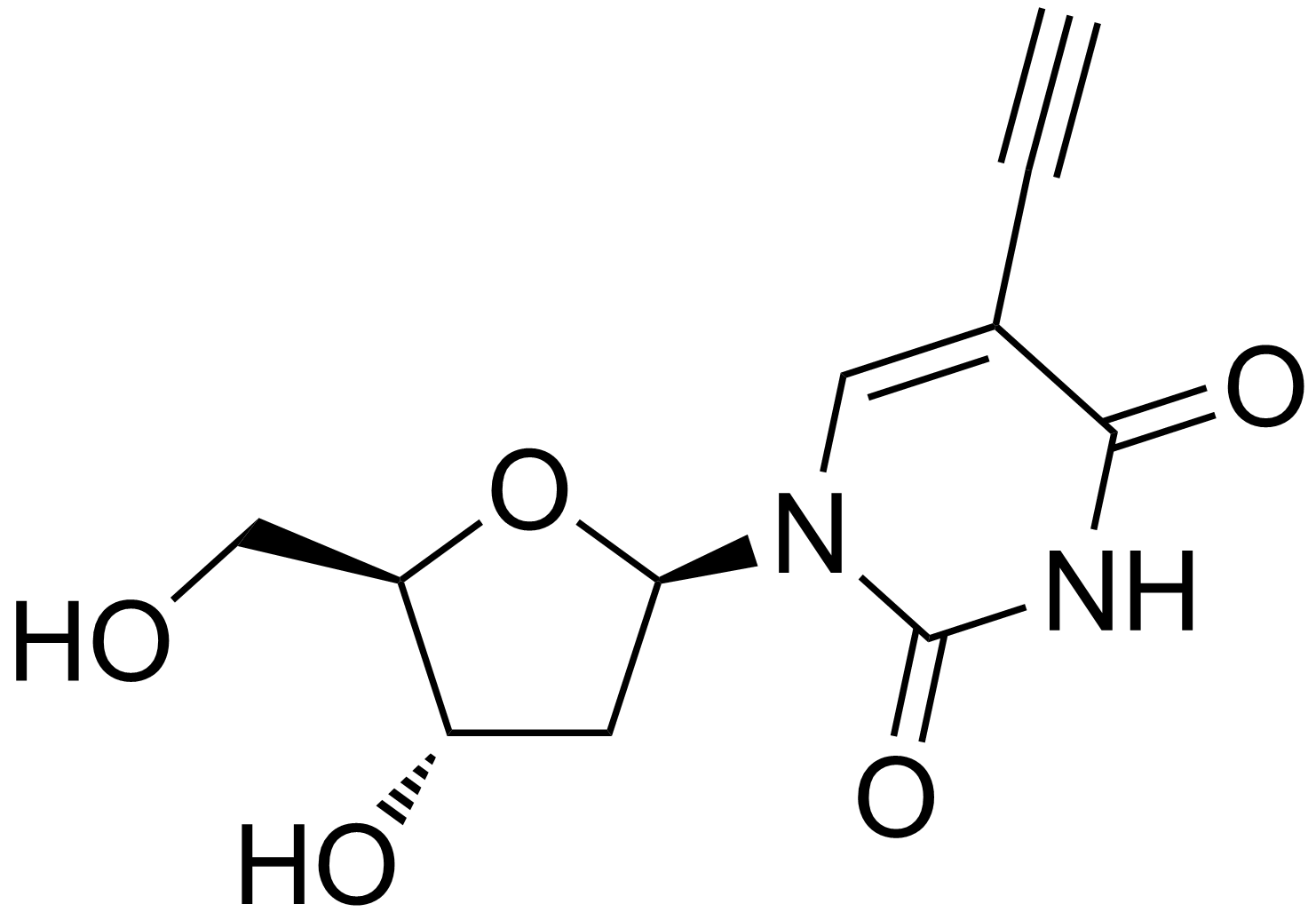

Names
- IUPAC name 2′-Deoxy-5-ethynyluridine
- Systematic IUPAC name 5-Ethynyl-1-[(2R,4S,5R)-4-hydroxy-5-(hydroxymethyl)oxolan-2-yl]pyrimidine-2,4(1H,3H)-dione
- Other names 5-Ethynyl-2′-deoxyuridine

Identifiers
CAS Number	61135-33-9
3D model (JSmol)	Interactive image
Abbreviations	EdU
ChEBI	CHEBI:232486
ChEMBL	ChEMBL222932
ChemSpider	414657
ECHA InfoCard	100.230.902
MeSH	5-ethynyl-2'-deoxyuridine
PubChem CID	472172
UNII	G373S00W2J
CompTox Dashboard (EPA)	DTXSID20976652
- InChI: InChI=1S/C11H12N2O5/c1-2-6-4-13(11(17)12-10(6)16)9-3-7(15)8(5-14)18-9/h1,4,7-9,14-15H,3,5H2,(H,12,16,17)/t7-,8+,9+/m0/s1 Key: CDEURGJCGCHYFH-DJLDLDEBSA-N
- SMILES: C#C\C1=C\N(C(=O)NC1=O)[C@H]2C[C@H](O)[C@@H](CO)O2

Properties
Chemical formula	C_{11}H_{12}N_{2}O_{5}
Molar mass	252.226 g·mol^{−1}
- Except where otherwise noted, data are given for materials in their standard state (at 25 °C [77 °F], 100 kPa). verify (what is ?) Infobox references

5-Ethynyl-2′-deoxyuridine (EdU) is a thymidine analogue which is incorporated into the DNA of dividing cells. EdU is used to assay DNA synthesis in cell culture and detect cells in embryonic, neonatal and adult animals which have undergone DNA synthesis. Whilst at high doses it can be cytotoxic, this molecule is now widely used to track proliferating cells in multiple biological systems.

EdU-labelling allows cells to be isolated without denaturing DNA, allowing researchers to determine the transcriptional profile of cells. This approach has been used to assess transcription in neuronal cells and tissues that have recently divided either in vitro or in vivo.

== Detection ==
EdU is labeled and detected with an azide molecule (most commonly fluorescent azides) through Cu(I)-catalyzed azide–alkyne cycloaddition (CuAAC) click chemistry. Unlike the commonly used bromodeoxyuridine (BrdU), EdU detection requires no heat or acid treatment.

== Toxicity ==
EdU incorporated into DNA induces DNA damage through the formation of interstrand crosslinks. These are detected by the cell during DNA replication, which is reflected by phosphorylation of histone H2AX, arrest in the cell cycle progression, and apoptosis.
