= Bromodeoxyuridine =

Compound commonly used to detect proliferating cells

Names
- IUPAC name 5-Bromo-2′-deoxyuridine
- Systematic IUPAC name 5-Bromo-1-[(2R,4S,5R)-4-hydroxy-5-(hydroxymethyl)oxolan-2-yl]pyrimidine-2,4(1H,3H)-dione

Identifiers
CAS Number	59-14-3
3D model (JSmol)	Interactive image
ChEMBL	ChEMBL222280
ChemSpider	5294121; 5813
ECHA InfoCard	100.000.378
MeSH	Bromodeoxyuridine
PubChem CID	6035
UNII	G34N38R2N1
CompTox Dashboard (EPA)	DTXSID7033105
- InChI: InChI=1S/C9H11BrN2O5/c10-4-2-12(9(16)11-8(4)15)7-1-5(14)6(3-13)17-7/h2,5-7,13-14H,1,3H2,(H,11,15,16)/t5-,6+,7+/m0/s1 Key: WOVKYSAHUYNSMH-RRKCRQDMSA-N; InChI=1/C9H11BrN2O5/c10-4-2-12(9(16)11-8(4)15)7-1-5(14)6(3-13)17-7/h2,5-7,13-14H,1,3H2,(H,11,15,16)/t5-,6+,7+/m0/s1 Key: WOVKYSAHUYNSMH-RRKCRQDMBM
- SMILES: c1c(c(=O)[nH]c(=O)n1[C@H]2C[C@@H]([C@H](O2)CO)O)Br

Properties
Chemical formula	C_{9}H_{11}BrN_{2}O_{5}
Molar mass	307.100 g·mol^{−1}
- Except where otherwise noted, data are given for materials in their standard state (at 25 °C [77 °F], 100 kPa). verify (what is ?) Infobox references

Bromodeoxyuridine (5-bromo-2'-deoxyuridine, BrdU, BUdR, BrdUrd, broxuridine) is a synthetic nucleoside analogue with a chemical structure similar to thymidine. BrdU is commonly used to study cell proliferation in living tissues and has been studied as a radiosensitizer and diagnostic tool in people with cancer.

During the S phase of the cell cycle (when DNA replication occurs), BrdU can be incorporated in place of thymidine in newly synthesized DNA molecules of dividing cells. Cells that have recently performed DNA replication or DNA repair can be detected with antibodies specific for BrdU using techniques such as immunohistochemistry or immunofluorescence. BrdU-labelled cells in humans can be detected up to two years after BrdU infusion.

Because BrdU can replace thymidine during DNA replication, it can cause mutations, and its use is therefore potentially a health hazard. However, because it is neither radioactive nor myelotoxic at labeling concentrations, it is widely preferred for in vivo studies of cancer cell proliferation. However, at radiosensitizing concentrations, BrdU becomes myelosuppressive, thus limiting its use for radiosensitizing.

BrdU differs from thymidine in that BrdU substitutes a bromine atom for thymidine's CH_{3} group. The Br substitution can be used in X-ray diffraction experiments in crystals containing either DNA or RNA. The Br atom acts as an anomalous scatterer and its larger size will affect the crystal's X-ray diffraction enough to detect isomorphous differences as well.

Bromodeoxyuridine releases gene silencing caused by DNA methylation.

BrdU can also be used to identify microorganisms that respond to specific carbon substrates in aquatic and soil environments. A carbon substrate added to the incubations of environmental samples will cause the growth of microorganisms that can utilize that substrate. These microorganisms will then incorporate BrdU into their DNA as they grow. Community DNA can then be isolated and BrdU-labeled DNA purified using an immunocapture technique. Subsequent sequencing of the labeled DNA can then be used to identify the microbial taxa that participated in the degradation of the added carbon source.

However, it is not certain whether all microbes present in an environmental sample can incorporate BrdU into their biomass during de novo DNA synthesis. Therefore, a group of microorganisms may respond to a carbon source but go undetected using this technique. Additionally, this technique is biased towards identifying microorganisms with A- and T-rich genomes.

DNA with BrdU transcribes as usual DNA, with guanine included in RNA as a complement to BrdU.

== See also ==
- 5-Bromouracil
- 5-Bromouridine
- 5-Ethynyl-2'-deoxyuridine
- Trypan blue
