= NeuN =

Antibody in molecular biology and neuroscience

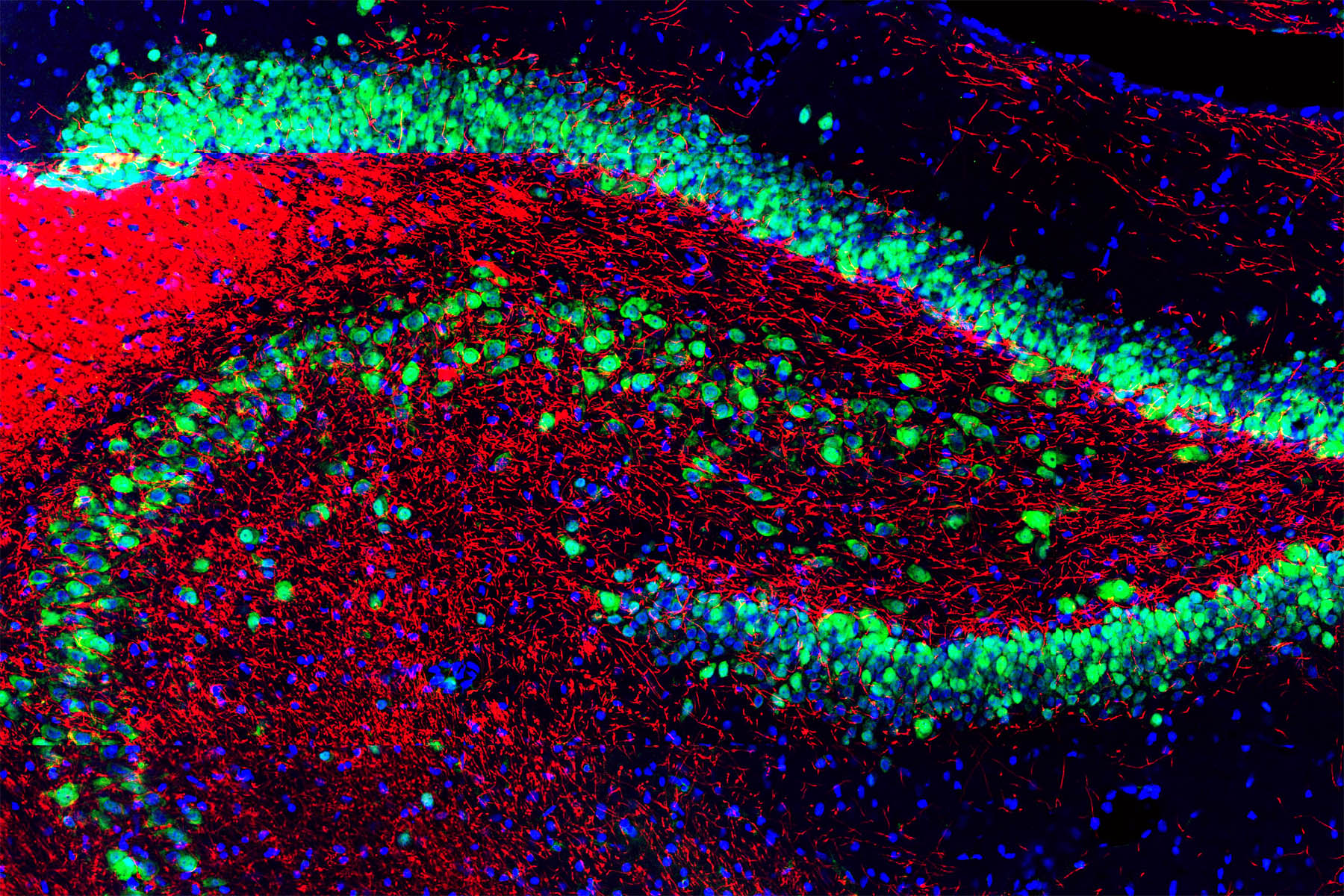
Rat hippocampus stained with antibody to NeuN/Fox-3 (green), myelin basic protein (red) and DNA (blue). Antibodies and image courtesy of EnCor Biotechnology Inc.

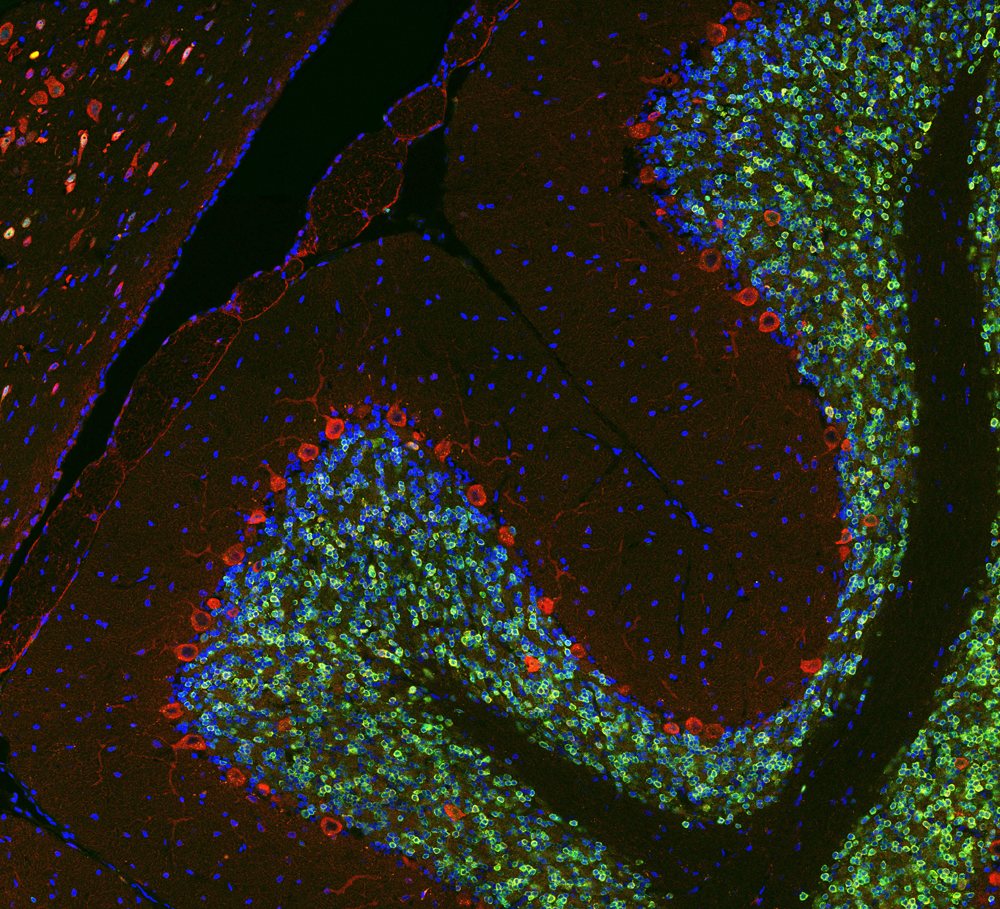
Antibody staining for NeuN/Fox-3 in the adult rat cerebellum in green. The NeuN/Fox-3 antibody binds to the small cerebellum granule cell neurons, which form a prominent layer. In contrast antibody to the close relative of NeuN/Fox-3, Fox-2, is shown in red. Fox-2 antibody stains Purkinje neurons and Golgi cell which are not recognized by the NeuN/Fox-3 antibody. The Purkinje cells form a layer above the much more abundant granule cells, and an occasional Golgi cell, also positive for Fox-2 but negative for NeuN/Fox-3, can be seen in the granule cell layer. DNA is shown in blue. Antibodies and image courtesy of EnCor Biotechnology Inc.

NeuN (Fox-3, Rbfox3, or Hexaribonucleotide Binding Protein-3), a protein which is a homologue to the protein product of a sex-determining gene in Caenorhabditis elegans, is a neuronal nuclear antigen that is commonly used as a biomarker for neurons.

== History ==
NeuN was first described in 1992 by Mullen et al., who raised a series of monoclonal antibodies to mouse antigens with the original intent of finding mouse species specific immunological markers for use in transplantation experiments. In the event they isolated a hybridoma line which produced a monoclonal antibody called mAb A60, which proved to bind an antigen expressed only in neuronal nuclei and to a lesser extent the cytoplasm of neuronal cells, and which appeared to work on all vertebrates. This antigen was therefore known as NeuN for "Neuronal Nuclei" though what the A60 antibody was binding to was unknown for the next 17 years. Eventually Kim et al. used proteomic methods to show that NeuN corresponds to a protein known as Fox-3, also known as Rbfox3, a mammalian homologue of Fox-1, a protein originally identified from genetic studies of sex determination in the nematode worm Caenorhabditis elegans, see below.

== Structure ==
Western blotting shows that mAb A60 binds to two bands of apparent molecular weight ~46kDa and ~48kDa on SDS-PAGE. These two bands are generated from a single Fox-3 gene by alternate splicing. There are in fact four protein products from the Fox-3 gene as a result of the presence or absence of two amino acid sequences coded by two exons. The inclusion or absence of 47 amino acids from exon 12 results in the ~46kDa and ~48kDa bands seen on SDS-PAGE gels, while the inclusion or absence of 14 amino acids from exon 15 produces two forms which are too similar in molecular size to be discerned on typical SDS-PAGE gels. Interestingly, the protein coded by exon 15 adds a C-terminal PY type nuclear localization sequence, which presumably explains why NeuN/Fox-3 protein can be both nuclear and, in some cell types, also cytoplasmic. All forms are expressed only in neurons so the mAb A60 antibody and other similar antibodies to NeuN/Fox-3 have become very widely used as robust markers of neurons.

== Uses as a Neuronal Biomarker ==
NeuN antibodies are widely used to label neurons, despite some shortcomings, and a June 2024 Pubmed search using the keyword "NeuN" produced over 5000 hits. A few neuronal cell types are not recognized by NeuN antibodies, such as Purkinje cells, stellate and Golgi cells of the cerebellum, olfactory Mitral cells, retinal photoreceptors and spinal cord gamma motor neurons. However the vast majority of neurons are strongly NeuN positive, and NeuN immunoreactivity has been widely used to identify neurons in tissue culture, in sections and to measure the neuron/glia ratio in brain regions. NeuN immunoreactivity becomes obvious as neurons mature, typically after they have downregulated expression of Doublecortin, a marker seen in the earliest stages of neuronal development.

== Feminizing Locus on X Homologue ==
Fox-3 is one of a family of three mammalian homologues of the Fox-1 protein, originally discovered as the protein product of a gene involved in sex determination in the nematode worm C. elegans. "Fox" is an acronym of "Feminizing locus on X". The mammalian genome contains three genes homologous to C. elegans Fox-1 (a.k.a. RBFOX1, A2BP, A2BP1 and HRNBP1), Fox-2, (a.k.a. RBFOX2, RBM9, RTA and HRNBP2) and Fox-3 (a.k.a. RBFOX3 and HRNBP3). The HGNC names for the three proteins are RBFOX1, RBFOX2 and RBFOX3 respectively. The Fox proteins are each about 46kDa in size, and each includes a central, highly conserved ~70 amino acid RRM or RNA recognition motif. RRM domains are one of the most common in the human genome and are found in numerous proteins which bind RNA. The three mammalian Fox proteins function in the regulation of mRNA splicing and bind specific RNA sequences. An alternate name the three proteins is hexaribonucleotide binding protein 1, 2 and 3, (HRNBP1, 2 and 3), since all three bind the hexaribonucleotide UGCAUG, this binding being involved in their regulation of mRNA splicing.
