= RBFOX2 =

Protein-coding gene in humans

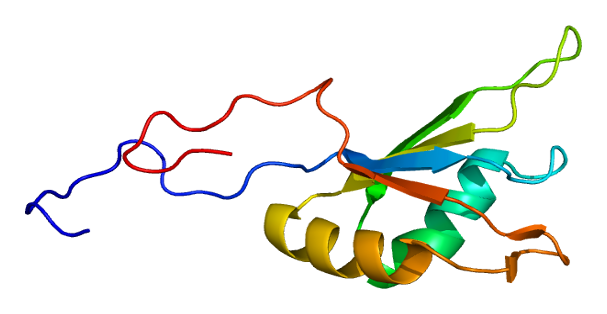

Identifiers
- Aliases: RBFOX2, FOX2, Fox-2, HNRBP2, HRNBP2, RBM9, RTA, dJ106I20.3, fxh, RNA binding protein, fox-1 homolog 2, RNA binding fox-1 homolog 2
- External IDs: OMIM: 612149; MGI: 1933973; GeneCards: RBFOX2
Available structures
PDB	Ortholog search: PDBe RCSB
PDB	List of PDB id codes 2CQ3

Gene location (Human)
Chr.	Chromosome 22 (human)
Band	22q12.3	Start	35,738,736 bp
Band	22q12.3	End	36,028,824 bp

Gene location (Mouse)
Chr.	Chromosome 15 (mouse)
Band	15|15 D3	Start	77,078,990 bp
Band	15|15 D3	End	77,307,004 bp
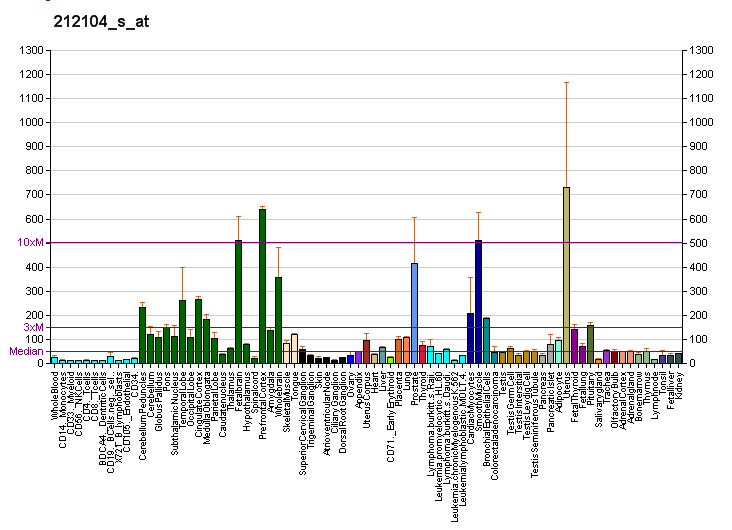

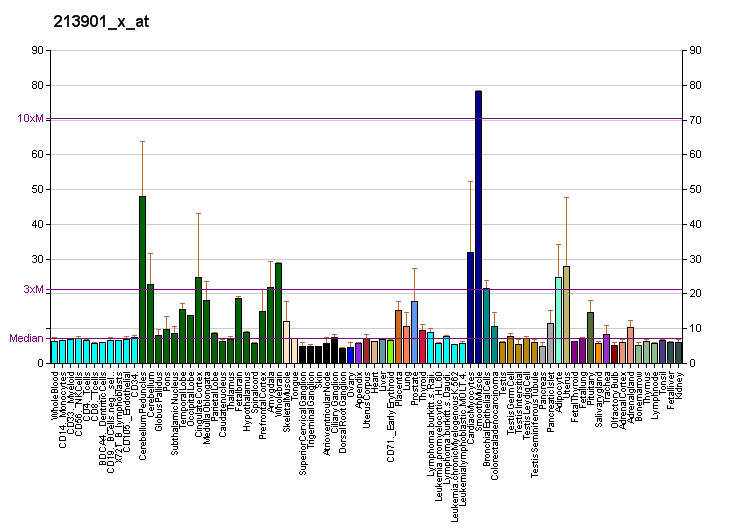
RNA expression pattern
Bgee	Human / Mouse (ortholog); Top expressed in: ganglionic eminence; cerebellar cortex; cerebellar hemisphere; right hemisphere of cerebellum; smooth muscle tissue; stromal cell of endometrium; superior frontal gyrus; Achilles tendon; body of uterus; muscle of thigh / Top expressed in: genital tubercle; lateral septal nucleus; ventromedial nucleus; ganglionic eminence; tail of embryo; superior frontal gyrus; mammillary body; dentate gyrus of hippocampal formation granule cell; lateral geniculate nucleus; cerebellar cortex; More reference expression data
BioGPS	More reference expression data
Gene ontology
Molecular function	transcription corepressor activity; transcription factor binding; protein binding; RNA binding; nucleic acid binding; mRNA binding
Cellular component	nucleus; nucleoplasm; cytoplasm; cytosol
Biological process	neuromuscular process controlling balance; dendrite morphogenesis; mRNA processing; regulation of alternative mRNA splicing, via spliceosome; nervous system development; regulation of RNA splicing; regulation of cell population proliferation; RNA splicing; radial glia guided migration of Purkinje cell; regulation of definitive erythrocyte differentiation; RNA metabolic process; negative regulation of transcription, DNA-templated; intracellular estrogen receptor signaling pathway; fibroblast growth factor receptor signaling pathway
Sources:Amigo / QuickGO
Orthologs
Databases	NCBI: entry; OMA: entry
Species	Human	Mouse
Entrez	23543	93686
Ensembl	ENSG00000277564; ENSG00000100320	ENSMUSG00000033565
UniProt	O43251	Q8BP71
RefSeq (mRNA)	NM_001031695; NM_001082576; NM_001082577; NM_001082578; NM_001082579 NM_014309; NM_001349982; NM_001349983; NM_001349989; NM_001349990; NM_001349991; NM_001349992; NM_001349994; NM_001349995; NM_001349996; NM_001349997; NM_001349998; NM_001349999; NM_001394108; NM_001394109; NM_001394110; NM_001394111; NM_001394112; NM_001394113; NM_001394114; NM_001394115	NM_001110827; NM_001110828; NM_001110829; NM_001110830; NM_001286417 NM_001286418; NM_001286419; NM_053104; NM_175387; NM_001358770; NM_001358771; NM_001358772
RefSeq (protein)	NP_001026865; NP_001076045; NP_001076046; NP_001076047; NP_001076048 NP_055124; NP_001336911; NP_001336912; NP_001336918; NP_001336919; NP_001336920; NP_001336921; NP_001336923; NP_001336924; NP_001336925; NP_001336926; NP_001336927; NP_001336928	NP_001104297; NP_001104298; NP_001104299; NP_001104300; NP_001273346 NP_001273347; NP_001273348; NP_444334; NP_780596; NP_001345699; NP_001345700; NP_001345701
Location (UCSC)	Chr 22: 35.74 – 36.03 Mb	Chr 15: 77.08 – 77.31 Mb
PubMed search
- Wikidata
View/Edit Human	View/Edit Mouse

RNA binding protein fox-1 homolog 2 (RBFOX2), is a protein which in humans is encoded by the RBFOX2 gene (previously RBM9).

== Function ==
Rbfox2 is one of several human genes similar to the C. elegans gene Fox-1. This gene encodes an RNA binding protein that is thought to be a key regulator of alternative splicing in the nervous system and other cell types. Rbfox2 and the related protein Rbfox1 bind to conserved (U)GCAUG RNA motifs in the introns adjacent to many alternatively spliced exons and promotes inclusion or exclusion of the alternative exon in mature transcripts. The protein also interacts with the estrogen receptor 1 transcription factor and regulates estrogen receptor 1 transcriptional activity. Multiple transcript variants encoding different isoforms have been found for this gene.

Rbfox2, as determined by CLIP-seq, binds near alternatively spliced exons and regulates the inclusion or exclusion of exons during alternative splicing by binding in introns either downstream (inclusion) or upstream (exon skipping) of exons. Its presence is important for stem cell survival and knockdowns of Rbfox2 activate markers for apoptosis.

== See also ==
- Alternative splicing
- RNA-binding protein
