= 2-Aminopurine =

- 2-Aminopurine

Names
- Preferred IUPAC name 9H-Purin-2-amine

Identifiers
| CAS Number | 452-06-2 |
| 3D model (JSmol) | Interactive image |
| ChEBI | CHEBI:479072 |
| ChEMBL | ChEMBL388594 |
| ChemSpider | 9561 |
| ECHA InfoCard | 100.006.545 |
| PubChem CID | 9955 |
| UNII | O14B3U97FW |
| CompTox Dashboard (EPA) | DTXSID40196416 |
- InChI: InChI=1S/C5H5N5/c6-5-7-1-3-4(10-5)9-2-8-3/h1-2H,(H3,6,7,8,9,10) Key: MWBWWFOAEOYUST-UHFFFAOYSA-N; InChI=1/C5H5N5/c6-5-7-1-3-4(10-5)9-2-8-3/h1-2H,(H3,6,7,8,9,10) Key: MWBWWFOAEOYUST-UHFFFAOYAC
- SMILES: Nc2ncc1nc[nH]c1n2

Properties
| Chemical formula | C_{5}H_{5}N_{5} |
| Molar mass | 135.130 g·mol^{−1} |
- Except where otherwise noted, data are given for materials in their standard state (at 25 °C [77 °F], 100 kPa). verify (what is ?) Infobox references

2-Aminopurine (2AP), a purine analog of guanine and adenine, is a fluorescent molecular marker used in nucleic acid research. It most commonly pairs with thymine as an adenine-analogue. It uses a different ketone oxygen on thymine for H-bonding and forms a stronger bond.

It can also pair with cytosine at low pH in a protonated way like a functional analogue of guanine. For this reason it is sometimes used in the laboratory for mutagenesis. A mixture of structures are present according to NMR. An atomic-resolution structures of the 2AP·C pair has been produced.

== See also ==
- Nucleic acid analogues
