= Proneural genes =

Proneural genes encode transcription factors of the basic helix-loop-helix (bHLH) class which are responsible for the development of neuroectodermal progenitor cells. Proneural genes have multiple functions in neural development. They integrate positional information and contribute to the specification of progenitor-cell identity. From the same ectodermal cell types, neural or epidermal cells can develop based on interactions between proneural and neurogenic genes. Neurogenic genes are so called because loss of function mutants show an increased number of developed neural precursors. On the other hand, proneural genes mutants fail to develop neural precursor cells.

The proneural genes are expressed in groups of cells (proneural clusters) from which one progenitor cell – typically the one in the middle – will be singled out, leading to the formation of many different types of neurons in the central and peripheral nervous systems. Proneural genes encode a group of bHLH proteins that play crucial roles in controlling cell fate in a variety of tissue types. Basic helix-loop-helix proteins are characterized by two alpha helixes separated by a loop. The helixes mediate dimerization, and the adjacent basic region is required for DNA binding. The human genome contains approximately 125 bHLH factors.

== Discovery ==
The proneural genes were first identified in the 1920s, when mutant flies that lacked subsets of external sense organs or bristles were found. Later on, in the 1970s, the achaete-scute complex, a complex of genes that are involved in regulating the early steps of neural development in Drosophila, were identified. Using molecular tools it was possible to isolate the first four genes of this complex: achaete (ac), scute (sc), lethal of scute (lsc) and asense (ase). Another proneural gene, atonal (ato) was isolated more recently and two ato-related genes, amos and cato, were later-isolated, defining a second family of proneural genes – atonal complex. Recently, the first homologue of the fly proneural genes to be found in mammals was mash1.

== List of proneural genes ==
This list refers to bHLH proteins found in invertebrates and vertebrates. They are grouped in distinct families on the basis of closer sequence similarities in the bHLH domain:

Organisms	E-proteins	atonal family	nato family	oligo family	neuroD family	Neurogenin family	achate-scute family	Nscl family
invertebrates	Daughterless	Atonal, Amos, Cato, Lin32	Nato3			Biparous	CnASH, Achaete (ac), Asense (ase), Scute (sc), Lethal of scute (lsc)	
vertebrates	E-12	Math1, Math5	Nato3	Beta3, Beta4, Olig1, Olig2, Olig3	NeuroD1 (NeuroD), NeuroD2 (Ndrf), NeuroD4 (Math3), NeuroD6 (Math2, Nex1)	amphioxNgn, Ngn1, Ngn2, Ngn3	Cash4, Mash1, Mash2, Xash3	Nscl1, Nscl2

== Proneural genes functions ==
Genes of the ASC and Neurogenin families, and possibly members of the family of ato homologues, have a similar proneural function in vertebrates to that of their Drosophila counterparts, whereas other neural bHLH genes are involved in specifying neuronal fates or in neuronal differentiation, but have no proneural role.

=== Neural functions ===
Proneural proteins bind DNA as heterodimeric complexes that are formed by bHLH proteins or E proteins. Because heterodimerization is a prerequisite for DNA binding, factors that interfere with dimerization effectively act as passive repressors of proneural gene activity. Proneural proteins specifically bind DNA sequences that contain a core hexanucleotide motif, CANNTG, known as an E-box. The basic region and helix 1 of the bHLH domain form a long alpha-helix that is connected with the loop region to helix 2. Direct contacts between bHLH residues and DNA are responsible for the common ability of neural bHLH proteins to bind to the core E-boxsequence. The cells within a cluster that express a proneural gene (called a proneural cluster) can be thought of as cells of an equivalence group. Within a proneural cluster, the cells compete with each other, such that only a subset of cells is singled out to develop into neuronal precursors. This singling out process is mediated by cell-cell interactions interpreted through the action of neurogenic genes. In neuroectoderm, neurogenic genes are required to single out cells from within proneural clusters to form neuronal precursors, leaving the remaining cells of proneural clusters to develop into epidermal cells. Proneural genes may function in analogous fashions in vertebrates and invertebrates, specifically they were implicated in early neurogenesis. Although proneural proteins are responsible for trigger neurogenesis, different proteins are required for different neural and/or glial cell types. This implies that each of these proteins is capable of regulating both common target genes for neurogenesis and unique target genes for neuronal subtype characteristics. Proneural bHLH transcription factors, not only drive neurogenesis by activating the expression of a cascade of neuronal genes, but they inhibit the expression of glial genes. Neural bHLH genes have different functions depending on: the sensitivity to lateral inhibition, which determines if a cell becomes epidermal or neuronal, and whether the gene is expressed in the CNS before or after the terminal mitosis.

Proneural genes promote neurogenesis and inhibit gliogenesis but some neurogenic factors can regulate both of these processes, depending on the proneural genes concentration. For example, BMPs (Bone Morphogenetic Proteins) promote neurogenesis in progenitors that express high levels of Neurogenin-1 and gliogenesis in progenitors that express low levels of Neurogenin-1. Gliogenesis processes depend on low concentrations or delection of proneural genes and can be accelerated depending on which proneural genes are affected.

==== In invertebrates ====
In Drosophila, proneural genes are first expressed in quiescent ectodermal cells that have both epidermal and neuronal potential. Proneural activity results in the selection of progenitors that are committed to a neural fate but remain multipotent, with sense organ progenitors giving rise to neurons, glia and other non-neuronal cell types. Additionally, some neuroblasts of the central nervous system also generate both neurons and glia. Progenitors of the peripheral and central nervous system only begin to divide after proneural gene expression has subsided.

==== In vertebrates ====
Proneural genes are first expressed in neuroepithelial cells that are already specified for a neural fate and are self-renewing. Proneural activity results in the generation and delamination of progenitors that are restricted to the neuronal fate and have a limited mitotic potential. In some lineages, at least, proneural genes are involved in the commitment of neural progenitors to the neuronal fate at the expense of a glial fate.

==== In lateral inhibition process ====
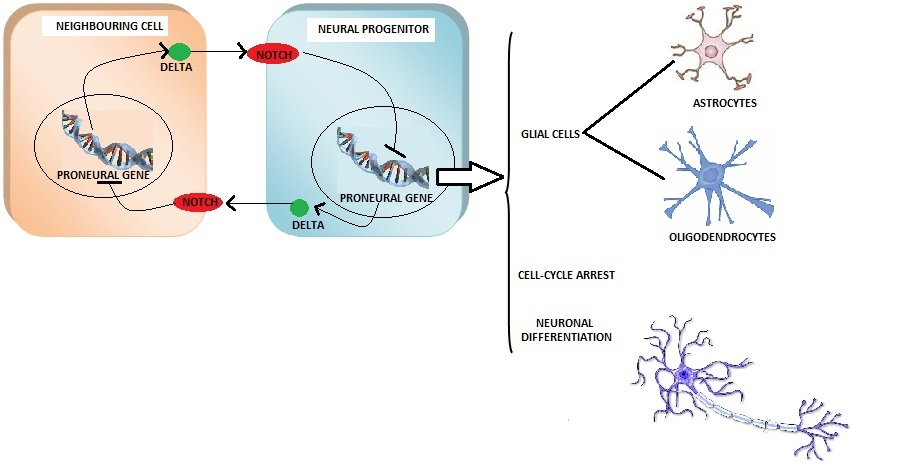
Lateral inhibition process -The expression of proneural genes in a neural progenitor leads to gliogenesis, neurogenesis and cell-cycle arrest. Besides this, it also promotes the expression of Delta that binds to the Notch receptor of a neighbour cell, repressing the proneural genes. In this way, it is generated a salt-and-pepper pattern of expression, with a central neural cell, surrounded by epidermal cells.

Lateral inhibition is a cell-cell interaction that occurs within a proneural cluster to determine and limit the cells that give rise to neuroblast. During this interaction, nascent neuroblasts express proneural genes above a determined threshold and, at the same time, they express a membrane bound ligand, called Delta, which binds and activate Notch receptors expressed in neighboring cells. Once Notch is activated, the activity of proneural genes decreases in these cells, probably due to the activation of genes in the enhancer of split E(spl) complex, encoding in inhibitory bHLH transcription factors. When inhibited, proneural genes prevent cells from becoming neural, but also reduce their levels of Delta. These particular interactions restrict the proneural activity to a single cell in each proneural cluster giving rise to a salt-and-pepper pattern.

Not all proneural genes are equally sensitive to lateral inhibition. For example, in Xenopus, Chitnis and Kintner demonstrated that XASH-3 and NeuroD (achaete-scute complex) respond differently to lateral inhibition, which reflect different ability to activate target genes and differential susceptibility of these target genes to repression by notch. Posterior studies revealed that even when Notch/Delta signaling pathway is blocked, Wnt2b is capable of inhibiting neuronal differentiation, through the downregulation of mRNA expression of multiple proneural genes and also of Notch1. With this mechanism Wnt2b maintains progenitor cells undifferentiated by attenuating the expression of proneural and neurogenic genes, preventing cells from getting into the differentiation cascade regulated by proneural genes and Notch. Although notch signaling is involved in the control of proneural gene expression, positive-feedback loops are required to increase or maintain the levels of proneural genes. The transcription factors responsible for this maintenance can act through the inhibition of the notch signaling pathway in particular cells or at a post-transcriptional level, affecting proneural genes transcription and function.

==== In neurogenesis ====
===== Neurogenesis in the invertebrate nervous system =====
In invertebrates, the proneural genes, particularly the members of the achaete-scute complex (AS-C) promote neurogenesis, while the neurogenic genes prevent neurogenesis and facilitate epidermal development. The formation of neuroblasts depends on the Achaete-scute complex genes – achaete (ac), scute (sc), lethal of scute (lsc) and ventral nervous system defective (vnd). However, only vnd can control this formation process because this gene activates the expression of the others. ac, sc, lsc factors are initially expressed within the primordium of the embryonic central nervous system (neuroectoderm) in proneural clusters, from which single neuroblasts later arise. Every cell of the proneural cluster shares a common neuroblasts-forming potential. The local inhibition of the remaining cells by the enlarging neuroblasts ensures that only one neuroblast arises from the proneural cluster. All cells of the cluster retain their NB forming potential, at least while the NB is enlarging, but lose this potential by the time the cell is about to divide. The patterns of expression of the proneural genes lead to different modes of neuroblasts formation in the head and trunk. Co-expression of proneural genes in brain neuroblasts is transient and varies with the developmental stage.

===== Neurogenesis of the stomatogastric nervous system in Drosophila =====
Proneural gene expression in the neuroectodermal cells that constitutes the proneural clusters turns them competent to delaminate as neuroblasts. Although neuroblasts are the precursors of Drosophila's central nervous system (CNS), the proneural gene expression are also involved in control specification and morphogenesis of stomatogastric nerve cell precursors. These genes are expressed and required during all phases of the stomatogastric nervous system (SNS) development to regulate the number, pattern and structural characteristics of the SNS subpopulations. The proper balance between proneural and neurogenic gene expression in the SNS placodes is involved in the control of a complex sequence of morphogenetic movements (delamination, invagination and dissociation) by which these placodes give rise to the different SNS subpopulations.

===== Neurogenesis in the vertebrate central nervous system =====
In central nervous system not all bHLH genes are involved in neurogenesis because NeuroD and Math3/NeuroM families are also involved in the neuronal-versus-glial cell fate decision. Another pro-neural family (which includes math1 and math5) is essential to the development of a small number of neural lineages whereas math1 have also a role in the specification interneuron identity. Cell types that depend on math1 expression belong to the proprioceptive sensory pathway. Bertrand et al. (2002) have confirmed the proneural activity of mash1, ngn1 and ngn2, and possibly math1 and math5 in the mouse. Neurogenesis in the central nervous system depends on proneural gene inhibition by Notch signaling pathway and the absence of this key regulator results in the premature differentiation of neurons. To maintain neural progenitor cells a regulatory loop takes place between neighboring cells, that involves the lateral inhibition process (see lateral inhibition). In the absence of Lateral inhibition some proneural genes such as ASCL1 or "neuroG" are capable of inducing the expression of neuron-specific genes leading to the premature formation of early born-neurons. Ratié and colleagues (2013) comprised that Notch proneural gene network have an important role in cell fate renewal and transition in the mouse.

===== Neurogenesis in the vertebrate peripheral nervous system =====
In the peripheral nervous system, Ngns are involved in the determination of all cranial and spinal sensory progenitors. Proneural genes such as mash1, ngn1 and ngn2 are mainly expressed in most progenitors of spinal cord, and are also co-express in the dorsal telencephalon. Together these groups of bHLH factors promote the generation of all cerebral cortex progenitors. Mash1 is the only gene expressed in the ventral telencephalon. However, in the ventral and dorsal ends of the neural tube a different type of proneural genes is expressed, such as ngn3 and math1.

==== In gliogenesis ====
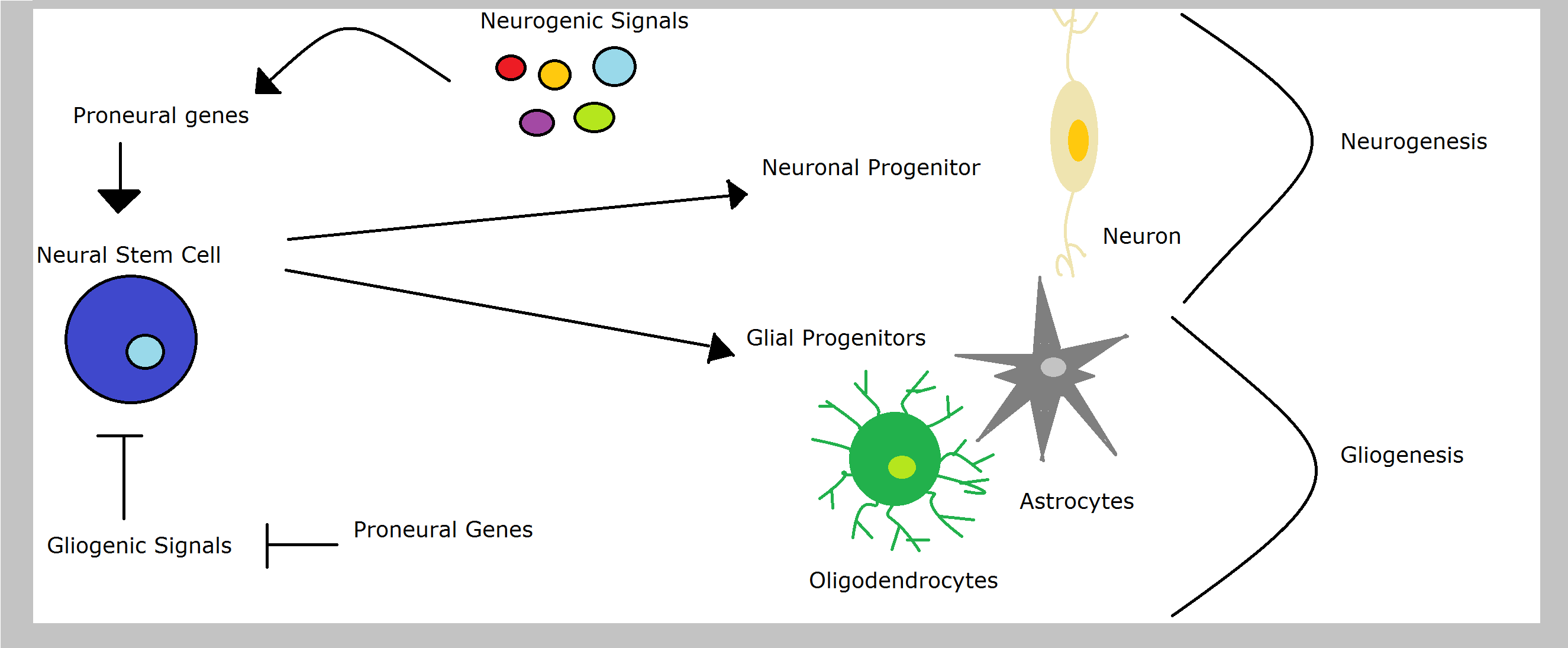
Proneural genes in neurogenesis and gliogenesis pathway - Neural stem cells have the potential to generate all neural cell types, such as neuron (neuronal progenitor), astrocytes and oligodendrocytes (glial progenitors). The proneural gene expression is induced by neurogenic signals and results in the activation of neuronal-differentiation pathway . At the same time, glial differentiation is inhibited. Neural stem cells lead to neuron differentiation while proneural genes inhibit glyogenic signals and consequently the glial-differentiation pathway.

Neural stem cells could give rise to neuronal or glial progenitors, depending on the type of signals that they receive - gliogenic or neurogenic signals, respectively. Glial progenitor cells could differentiate into oligodendrocytes or astrocytes. However, lineage commitment of neural progenitors involves the suppression of alternative fates. Therefore, vertebrate proneural genes promote neuronal fates and simultaneously inhibit glial fates. For example, the downregulation of the expression of proneural gene ngn2 in the spinal cord represses oligodendrocyte differentiation. In the context of restricted glial progenitors, proneural genes might have functions that are distinct from their better-characterized role in lineage specification, perhaps in the differentiation of glial lineages. Sun and colleagues showed that proneural ngn1 inhibits gliogenesis by binding transcriptional co-activators like CBP/Smad1 or p300/Smad1 preventing the transcription of glialdifferentiation genes. On the other hand, the Notch signaling pathway is capable of promoting gliogenesis in stem cells through the inhibition of proneural genes, such as mash1 and neurogenins.

==== In cell-cycle regulation fate ====
In vertebrates, although proneural genes determine the neural fate of progenitors, they also promote the arrest of their division stage by the isolation of already specified progenitor cells from the influence of extrinsic fate-determining cues. Proneural genes regulate cell cycle by the activation of cyclin-dependent kinase (Cdk) inhibitors in some lineages at the level of neuronal-differentiation genes. On the other hand, in invertebrates like Drosophila, proneural genes are expressed mainly in non-dividing cells, but could also be expressed in dividing-cells, where Achaete-scute complex proneural genes have been shown to inhibit cell-cycle progression.

==== In the development of sensory organs ====
The proneural genes also have an important role in the development of distinct types of sensory organs, namely chordotonal organs (proprioceptorsthat detect mechanical and sound vibrations) and external sensory organs. Members of achaete-scute complex, such as achaete and scute, as well as atonal and daughterless confer to ectodermal cells the ability to become sensory mother cells (SMCs). In the development of sensory organs there are two main phases: determination and differentiation that may not be mechanistically separable. Proneural proteins are involved in both processes, through the activation of the downstream "differentiating genes" that in turn regulate the induction of sensory-organ-subtype characteristics. The specification of sensory organs by proneural genes is a complex process, since they elicit different cellular contexts. For instance, in Drosophila, atonal (ato) can promote the development of chordotonal organs, for the receptors of olfactory sense organs, depending on the imaginal disc in which it is expressed. In Drosophila's embryogenesis, the proneural gene achaete is expressed in well-determined regions as in the endoderm, being responsible for the formation of particular sensory organs in the adult and larvae. According to Ruíz-Gomes and Ghysen (1993), this expression occurs in two distinct phases: a competent state, in which the proneural gene is expressed in a cell cluster; a determined state, in which a specific cell accumulate high levels of ac transcripts, originating a neural precursor. The function of each of the ASC complex genes varies with the development state (larvae or adult). For example, in the adult state the ac and sc genes promote the differentiation of two sets of complementary sensory organs and ase gene as a minimal function, while in the larvae state ac and sc genes affect the same set of sensory organs and ase is responsible for the determination of a complementary set.

==== In corticogenesis ====
In the neocortex exists a wide neuronal network, supported by astrocytes and oligodendrocytes (glial cells) with different functions. During cortical development, bHLH factors control proliferation and differentiation of neural cells and their functions at any given time and place depends on their cellular context. NeuroD, Ngns, Mash, Olig and other proneural gene families have a crucial role in cell fate decision during corticogenesis and different combinations of them regulate the choice and the timing of differentiation into a neuron, an astrocyte or an oligodendrocyte. High levels of Ngn1 and Ngn2 are required to specify neuronal identity of cortical progenitors only in early stages of neocortex development. Particularly, ngn2 is also important to regulate the transition of cortical progenitors from the ventricular zone to the subventricular zone. On the other hand, mash1 is implicated in the early differentiation of striatum neurons and sufficient to promote basal cell divisions independently of its role in the specification of neuronal cell fates at later stages. Cooperation between ngn2 and mash1 proneural genes regulate the transition of cortical progenitors from apical to basal cell compartments. The specification of different neuronal subtypes depends on the group of proneural genes involved. Low levels of proneural transcripts in ventricular zone are expressed when progenitor's specification occurs and an increase in their expression results in the beginning of neurogenesis. Ngns are responsible for the formation of glutamatergic neurons whereas mash1 gives rise to GABAergic and cholinergic neurons.

==== In Drosophila photoreceptor development ====
The proneural protein Atonal (Ato) is responsible for the development of Drosophila's R8 photoreceptors. However, it does not act alone, since it dimerizes with a second identical protein, Daughterless (Da) that reinforces its expression. The coexpression of Ato and Da is important for the migration of the different cell types of an ommatidium and for the repression of atonal in the inter-cluster spaces, functioning as inhibitory signals that regulate both the number and position of the nascent R8 cells. Moreover, this expression leads to the activation of the kinase MAPK that is important for the cellular recruitment and the repressor effect, once, when this kinase is inactive the expression of Ato is detected in every cell. In an initial state, Hedgehog (Hh) and Decapentaplegic are responsible for the activation of ato in small cellular clusters, leading to the activation of MAPK. First, Hedgehog induces ato expression in more than just the cells that ultimately become photoreceptor cells, so its expression has to be refined and restricted to a single presumptive R8 cell. Hedgehog signaling is also required to repress atonal expression between the nascent proneural clusters, which reveals a dual role crucial to building precision and geometry into the adult retina. Therefore, the regulation of ato expression depends on the levels of Hedgehog: at low levels (that is far from the source) this pronuclear gene is activated and at high levels (close to the source) it is repressed. Combining lateral inhibition with the dual role played by Hedgehog, one can imagine how the hexagonal array of R8 cells can be patterned.

=== Non-neural functions ===
Besides their role in the nervous system development, proneural genes are also involved in processes related to trophoblast invasion, endocrine cell differentiation (namely in pancreas and adenohypophysis), sex determination and lungs, thyroid, adrenal and salivary glands and gastrointestinal system development.

==== In human trophoblast invasion ====
Additionally to their involvement in neuronal and glial differentiation, sex determination and sensory organs development, proneural genes are also involved in trophoblast differentiation during progression of invasion, in placental formation. Studies revealed the expression of neuroD1, neuroD2 and ath2 transcripts in different subsets of invasive trophoblast.

==== In pancreas development ====
In the developing pancreas, transcription factor ngn3'marks the populations of cells that are in transit from undifferentiated epithelial progenitor cells to mature endocrine cells (precursors of pancreatic endocrine cells), and thus that do not express hormones yet, which suggests that this gene is turned off in differentiated hormone-positive. ngn3 is both necessary and sufficient to drive the formation of islet cells during pancreatic development, in a manner similar to the specification of neural fate in neuroectoderm.

==== In sex determination ====
Although neurogenesis and sex determination appear to be different biological processes, there is evidence that daughterless (da) - an essential gene for the formation of the entire Drosophila peripheral nervous system - is also required for proper sex determination. In flies, scute works to direct neuronal development, but this gene also acquired a role in the primary event of sex determination – X chromosome counting – by becoming an X chromosome signal element.

==== In myogenesis ====
Although proneural genes operate in the ectoderm, lethal of scute acts in the somatic mesoderm to define cell cluster from which muscle progenitors will be single out. The interaction between these cells and ectoderm, leads to the formation of muscle founder cells, in an analogous process to the one that occurs in the central nervous system.

==== In cell migration ====
ngn1 and ngn2 can regulate independently the mechanisms of the cell migration and are involved in the initial downregulation of RhoA right before neural progenitor cells become postmitotic, whereas neuroD is primarily involved in the continuous suppression of RhoA during the cortical migration. Other bHLH factors like math2, neuroD2 and nscl1 can suppress RhoA expression and regulate the migration machinery in postmitotic neurons.
