= Neurogenins =

Protein family

neurogenin 1

Identifiers
- Symbol: NEUROG1
- Alt. symbols: NEUROD3
- NCBI gene: 4762
- HGNC: 7764
- OMIM: 601726
- RefSeq: NM_006161
- UniProt: Q92886

Other data
- Locus: Chr. 5 q23-q31
Search for
- Structures: Swiss-model
- Domains: InterPro

neurogenin 2

Identifiers
- Symbol: NEUROG2
- NCBI gene: 63973
- HGNC: 13805
- OMIM: 606624
- RefSeq: NM_024019
- UniProt: Q9H2A3

Other data
- Locus: Chr. 4 q25
Search for
- Structures: Swiss-model
- Domains: InterPro

neurogenin 3

Identifiers
- Symbol: NEUROG3
- NCBI gene: 50674
- HGNC: 13806
- OMIM: 604882
- RefSeq: NM_020999
- UniProt: Q9Y4Z2

Other data
- Locus: Chr. 10 q21.3
Search for
- Structures: Swiss-model
- Domains: InterPro

Neurogenins, often abbreviated as Ngn, are a family of bHLH transcription factors involved in specifying neuronal differentiation. The family consisting of Neurogenin-1, Neurogenin-2, and Neurogenin-3, plays a fundamental role in specifying neural precursor cells and regulating the differentiation of neurons during embryonic development. It is one of many gene families related to the atonal gene in Drosophila. Other positive regulators of neuronal differentiation also expressed during early neural development include NeuroD and ASCL1.

== Function ==
Neurogenins primarily govern the transition of neural progenitor cells to neurons by activating specific downstream genes associated with neuronal differentiation. Their involvement spans various stages of neurogenesis, including the determination of neural progenitor identity, cell cycle exit, and the acquisition of neuronal characteristics. Notably, Neurogenins influence the specification of different neuronal subtypes, contributing to the diverse array of neurons within the central and peripheral nervous systems.

In neural crest cells, the neurogenin family is essential for neurogenesis in the developing dorsal root ganglia and development of the sensory lineage.

=== Regulation of neurogenic cascades ===
The activity of Neurogenins is intricately regulated by molecular pathways and environmental cues. Interaction with other transcription factors, such as proneural factors and Notch signaling, further refines the neurogenic cascades. Their spatiotemporal expression patterns and cross-regulation contribute to the exquisite precision required for proper neural development.

== Clinical implications ==
Neurogenins holds significant implications for clinical research, particularly in the context of neurodevelopmental disorders and neurological regeneration. Aberrations in the expression or regulation of Neurogenins have been linked to conditions such as autism spectrum disorders and neurodegenerative diseases. Ongoing research continues to explore the therapeutic potential of manipulating Neurogenin activity for neural repair and regeneration.

== Neurogenin-1 ==
Neurogenin 1 (Ngn1) is a Class-A basic-helix-loop-helix (bHLH) transcription factor that acts as a regulator for neuronal differentiation, and acts by binding to enhancer regulatory elements on genes that encode transcriptional regulators of neurogenesis. In order for Ngn1 to bind with high fidelity with genomic DNA, it must dimerize with another bHLH protein. Ngn1 is a proneural gene because its expression is seen prior to neural lineage determination, indicating it plays a role in neuronal differentiation.

=== Neuronal differentiation ===
In E14 rats, when Ngn1 is present in the cerebral cortex, it binds to the CBP/p300/Smad1 transcriptional co-activator complex, which recruits it to the enhancer box upstream of the gene in the promoter for neuronal genes. Binding of Ngn1, to the enhancer box, induces the transcription factor NeuroD to bind to its own enhancer boxes, inducing the genes involved in neuronal differentiation.

==== Regulation by BMP ====
Bone-morphogenetic-protein (BMP) signaling is responsible for the expression of the transcriptional co-activators CBP, p300, and Smad1. In the presence of Ngn1, BMPs promote neuronal differentiation in stem cells through binding of all endogenous CBP/p300/Smad1 to Ngn1, and being recruited toward the neuronal promoters, causing neuronal differentiation. In the embryonic forebrain, Ngn1 is associated with dorsal patterning and cell fate specification, with the patterning molecules and proneural proteins establishing the spatial domains of both proneural and homeodomain protein expression. This is critical for the initiation of neurogenesis.

==== Regulation by LIF ====
In the presence of Ngn1, the leukemia inhibitory factor (LIF) pathway is inhibited by Ngn1 blocking STAT activation. Normally, the STAT binding site promotes GFAP transcription through binding the STAT1/3 complex, which is activated through the LIF pathway.

=== Glial differentiation ===
Along with supporting neuronal differentiation, when expressed in embryonic neural tissue, Ngn1 also acts to inhibit glial differentiation. In the absence of Ngn1, the CBP/p300/Smad1 transcriptional co-activator complex is recruited to and binds to activated STAT1/3, which in turn causes the expression of GFAP, causing glial differentiation. In the presence of Ngn1, inhibition of gliogenesis occurs through Ngn1 binding to the CBP/p300/Smad1 transcriptional co-activator complex, recruiting it away from STAT1/3.

==== Regulation by BMP ====
In cases of low levels of Ngn1, BMPs promote glial differentiation. Since Ngn1 is the limiting factor, CBP/p300/Smad1 is able to interact with STAT1/3 and induce gliogenesis.

==== Regulation by Notch ====
Activation of the notch pathway, causes the inhibition of proneural bHLH genes, such as Ngn1, which allows for the CBP/p300/Smad1 to interact with STAT1/3 and induce gliogenesis. Along with the embryonic rat, it was also seen in zebrafish that the repression of Ngn1 by Notch, promotes glial lineage in neural crest and central nervous system formation through the inhibition of neuronal differentiation. In addition to the Notch pathway activating the transcriptional factors involved in the promotion of gliogenesis, it is possible that these same factors are involved in the inhibition of other fates.

==== Regulation by LIF ====
In the absence of Ngn1, the LIF pathway is able to activate STAT1/3, which allows for the promotion of GFAP transcription via the STAT binding site. The promotion of GFAP transcription induced glial differentiation.

== Neurogenin-2 ==
Neurogenin 2 (Ngn2) is a bHLH transcription factor involved in both neurogenesis and neural specification. This protein binds to enhancer-box regulatory elements on the promoters of many genes related to neurogenesis and neural specification. For sufficient DNA binding, Ngn2 must form a dimer with an enhancer protein.

=== Neurogenesis and glial inhibition ===
Ngn2 is a transcription factor that both increases expression of proneural genes and drives neural fate by inhibiting expression of glial genes in neural progenitor cells (NPCs). This was observed in mice lacking Ngn2 and mash-1 (another proneural bHLH transcription factor), which have more glia in the cortex and decreased capacity to generate neurons. Olig2 expression in what will become NPCs precedes Ngn2 and promotes its expression. During the switch from neural progenitor fate to glial fate, Ngn2 is downregulated and Nkx2.2, which inhibits proneural genes, is upregulated. Glial fate switch was reduced by inhibiting Nkx2.2 and Olig2 in neural progenitors while allowing the expression of Ngn2. The ability of Olig2 to induce expression of Ngn2 is reduced when Nkx2.2 is expressed.

=== Neural specification ===
Mice lacking Ngn2 have fewer motor neurons and ventral interneurons, indicating that Ngn2 plays a role in specification of these neurons.

==== Pan-neuronal fate ====
Heterodimerized Ngn2/enhancer protein complex can bind to enhancer boxes to promote transcription of genes related to a non-specified neuronal fate.

==== V2 interneuron fate ====
When an enhancer box of a promoter that has been bound by the Ngn-2/enhancer protein complex is also bound by a dimer of the adaptor nuclear LIM interactor (NLI) bound to two LIM homeobox protein 3 (Lhx3), genes related to V2 interneuron identity are expressed.

==== Motor neuron fate ====
A dimer of the adaptor NLI bound to two islet 1 (Isl1) proteins and each Isl1 is bound by Lhx3 is called the LIM-homeodomain (LIM-HD) transcription complex. When an enhancer box of a promoter that has been bound by the heterodimerized Ngn2/E-protein complex, the LIM-HD transcription complex is able to bind to drive expression of genes related to motor neuron fate, but only if Ngn2 has been properly phosphorylated.

Ngn2 has two serines, S231 and S234, which can be phosphorylated by glycogen synthase kinase 3 (Gsk3). Phosphorylation of Ngn2 enables interaction with LIM-homeodomain proteins, leading to ventral neural fate and motor neuron specification. The importance of this phosphorylation was determined by using mice that express a mutated form of Ngn2 protein which has the serines from the previously mentioned phosphorylation sites mutated into alanines, which cannot be phosphorylated. These mutant mice have a decreased number of motor neurons and an increased number of V2 interneurons, suggesting that phosphorylation is necessary for driving expression of genes related to motor neuron fate but not V2 interneuron fate and non-specified neural fate.

== Neurogenin-3 ==
Neurogenin 3 (Ngn3) is another member of the bHLH family of transcription factors. Ngn3 functions in the differentiation of endocrine pancreas cells. Although its key function is in the pancreas, intestinal cells and neural cells express Ngn3 as well. Several studies have highlighted the importance of Ngn3 for differentiation of endocrine cells. In mice, Ngn3 is present in cells as the pancreas begins to bud and glucagon cells are formed. There are several pathways that Ngn3 works through.

Ngn3 is a crucial component in pancreatic development and plays a supporting role in intestinal as well as neuronal cell development. Studies have demonstrated that knockout of Ngn3 in mice leads to death shortly after birth possibly due to after effects of severe diabetes. Further studies are taking place to investigate Ngn3's possible role as a treatment for diabetes and regeneration of cells in the pancreas.

Neurogenin 3 (NGN3) is expressed by 2-10% of acinar and duct cells in the histologically normal adult human pancreas. NGN3+ cells isolated from cultured exocrine tissue by coexpressed cell surface glycoprotein CD133 have a transcriptome consistent with exocrine dedifferentiation, a phenotype that resembles endocrine progenitor cells during development, and a capacity for endocrine differentiation in vitro. Human and rodent exocrine cells have been reprogrammed into cells with an islet cell-like phenotype following direct expression of NGN3 or manipulation that leads to its expression.

=== Phases of pancreatic development ===
The development of the pancreas is broken up into three phases, primary phase, secondary phase, and tertiary phase. Ngn3 is active in the primary and secondary phase. In the primary phase Ngn3 assists in α cell differentiation and in the secondary phase another wave of Ngn3 assists in differentiation of β cells, pancreatic polypeptide cells, and δ cells. Differentiation is marked as complete after the secondary phase. Ngn3 allows for the commitment of pancreatic progenitor cells to become an endocrine multipotent pro-precursor.

=== Modulation via notch pathway ===
The Notch pathway is one of the key modulators of Ngn3. The binding of Delta and Serrate, activation ligands for the Notch pathway, activates the Notch surface molecule. This allows the Notch intracellular domain to activate RBK-Jκ to translocate into the nucleus. This complex then activates hairy and enhancer of split (HES)-type proteins, which are inhibitors of Ngn3. The cells that allow the Notch/RBK-Jκ complex to enter are the ones that will not be differentiated into pancreatic cells because Ngn3 is suppressed. It is important to mention that Ngn3 has three HES1 binding sites adjacent to the TATA box sequence that allow for the regulation of this transcription factor.

=== Downstream targets of Ngn3 ===
==== NeuroD ====
Ngn3 can also activate the neurogenic differentiation factor 1(NeuroD1) like most of its other family members through the enhancer boxes present in its structure. Being that NeuroD1 is expressed along with Ngn3 in differentiating cells, it is considered one of the transcription factors downstream targets.

==== Pax4 ====
Another important target is paired box gene 4 (Pax4), which plays a major role in β cell and δ cell differentiation. Ngn3 works hand-in-hand with HNF1α to activate the Pax4 promoter to induce specific cell differentiation.

==== Nkx2.2 ====
Another transcription factor that may be a downstream target of Ngn3 is Nkx2.2 because it is often coexpressed with it. Studies have shown that disrupting Nkx2.2 expression results in problems with α and β cell differentiation.
