= François Guillemot =

French neurobiologist

François Guillemot FRS FMedSci
- Education: Ecole Normale Supérieure, Paris
- Known for: Behaviour of neural stem cells
- Scientific career
- Fields: Molecular neurobiology
- Workplaces: Harvard Medical School; Mount Sinai Hospital, Toronto; National Institute for Medical Research; Francis Crick Institute
- Website: Official website

François Guillemot (French: [fʁɑ̃swa ɡijmo]) is a French neurobiologist who works at the Francis Crick Institute in London. His research focuses on the behaviour of neural stem cells in embryos and adult brains.

== Life and career ==
After studying at the École Normale Supérieure in Paris, France, Guillemot took his Ph.D. in immunology at the Institut d’Embryologie du CNRS. This was followed by postdoctoral research at Harvard Medical School and Mount Sinai Hospital, Toronto. Between 1994 and 2002, Guillemot set up and ran a laboratory at the Institut de Génétique et de Biologie Moléculaire et Cellulaire in Strasbourg. He then relocated to the National Institute for Medical Research in London in 2002, where he was head of the Division of Molecular Neurobiology, before moving to the Francis Crick Institute the following decade. He has been President of the International Society for Developmental Neurobiology since 2009.

== Research ==
Guillemot's research investigates stem cells at the molecular level and how they become different types of cells in the brain. His research has focused on proneural genes, including ASCL1 (MASH1) and neurogenins 1,2 and 3. His two current strands of research are to understand the gene regulatory networks that control neural stem cells and the function of individual genes within these cells. By learning how neural cells form and develop, Guillemot hopes to develop new therapies for brain disorders.

== Awards ==
Guillemot was awarded the Ribeiro Caro Almela Prize for Research in Developmental Neurobiology in 2007. He was elected to the European Molecular Biology Organization (EMBO) in 2000, became a Fellow of the Academy of Medical Sciences (FMedSci) in 2009, and a Fellow of the Royal Society (FRS) in 2020.

== Selected publications ==
- Bertrand, Nicolas; Castro, Diogo S.; Guillemot, François (July 2002). "Proneural genes and the specification of neural cell types". Nature Reviews Neuroscience. 3 (7): 517–530. doi:10.1038/nrn874. eISSN 1471-0048. ISSN 1471-003X. PMID 12094208. S2CID 205512016.
- Gradwohl, Gérard; Dierich, Andrée; LeMeur, Marianne; Guillemot, François (15 February 2000). "neurogenin3 is required for the development of the four endocrine cell lineages of the pancreas". Proceedings of the National Academy of Sciences. 97 (4): 1607–1611. Bibcode:2000PNAS...97.1607G. doi:10.1073/pnas.97.4.1607. eISSN 1091-6490. ISSN 0027-8424. PMC 26482. PMID 10677506.
- Jensen, Jan; Pedersen, Erna Engholm; Galante, Philip; Hald, Jacob; Heller, R. Scott; et al. (January 2000). "Control of endodermal endocrine development by Hes-1". Nature Genetics. 24 (1): 36–44. doi:10.1038/71657. eISSN 1546-1718. ISSN 1061-4036. PMID 10615124. S2CID 52872659.
- Guillemot, François; Lo, Li-Ching; Johnson, Jane E.; Auerbach, Anna; Anderson, David J.; et al. (November 1993). "Mammalian achaete-scute homolog 1 is required for the early development of olfactory and autonomic neurons". Cell. 75 (3): 463–476. doi:10.1016/0092-8674(93)90381-Y. ISSN 0092-8674. PMID 8221886. S2CID 19459236.
