= Neurogenin-3 =

Mammalian protein found in Homo sapiens

NEUROG3

Identifiers
- Aliases: NEUROG3, Atoh5, Math4B, NGN-3, bHLHa7, ngn3, neurogenin 3
- External IDs: OMIM: 604882; MGI: 893591; GeneCards: NEUROG3

Gene location (Human)
Chr.	Chromosome 10 (human)
Band	10q22.1	Start	69,571,698 bp
Band	10q22.1	End	69,573,422 bp

Gene location (Mouse)
Chr.	Chromosome 10 (mouse)
Band	10|10 B4	Start	61,968,869 bp
Band	10|10 B4	End	61,970,542 bp
RNA expression pattern
Bgee	Human / Mouse (ortholog); Top expressed in: mucosa of transverse colon; duodenum; hippocampus proper; right adrenal cortex; rectum; smooth muscle tissue; right coronary artery; left adrenal gland; left adrenal cortex; serous sac / Top expressed in: layer of hippocampus; primordial pancreas; molecular layer of dentate gyrus; radiate layer of hippocampus; lumbar spinal ganglion; Paneth cell; migratory enteric neural crest cell; granular layer of dentate gyrus; Region II of hippocampus proper; oriens layer of hippocampus; More reference expression data
BioGPS	n/a
Gene ontology
Molecular function	DNA binding; protein dimerization activity; DNA-binding transcription factor activity; transcription coactivator activity; DNA-binding transcription activator activity, RNA polymerase II-specific; RNA polymerase II cis-regulatory region sequence-specific DNA binding; DNA-binding transcription repressor activity, RNA polymerase II-specific; protein binding; double-stranded DNA binding; chromatin DNA binding; DNA-binding transcription factor activity, RNA polymerase II-specific
Cellular component	cytoplasm; intracellular anatomical structure; nucleus
Biological process	neurogenesis; cell differentiation; peripheral nervous system development; regulation of transcription, DNA-templated; epithelial cell differentiation; hindbrain development; positive regulation of DNA-binding transcription factor activity; negative regulation of transcription by RNA polymerase II; transcription by RNA polymerase II; transcription, DNA-templated; nervous system development; regulation of dendrite morphogenesis; multicellular organism development; central nervous system development; positive regulation of neuron differentiation; positive regulation of cell differentiation; spinal cord development; forebrain development; positive regulation of transcription by RNA polymerase II; transdifferentiation; endocrine pancreas development
Sources:Amigo / QuickGO
Orthologs
Databases	NCBI: entry; OMA: entry
Species	Human	Mouse
Entrez	50674	11925
Ensembl	ENSG00000122859	ENSMUSG00000044312
UniProt	Q9Y4Z2	P70661
RefSeq (mRNA)	NM_020999	NM_009719
RefSeq (protein)	NP_066279	NP_033849
Location (UCSC)	Chr 10: 69.57 – 69.57 Mb	Chr 10: 61.97 – 61.97 Mb
PubMed search
- Wikidata
View/Edit Human	View/Edit Mouse

Neurogenin-3 (NGN3) is a protein that in humans is encoded by the Neurog3 gene.

Neurogenin-3 is a pro-endocrine transcription factor that is a member of the basic helix-loop-helix (bHLH) transcription factor and has a primary function of activating gene transcription in endocrine progenitor cells. It is a master regulator of pancreatic islet differentiation and regeneration and functions to directly enhance the expression of the lineage-committed transcription factors required for the differentiation of the endocrine progenitor cells into each of the endocrine cell subtypes.

== Expression ==
Neurogenin3 is expressed in a small percentage of cells within the developing pancreas consisting of endocrine progenitor cells. It is expressed in the three stages of the development and differentiation of the endocrine pancreas. These stages are termed the

1. First or primary transition stage which involves the specification and growth of a primitive stalk of primarily undifferentiated pancreatic epithelial cells, originating from two separate sites along the gut tube which later fuse to become a single organ.
2. Second transition stage which is the period when the majority of endocrine cell differentiation occurs and the growing stalk of uncommitted pancreatic progenitors undergoes a branching morphogenesis and extensive endocrine and exocrine cytodifferentiation occurs and finally.
3. Third transition stage where the individual differentiated endocrine cells (α,β,δ and PP cells) migrate away from the progenitor cell domain at the core of the developing pancreas and coalesce into islets of Langerhans.

The significance of NGN3 in endocrine cell development is shown by the fact that Neurog3 deficiency prevents the generation of all pancreatic and intestinal endocrine cells. Ectopic overexpression of Neurog3 leads to reduced endocrine mass as well, but by a mechanism that is different from that of Neurog3 deficiency. Overexpression of Neurog3 throughout the uncommitted pancreatic progenitor domain induces premature differentiation of the progenitor cell population into the endocrine lineage, effectively depleting the pool of multi-potent progenitor cells prior to their expansion resulting in a reduction in the overall mass of pancreatic endocrine tissue. These data point at a tight regulation of Neurog3 expression to maintain the proper size and cell composition of the endocrine pancreas.

Genetic mutations in Neurogenin3 have been often found to cause neonatal diabetes and the significance of neurogenin3 has also been further shown using invitro analysis where neurogenin3 was found to required for the development of mature human beta cells from pluripotent stem cells.

== Role in pancreatic tissue development ==
Neurogenin-3 is required for the development of endocrine pancreatic precursors for the four pancreatic endocrine cell types composed in the Islets of Langerhans: α-, β-, δ-, and pancreatic polypeptide (PP) cells, which produce the hormones glucagon, insulin, somatostatin, and PP respectively.

Neurogenin-3 producing cells are is located within or adjacent to the pancreatic ducts, which are thought to produce endocrine precursors.

In the absence of Neurogenin-3, expression of ISL1, PAX4, PAX6, and NeuroD are lost and endocrine precursors are lacking in the pancreatic epithelium. Neurogenin-3 absence also results in the absence of both insulin and glucagon detected normally at stages E15.5 and E9.5 in mouse embryos.

Tissues lacking Neurogenin-3 result in an abnormal exocrine tissue phenotype nearly identical to that of tissues with the loss of NeuroD expression. This phenotype is composed of abnormal cell polarity with nuclei having random positions and an abundant accumulation of Acinar cells and Zymogen granules.

== Transcription regulators for beta cell development ==
Transcription factors control gene expression by interacting with enhancer sequences. The transcription factors pancreas/duodenum homeobox protein 1 (PDX1), Neurogenin-3 (NEUROG3), and V-maf musculoaponeurotic fibrosarcoma oncogene homolog A (MAFA) are required for beta cell growth and differentiation. NEUROG3 governs islet differentiation and restoration and is expressed in endocrine progenitor cells. PDX1 is required for the formation of exocrine and endocrine cells in the pancreas, especially beta cells. PDX1 also attaches to regulatory regions, causing insulin gene transcription to rise. Similarly, MAFA binds to the insulin gene's enhancer/promoter region and stimulates insulin production in response to glucose. PDX1, NEUROG3, and/or MAFA have been effectively used to convert numerous cell types into insulin-producing cells in vitro and in vivo, including pancreatic exocrine cells, hepatocytes, and pluripotent stem cells, in addition to their natural roles in beta cell formation and maturation. In this paper, we look at the biological features of PDX1, NEUROG3, and MAFA, as well as their applications and limitations in beta cell regeneration. A PubMed search for papers published between 1990 and 2017 was used to find the primary source literature for this review. Diabetes, insulin, trans-differentiation, stem cells, and regenerative medicine are all search phrases.
