= Hugo J. Bellen =

American geneticist

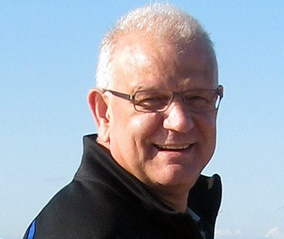
- Born: 1953 (age 72–73)
- Citizenship: USA
- Education: Vrije Universiteit Brussel; University of Antwerp; Ghent University; University of California, Davis
- Scientific career
- Fields: Genetics, Developmental Biology, Neuroscience
- Workplaces: Baylor College of Medicine, Howard Hughes Medical Institute
- Doctoral advisor: John A. Kiger Jr.
- Other academic advisors: Walter J. Gehring, postdoctoral advisor

Hugo J. Bellen is a professor at Baylor College of Medicine and an investigator emeritus at the Howard Hughes Medical Institute who studies genetics and neurobiology in the model organism, Drosophila melanogaster, the fruit fly.

== Education and career ==
Hugo Bellen is a Distinguished Service Professor at Baylor College of Medicine (BCM) in the Departments of Molecular and Human Genetics and Neuroscience and an Investigator Emeritus at the Howard Hughes Medical Institute. Originally from Belgium, Dr. Bellen earned a degree in Business Engineering from the Solvay School of Business at the University of Brussels, a Pre-Veterinary Medicine degree from the University of Antwerp and a doctoral degree in Veterinary Medicine from the University of Ghent. He received his Ph.D. in Genetics from the University of California at Davis and completed postdoctoral research in the laboratory of Dr. Walter Gehring at the University of Basel in Switzerland. He started his independent career as an HHMI Investigator at BCM in 1989 and joined the Neurological Research Institute at Texas Children's Hospital at its inception in 2011.

Dr. Bellen's group has made significant contributions to the understanding of nervous system development, synaptic transmission and mechanisms of neurodegeneration. His laboratory has developed numerous sophisticated genetic tools and generated reagents that have transformed Drosophila biology.

Dr. Bellen's current research focuses on the discovery of new human disease genes and elucidating pathogenic mechanisms of neurodevelopmental and neurodegenerative diseases using fruit flies in collaborations with human geneticists worldwide. His lab is the home of the Model Organisms Screening Center for the Undiagnosed Diseases Network of the National Institutes of Health. In the past few years he has made major strides in solving key problems related to Friedreich's ataxia, Alzheimer's disease, amyotrophic lateral sclerosis, and Parkinson's disease.

Dr. Bellen has trained 38 graduate students, including 7 MSTP students, and 43 postdoctoral fellows who are successful in careers in academia and industry. Currently, 18 trainees are in the lab, including a mix of graduate students and postdoctoral fellows. Dr. Bellen received the BCM Presidential Award for Excellence in Leadership in Science and Research mentoring in 2018.

Dr. Bellen has organized numerous national and international meetings. He is currently co-organizer of TAGC 2020, The Allied Genetics Conference to be held in Washington, DC in 2020. He served as a member of the editorial board of the Journal of Cell Biology for 15 years, and is currently serving as a member of the editorial boards of eLife, PLoS Biology, and Genetics. He is the chair of the scientific advisory board of the Bloomington Drosophila Stock Center, and is a member of the scientific advisory boards of FlyBase, the NHGRI Alliance of Genome Resources, the Gill Center for Biomolecular Science, and the INADcure Foundation. He was previously on the scientific advisory boards of the Max Planck Institute in Göttingen, Germany, the Academia Sinica in Taipei, Taiwan, the KAIST in Daejeon, Korea, and the VIB in Leuven, Belgium.

Dr. Bellen's awards include the Gruber Award in Genetics 2024; the George Beadle Award from the Genetics Society of America; the Linda & Jack Gill Distinguished Neuroscience Investigator Award from Indiana University; the Miegunyah Distinguished Visiting Fellowship from the University of Melbourne; the Distinguished Alumnus Award from the University of California, Davis; the Michael E. DeBakey, MD, Excellence in Research Award, and the Dean's Faculty Award for Excellence in Graduate Education from Baylor College of Medicine. Dr. Bellen served as the Director of the BCM Graduate Program in Developmental Biology for more than 20 years. He is also the March of Dimes Professor in Developmental Biology and the Charles Darwin Professor in Genetics at Baylor College of Medicine. He is a member of the American Academy of Arts & Sciences and a member of the National Academy of Sciences.

== Current Positions ==
Professor
Baylor College of Medicine

Distinguished Service Professor
Molecular & Human Genetics Baylor College of Medicine

March of Dimes Chair in Developmental Biology
Baylor College of Medicine

Chair in Neurogenetics
Jan and Dan Duncan Neurological Research Institute

== Research ==
=== Neurodegeneration ===
Dr. Bellen's current research focuses on an effort to decipher the mechanisms by which mutations in specific genes cause neurodegeneration, and to this end, he and his colleagues performed unbiased forward genetic screens in fruitflies that detect the progressive decline in function and morphology of photoreceptor neurons. To date over 165 genes that cause a neurodegenerative phenotype when mutated have been uncovered by Dr. Bellen's group using this strategy. Many of these genes encode homologues of human genes that are known to cause neurodegenerative diseases, including amyotrophic lateral sclerosis (ALS) (Lou Gehrig's disease), Charcot-Marie-Tooth (CMT), Parkinson's disease (PD), Alzheimer's disease (AD), Leigh syndrome, and others, and these studies will help provide a much better understanding of the molecular mechanisms by which neurodegeneration occurs. A prevailing theme among these mutants seems to be dysfunction of the neuronal mitochondria and an increasing inability to deal with oxidative stress, which manifests as lipid droplets.

=== Technology ===
Bellen has pioneered the development of novel technologies that accelerate Drosophila research and are currently used by the majority of fly labs today. Bellen was a leader in the development of P element-mediated enhancer detection which allows for discovery and manipulation of genes and was the impetus for a collaborative and ongoing project to generate an insertion collection for the community. Furthermore, Bellen and colleagues devised a new transformation technology that permits site-specific integration of very large DNA fragments, which led to the generation of a collection of flies carrying molecularly defined duplications for more than 90% of the Drosophila X-chromosome. Hundreds of Drosophila researchers utilize this collection. Most recently his lab created a new transposable element (MiMIC) that permits even more downstream manipulations via RMCE (recombinase-mediated cassette exchange), such as protein tagging and knockdown and large scale homologous recombination. His research constantly evolves with the changing technology to meet the needs of the Drosophila community.

=== Neurotransmitter release ===
Bellen has made numerous important contributions in the field of synaptic transmission in Drosophila. Through unbiased forward genetic screens designed to detect perturbations in neuronal function, he has uncovered many genes involved in synaptic transmission and has used reverse genetics to help to establish their function. His lab was the first to provide in vivo evidence that Synaptotagmin 1 functions as the main Calcium sensor in synaptic transmission and that Syntaxin-1A plays a critical role in synaptic vesicle (SV) fusion in vivo. His lab showed that Endophilin and Synaptojanin control uncoating of SVs, that the V0 component of the v-ATPase affects SV fusion, that synaptic mitochondria control SV dynamics, and in addition discovered a novel calcium channel involved in SV biogenesis. His pioneering work on synaptic vesicle trafficking molecules was later confirmed in the mouse.

=== Neuronal Development ===
Bellen and colleagues made important contributions to our understanding of Drosophila peripheral nervous system development and the fine-tuning of aspects of Notch signaling during this process. These discoveries were made by carrying out multiple forward genetic screens using the mutagen, ethyl methane sulfonate, as well as P elements. They discovered the protein Senseless that is required for the development of the peripheral nervous system by boosting the action of proneural proteins and suppressing the action of Enhancer of split proteins. They also discovered the protein Rumi and determined it was required for O-glycosylation of Notch at many different sites and found that these sites affect the cleavage of Notch at the membrane. Their research also uncovered a critical amino acid of the Notch protein that modulates its binding with Serrate. Finally, they helped elucidate the functions of several other proteins involved in the Notch pathway, including the roles of Wasp/Arp2/3, Sec15, Tempura, and EHBP-1 in Delta processing and signaling.

== Awards and honors ==
- 1983 - Fulbright Award
- 1986-1987 - N.A.T.O. Fellowship
- 1995 - Michael E. DeBakey, M.D., Excellence in Research Award
- 1999 - The Dean's Faculty Award for Excellence in Graduate Education
- 1999 - Charles Darwin Chair in Genetics
- 2000 - The March of Dimes Chair in Developmental Biology
- 2010 - Distinguished Service Professor of BCM
- 2011 - Distinguished Alumnus Award, University of California, Davis
- 2012 - The Linda and Jack Gill Distinguished Neuroscience Investigator Award
- 2014 - George W. Beadle Award
- 2015 - Miegunyah Distinguished Fellowship of the University of Melbourne
- 2016 - Michael E. DeBakey, M.D., Excellence in Research Award
- 2020 - Member of the United States National Academy of Sciences
- 2020 - Member of the American Academy of Arts and Sciences
- 2024 - Gruber Prize in Genetics

== Personal life ==
As a younger man, Dr. Bellen worked as a bar bouncer in his native Belgium. Dr. Bellen rides a 1960's vintage motorcycle to work every day.
