= Zinc finger protein 800 =

Protein found in humans

ZNF800

Identifiers
- Aliases: ZNF800, zinc finger protein 800
- External IDs: MGI: 1889334; GeneCards: ZNF800

Gene location (Human)
Chr.	Chromosome 7 (human)
Band	7q31.33	Start	127,346,790 bp
Band	7q31.33	End	127,431,924 bp

Gene location (Mouse)
Chr.	Chromosome 6 (mouse)
Band	6|6 A3.2- A3.3	Start	28,239,926 bp
Band	6|6 A3.2- A3.3	End	28,398,004 bp
RNA expression pattern
Bgee	Human / Mouse (ortholog); Top expressed in: bone marrow cell; Achilles tendon; islet of Langerhans; white blood cell; monocyte; granulocyte; skin of leg; smooth muscle tissue; lymph node; pancreatic ductal cell / Top expressed in: spermatocyte; tail of embryo; Paneth cell; Rostral migratory stream; genital tubercle; seminal vesicula; spermatid; lobe of prostate; spleen; lumbar subsegment of spinal cord; More reference expression data
BioGPS	n/a
Gene ontology
Molecular function	DNA binding; metal ion binding; nucleic acid binding; DNA-binding transcription factor activity, RNA polymerase II-specific
Cellular component	nucleus
Biological process	regulation of transcription, DNA-templated; transcription, DNA-templated; regulation of transcription by RNA polymerase II
Sources:Amigo / QuickGO
Orthologs
Databases	NCBI: entry; OMA: entry
Species	Human	Mouse
Entrez	168850	627049
Ensembl	ENSG00000048405	ENSMUSG00000039841
UniProt	Q2TB10	Q0VEE6
RefSeq (mRNA)	NM_176814	NM_001081678; NM_001364595; NM_001364596
RefSeq (protein)	NP_789784	NP_001075147; NP_001351524; NP_001351525
Location (UCSC)	Chr 7: 127.35 – 127.43 Mb	Chr 6: 28.24 – 28.4 Mb
PubMed search
- Wikidata
View/Edit Human	View/Edit Mouse

Zinc Finger Protein 800 or ZNF800 is a protein that in humans is encoded by the ZNF800 gene. The specific function of ZNF800 is not yet well understood by the scientific community.

== Gene ==
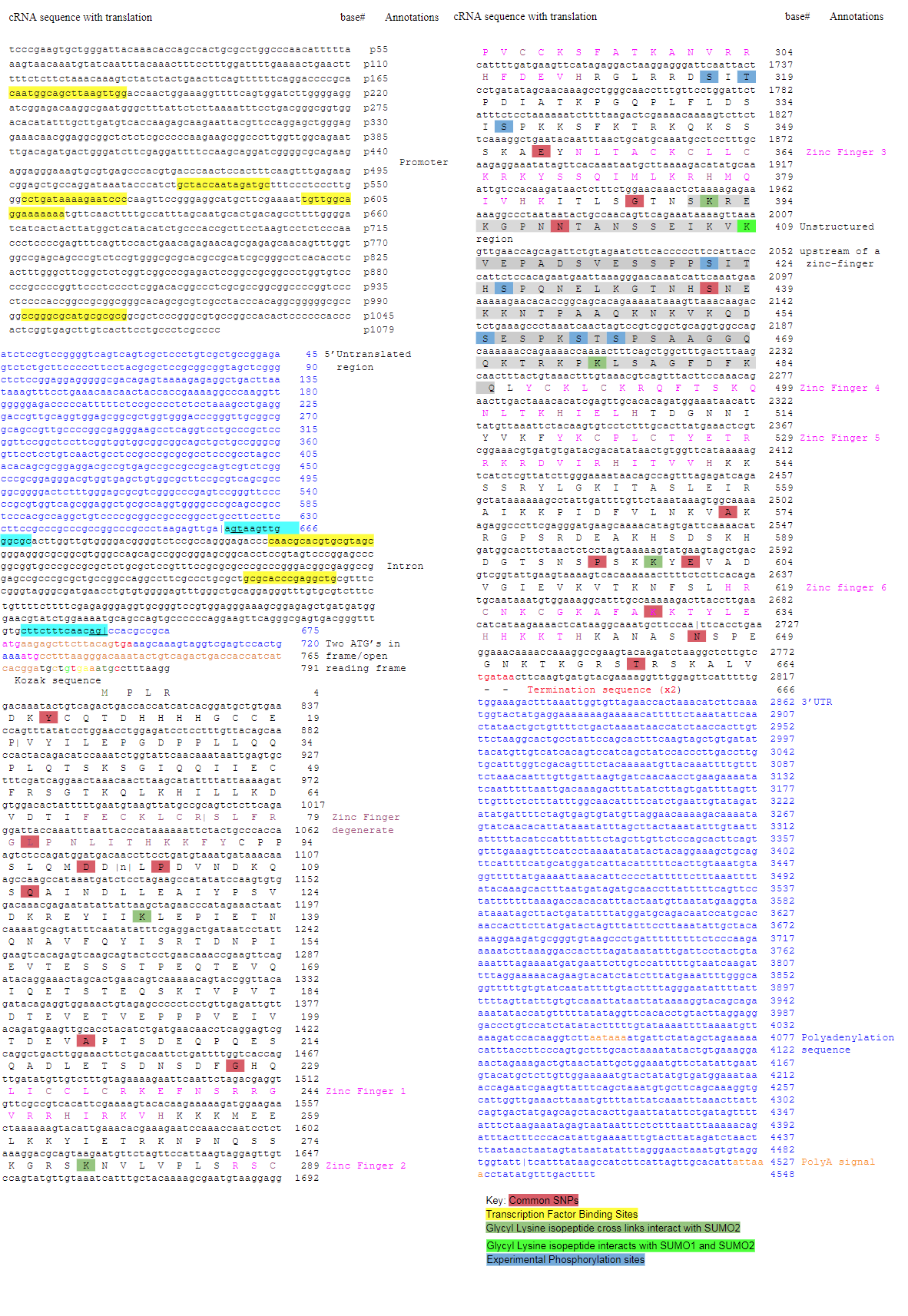
This conceptual translation highlights the zinc finger domains, phosphorylation sites, sumoylation sites, SNP's, and important DNA sequences of human ZNF800.

The ZNF800 gene is between 127373344bp and 127391557bp on the reverse strand of Chromosome 7, locus 7q31.33, spanning a total of 18214 base pairs. It has a predicted molecular weight of 75,235.79 g/mol and a predicted isoelectric point of 9.54. The gene codes for 7 exons and is translated into 664 amino acids. Only 4 exons are in the coding region of the gene and make up the ZNF800 protein, but there is a total of 6. Another name for ZNF800 is PP902. ZNF800 contains 6 functioning C2H2 zinc finger protein domains, a number of SNP's, and multiple experimentally-shown phosphorylation and SUMOylation sites.

=== Neighborhood ===
ZNF800 is in the neighborhood of PAX4, which plays an important role in the differentiation and development of pancreatic islet beta cells.

== Zinc finger protein family ==
ZNF800 is part of a large zinc finger protein family, and several other members of this family have previously been described. Zinc finger proteins have both DNA binding and metal (zinc) binding properties. They are found in the cell nucleus. When compared to other members of the zinc finger protein family, ZNF800 has only 48-34% similarity to its closest zinc finger protein relatives. However, several zinc finger regions and possible nucleotide binding sites are conserved.

== Transcript ==
The protein is made in small amounts, potentially due to the unfavorability of its Kozak sequence as compared to that of more favorable proteins.

== Protein ==
Potential layout of the zinc finger protein 800 with significant regions highlighted, such as conserved areas of unknown function in grey, zinc finger regions in green, and unstructured region upstream of the zinc finger in blue.

ZNF800 is ubiquitously expressed in at least 27 different tissues, with the largest amounts in bone marrow, testis, and lymph nodes. The ZNF800 protein contains 6 C2H2 zinc finger regions, 4 of which are conserved in paralogs, and 5 of which are conserved in orthologs of ZNF800. It also has two larger regions of unknown function, which are conserved in orthologs, and several key amino acids, the function of which in this particular protein has not yet been discovered.

== Gene level regulation ==
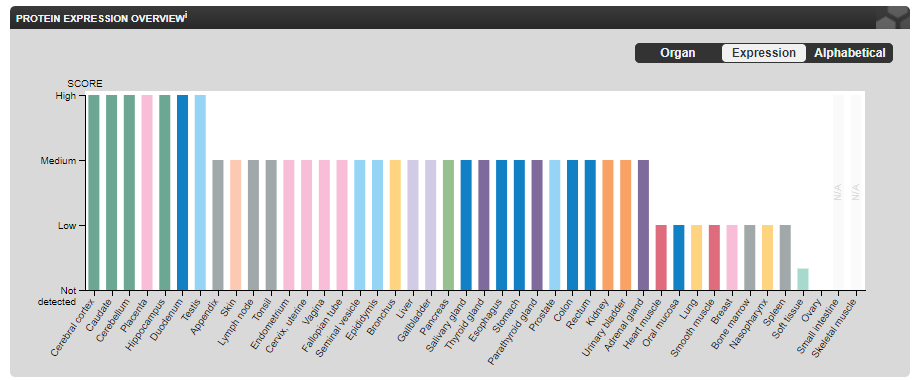
Graph of tissue specific expression of ZNF800 in humans from The Human Protein Atlas.

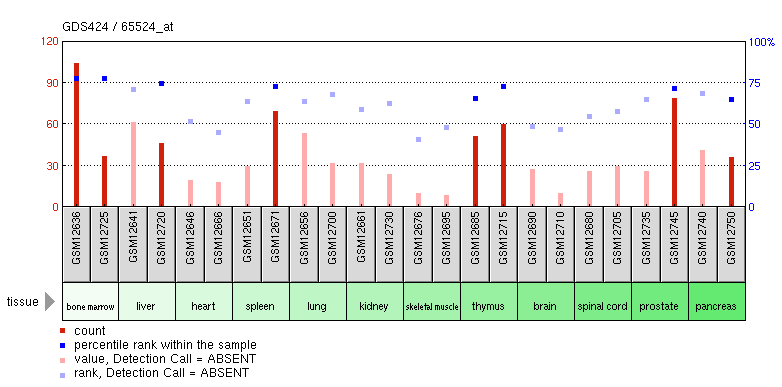
This graph shows levels of ZNF800 in human tissues from experimental values on GEO Profile accessed with "GDS 424".

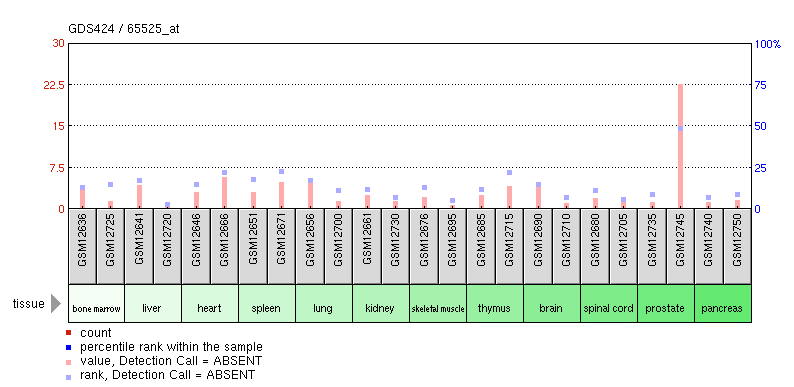
This graph shows experimental tissue specific expression of ZNF800 in humans found on GEO Profiles when searching "GDS 424".

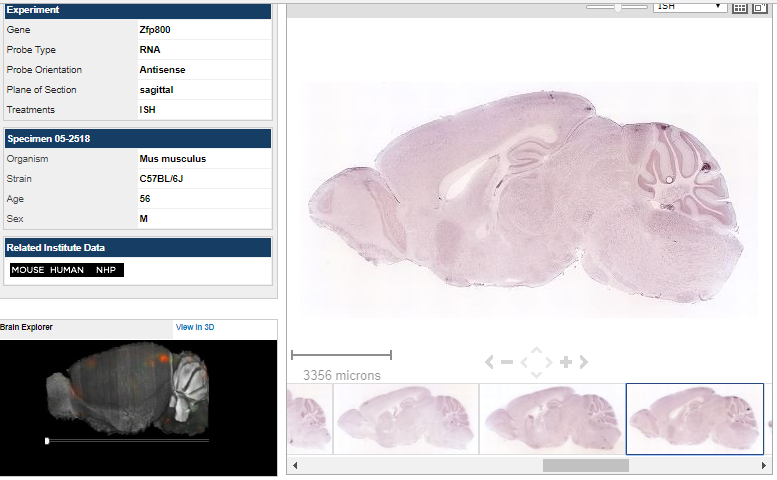
Allen Brain Atlas image of ZNF800 Expression in the mouse brain. This shows ubiquitous expression in low levels.

The promoter for ZNF800 was predicted to be between 127391456 bp and 127393803bp, spanning 2348 base pairs. This is located directly before the gene sequence. Several transcription factor binding sites were identified in this area. ZNF800 is expressed ubiquitously throughout the body at low levels. There does seem to be increased expression in the blood and thymus, but the evidence for this is somewhat contradictory. NCBI GEO Profiles across all tissues revealed the following expression levels in tissues throughout the body: highest expression of ZNF800 in bone marrow, liver, spleen and thymus. In situ hybridization data of ZNF800 in the mouse brain from Allen Brain Atlas showed ubiquitous expression of ZNF800 in the brain in low levels (Figure: "Mouse Brain ZNF800 Expression").

== Transcript level regulation ==
Looking at the intron sequences next to the beginning and end of each exon and comparing those to favorable ones, it was found that all of the splice regions on ZNF800 are favorable. This explains why there are no shorter ZNF800 isoforms.

== Protein level regulation ==
Several different tools were used on ExPASy Proteomics to analyze ZNF800 for likely protein modification sites, unique composition, and localization. The composition of human ZNF800 was compared to that of the Mummichog ZNF800, which has a 46% identity to the human ZNF800. Several different programs showed that ZNF800 is likely localized to the nucleus and does not contain any trans-membrane domains. Human ZNF800 is rich in lysine and poor in glycine and tryptophan, while the mummichog ZNF800 is rich in serine.

Species	Homo Sapiens (human) ZNF800	Fundulus heterclitus (Mummichog fish) ZNF800
Identity	100%	46%
Number of Amino Acids	664	914
Theoretical Isoelectric Point	9.54	9.60
Theoretical Molecular Weight	75,235.79 g/mol	100,454.56 g/mol
Comparative Compositional Analysis Extremes	G− : 24( 3.6%) K+ : 81(12.2%) S : 64( 9.6%) W− : 0( 0.0%)	G : 39( 4.3%) K : 63( 6.9%) S+ :128(14.0%) W : 5( 0.5%)
Hydrophobic Segments	None	None
Transmembrane Segments	none	none
Important Carbon Spacings	multiple zinc finger binding regions	multiple zinc finger binding regions
Negative Charge Clusters	(cmin = 10/30 or 13/45 or 16/60): 1) From 185 to 225: DTEVETVEPPPVEIVTDEVAPTSDEQPQESQADLETSDNSD	(cmin = 10/30 or 13/45 or 16/60): 1) From 555 to 577: EEAVEASDDDDDIDSSPAPSPAE

Multiple programs showed that ZNF800 is likely to be a nuclear protein. NetPhos was used to predict the most likely phosphorylation sites (>0.99). These were compared to experimentally shown phosphorylation sites found on NCBI Nucleotide and matching phosphorylation sites were bolded. Experimentally shown sumoylation sites were also included. The likely sites of Phosphorilation, O-Glycosilation, Sumoylation, and O-ß-GlcNAc attachment are detailed below:

Type of Post-Translational Modification	Program Name (all programs found at ExPASy Proteomics)	Program Mission	Human ZNF800 Results	Degree of Certainty (when applicable)	Conserved region? (N/A when applied to whole protein)
**Protein sorting**	DAS-TMfilter server	Find transmembrane protein domain	ZNF800 is not a transmembrane protein		N/A
	PSORT II	Determine where in the cell the protein sorts to	ZNF800 sorts to the nucleus	100%	N/A
	NNCN: Reinhardt's method for Cytplasmic/Nuclear discrimination	Discriminate between cytoplasmic and nuclear proteins	ZNF800 is a nuclear protein	94.1%	N/A
	k-NN	Determine where in the cell the protein sorts to	ZNF800 is a nuclear protein	100%	N/A
	NUCDISC: discrimination of nuclear localization signals	Locate nuclear localization signal	pat4: HKKK (3) at 253 pat4: RKPK (4) at 473 pat4: RRKR (5) at 529 pat7: none bipartite: RRGVRRHIRKVHKKKME at 242 bipartite: KRDVIRHITVVHKKSSR at 531 content of basic residues: 17.8% NLS Score: 1.27		Yes
	Checking 63 PROSITE DNA binding motifs:	Find prosite DNA binding motifs	Zinc finger, C2H2 type, domains: 1) CCLCRKEFNS RRGVRRHIRKVH at 232 2) CPVC1CKSFAT KANVRRHFDEVH at 289 3)CKCLLCKRKY SSQIMLKRHMQIVH at 359 4) CKLCKRQFT SKQNLTKHIELH at 488 5)CNKCGKAFAK KTYLEHHKKTH at 620		Yes
**Phosphorylation**	NetPhos	Serines and threonines that are likely to be phosphorylated	214 S, **317 S**, **336 S**, 348 S, 349 S, 415 S, **457 S**, **460 S**, **462 S**, 578 S, 585 S, 587 S, 597 S, 647 S	> 0.99	Yes
	NCBI Nucleotide	Serines and threonines have been experimentally shown to be phosphorylated	Phosphorylation regions: **317 S**, 319 T, **336 S**, 422 S, 426 S, 455 S, **457 S**, **460 S**, **462 S**		
**O-Glycosylation**	NetOGlycocilation	Serines and threonines that are likely to be O-glycosylated	159, 317, 424, 645	>0.9	Yes
**O-ß-GlcNAc attachment sites**	YingOYang	Serines and threonines that are likely to have O-ß-GlcNAc attachment sites	38T, 157 T, 207 S, 460 S, 461 T, 593S, 653 T, 660 S	++ and +++	Yes
**Sumoylation**	Uniprot	Experimentally confirmed lysines that interact with SUMO-1 and SUMO-2	132K, 279K, 392K, 409K, 471K, 599K		

== Homology / Evolution ==
=== Paralogs of ZNF800 ===
ZNF800 has 5 possible paralogs, however, all of these had a maximum identity of 33%, so it is unlikely they are true paralogs of ZNF800. They may just be similar because they are all zinc finger proteins and contain zinc finger binding domains. When multiple sequence alignments were made, the zinc finger binding domains were the areas with the most conservation.

Paralogs	Accession	Length	Query	ID	Similarity	E
ZNF837	NP_612475.1	531	26%	24%	36%	2e-04
ZNFI3	NP_443114.1	472	23%	25%	44%	3e-04
ZNF366	NP_689838.1	744	12%	33%	48%	4e-04
ZNF335	NP_071378.1	1342	24%	21%	34%	0.007
ZNF260	NP_001012774.1	412	23%	25%	46%	0.007

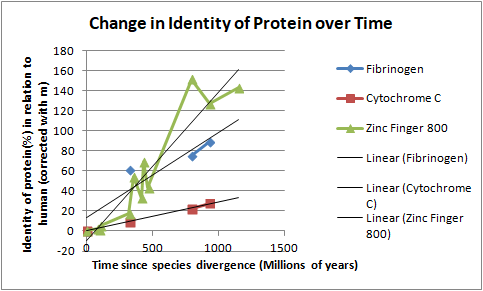
This graph was made using calculations of m and n where n is 100-% identity of a protein and m=-ln(1-n/100)*100. Identity percentages were found using BLAST.

=== Orthologs of ZNF800 ===
ZNF800 has homologs in trichoplax, invertebrates, fish, amphibians, reptiles, birds, and mammals. Based on the found E values of the protein with its orthologs in the aforementioned categories using NCBI Blast, ZNF800 is at least 930 Millions of years old. At first it was hypothesized that ZNF800 has an Ortholog in fungus, dating back to 1150 Millions of years ago, however, a BLAT search of the fungus sequence in the human domain gave no results, which lead to the conclusion that these sequences are not similar enough to prove they are truly related.

Sequence #	Genus + Species	Common name	Date of divergence	Accession #	Sequence length ( aa)	Sequence ID	Notes
1	Galeopterus variegatus	Sunda flying lemur	82 MYA	XP_008569698.1	665	98%	
2	Pteropus alecto	Black flying fox	94 MYA	ELK13892.1	676	99%	
3	Enhydra lutris kenyoni	Sea otter	94 MYA	XP_022365796.1	726	98%	
4	Elephantulus edwardii	Cape elephant shrew	102 MYA	XP_006896138.1	665	95%	
5	Gavialis gangeticus	Gharial crocodile	320 MYA	XP_019364835.1	666	86%	
6	Xenopus tropicalis	Western clawed frog	353 MYA	NP_001120895.1	690	58%	
7	Latimeria chalumnae	West Indian Ocean coelacanth	414 MYA	XP_005994297.1	708	72%	
8	Fundulus heteroclitus	Mummichog	432 MYA	XP_012726041.1	914	46%	
9	Rhincodon typus	Whale shark	465 MYA	XP_020372543.1	713	65%	
10	Limulus polyphemus	Spider	794 MYA	XP_022245667.1	796	21%	
11	Trichoplax adhaerens	Trichoplax	930 MYA	XP_002111948.1	735	28%	E: 0.003, this large number may indicate it is not an ortholog

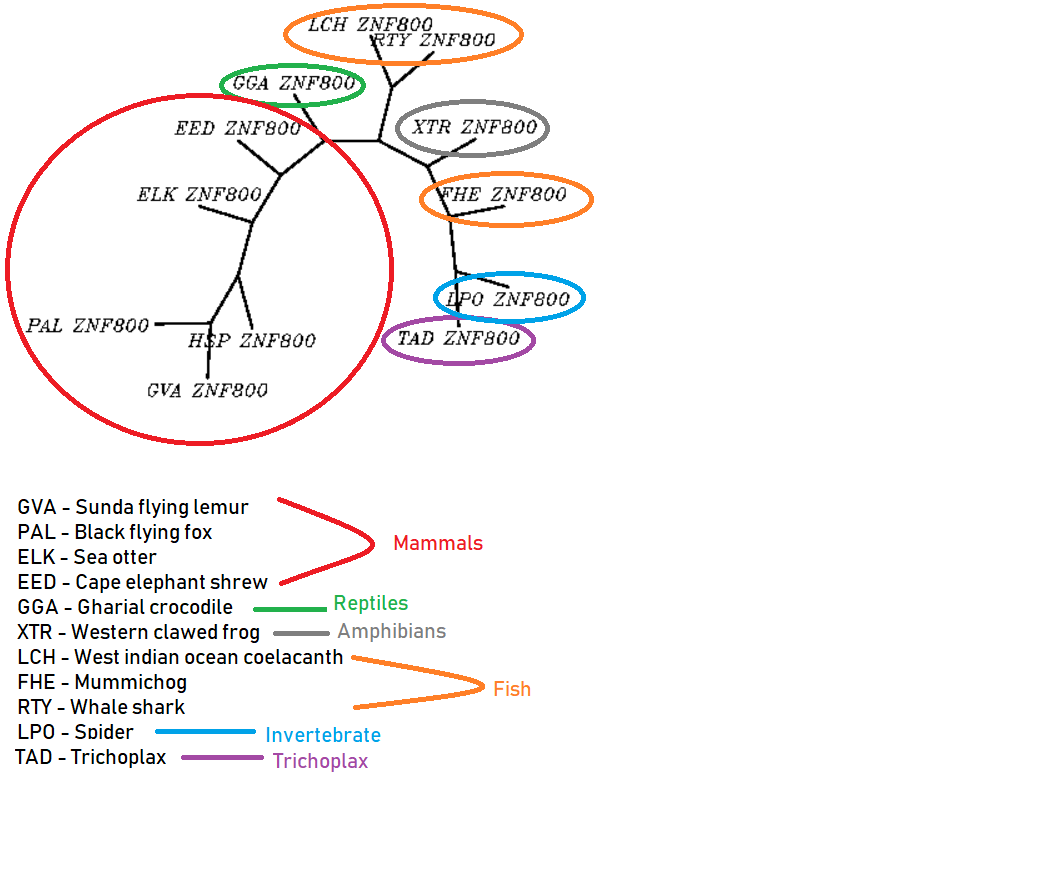
This tree from Clustal W shows an unrooted phylogenetic tree of the ZNF800 orthologs showing relatedness and animal type.

== Interacting Proteins ==
The most common transcription factors with high probability (>0.84) of binding ZNF800 promoter are shown in the figure. These were found using the ElDorado genome database on Genomatrix.

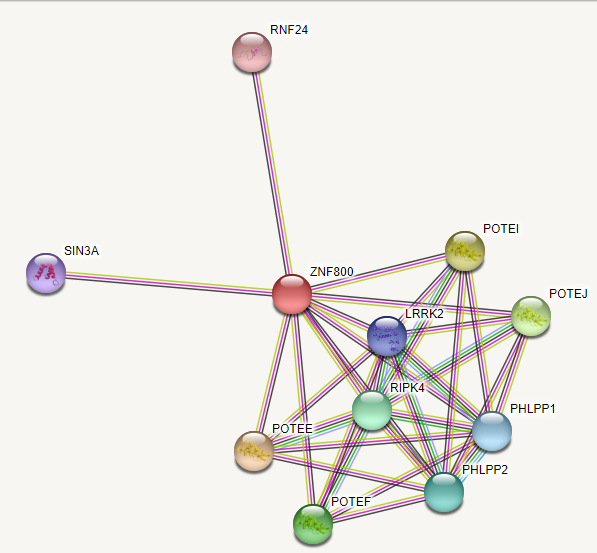
STRING Prediction of ZNF800 interacting proteins.

A few potential interacting proteins (depicted in Figure "Proteins Predicted to Interact with ZNF800" on the right) were found using STRING and yscP, plague bacteria, was shown to bind ZNF800 using Y2H data.

== Clinical Significance ==
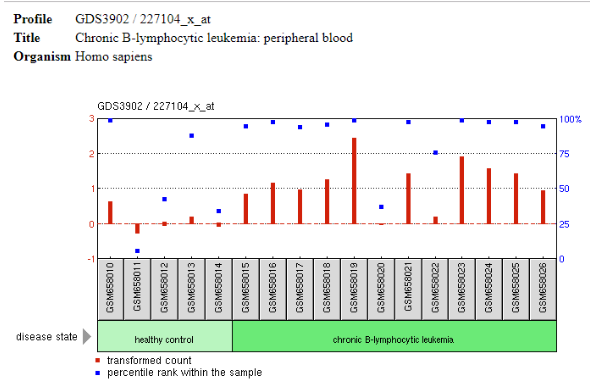
This image from GEO Profiles of ZNF800 shows a correlation between expression of ZNF800 and chronic B-lymphocytic leukemia.

While there is no obvious link so far between ZNF800 and specific diseases it may cause, several studies on GEO Profiles have shown a correlation between ZNF800 and disease condition, including a correlation between increased ZNF800 expression and chronic B-lymphocytic leukemia (ZNF800 GEO Profile 1), as well as a correlation between decreased ZNF800 expression and myotonic dystrophy type 2 (GEO Profile of ZNF800 Figure 2).

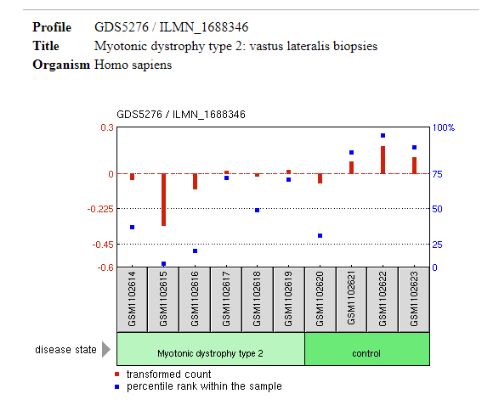
This image from GEO Profiles of ZNF800 shows a relationship between patients with myotonic dystrophy type 2 and control. Based on the graph, control patients have significantly higher ZNF800 expression than patients with myotonic dystrophy, suggesting there may be some relationship.

The 20 most common SNP's in the protein coding sequence of ZNF800 were analyzed, of these, the most common was still found in only 10% of the population. Of these mutations, none were in the zinc finger binding portions of ZNF800.

== Suggested Reading ==
Articles discussing ZNF800 are limited. There are 4 existing patents mention ZNF800 in lists of 100s-1000s, which address concepts such as "prostate cancer progression", "progression risk of glaucoma", "method for inducing pluripotency in human somatic cells", and "modifying transcriptional regulatory networks in stem cells". It is also mentioned in 27 patent applications, several of which have to do with cancer biomarkers.
