= Gliogenesis =

Gliogenesis is the generation of non-neuronal glia populations derived from multipotent neural stem cells.

== Overview ==
Gliogenesis results in the formation of non-neuronal glia populations from neuronal cells. In this capacity, glial cells provide multiple functions to both the central nervous system (CNS) and the peripheral nervous system (PNS). Subsequent differentiation of glial cell populations results in function-specialized glial lineages. Glial cell-derived astrocytes are specialized lineages responsible for modulating the chemical environment by altering ion gradients and neurotransmitter transduction. Similarly derived, oligodendrocytes produce myelin, which insulates axons to facilitate electric signal transduction. Finally, microglial cells are derived from glial precursors and carry out macrophage-like properties to remove cellular and foreign debris within the central nervous system ref. Functions of glial-derived cell lineages are reviewed by Baumann and Hauw. Gliogenesis itself, and differentiation of glial-derived lineages are activated upon stimulation of specific signaling cascades. Similarly, inhibition of these pathways is controlled by distinct signaling cascades that control proliferation and differentiation. Thus, elaborate intracellular-mechanisms based on environmental signals are present to regulate the formation of these cells. As regulation is much more known in the CNS, its mechanisms and components will be focused on here. Understanding the mechanisms in which gliogenesis is regulated provides the potential to harness the ability to control the fate of glial cells and, consequently, the ability to reverse neurodegenerative diseases.

== Gliogenesis induction ==
Following the generation of neural stem cells, an option is presented to proceed to enter neurogenesis and form new neurons within the CNS, shift into gliogenesis, or remain in a pluripotent cell state. The mechanisms determining the ultimate fate of neural stem cells are conserved among both invertebrate and vertebrate species and are determined from extracellular cues generated from neighboring cells. Most work to derive such mechanisms, however, began with invertebrate models. Conclusions reached from these studies have directed attention to specific signaling molecules and effector pathways that are responsible for mediating the cellular events required for maintaining or changing the neural stem cell fate.

=== Signaling effectors ===
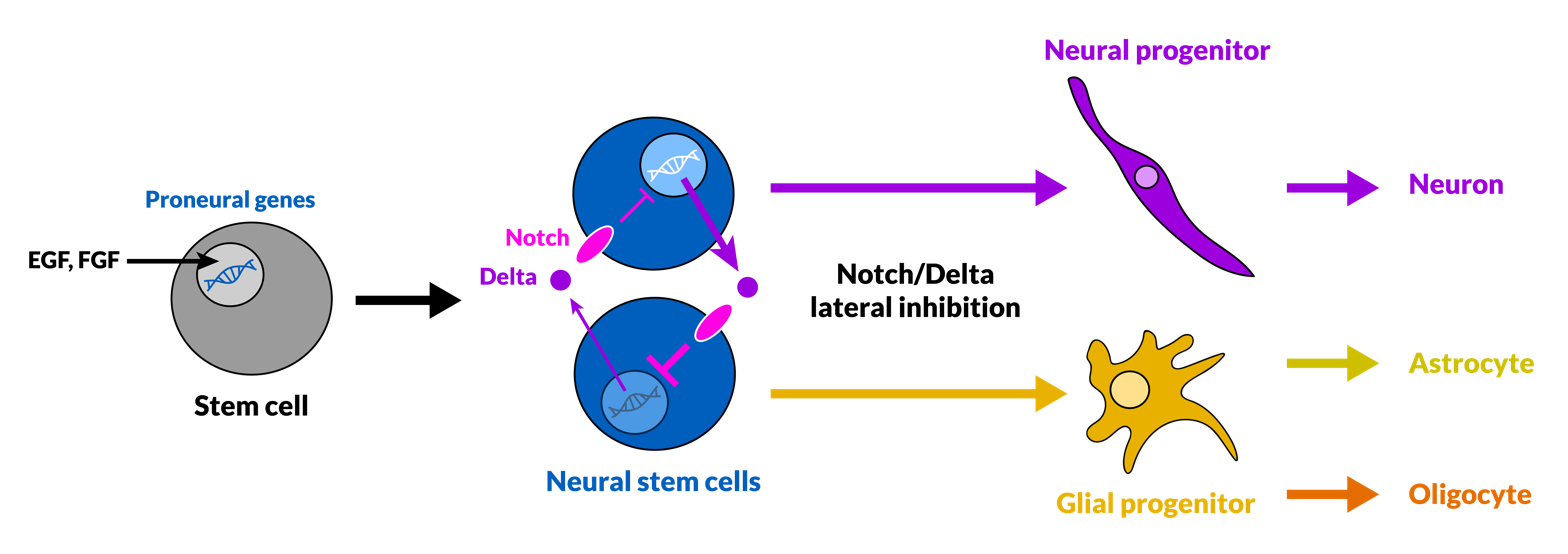
Stem cell differentiation and Notch-Delta lateral inhibition in neural stem cells, resulting in the generation of neuronal and glia progenitors.

Notch signaling is known to mediate prominent cellular events that result in gliogenesis. The Notch family proteins are transmembrane receptors that are ligand activated. In the presence of ligand effectors, the intracellular domain of the receptor is cleaved and sequestered to the nucleus where it acts to influence expression of transcription factors required for gliogenesis. Transcription factors synthesized as a result of the Notch signaling cascade bind to promoters of genes responsible for glial determination. Additionally, Notch signaling also acts to downregulate many genes responsible for neuronal development, thus inhibiting a neuron phenotype from arising. Both actions collectively function to promote glial fate.

In certain CNS tissue, JAK/STAT signaling is also known to promote gliogenesis Significant levels of the ciliary neurotrophic factor (CNTF) are expressed immediately preceding gliogensis in response to environmental cues allowing the activation of the JAK-STAT signaling pathway. Kinase activity phosphorylates STAT proteins which then are recruited by transcription factors. The STAT complex is targeted to promoters of genes responsible for gliogenesis activation. It is important to recognize that when isolated, receptor-mediated signaling cascades can produce distinct actions, however, when in vivo coopertivity often exists among receptor pathways and results in much more complicated cellular actions.

=== Signaling molecules ===
The receptor-proteins responsible for gliogenic pathways are often ligand activated. Upon binding of Delta or Jagged, the notch-mediated signaling cascades are activated leading to gliogenic transcription factor production as discussed above. As noted for receptor-proteins, in vivo interactions among different growth factor responsible for gliogenesis and other cell fates produce very different roles than when isolated.

== Gliogenesis regulation ==
To ensure proper temporal differentiation as well as correct quantities of glial cell formation, gliogenesis is subjected to stringent regulatory mechanisms. Proneural factors are expressed in high concentrations during times in which glial cells are not to form or neuron development is needed. These protein signals function to inhibit many of the signals utilized during the induction of gliogenesis. Additionally, the properties and abundance of receptor molecules that mediate gliogenesis are altered, consequently disrupting propagation of induction signals.

=== Signaling inhibition ===
During periods in which glial cell formation is discouraged, neural stem cells have the option to remain pluripotent or switch pathway lineages and begin forming neurons during neurogenesis. If neuron development is instructed, neurogenic factors, i.e. BMPs, are present to induce expression of proneural transcription factors like Neurogenin and ASCL1. These transcription factors function to interact with transcription factors generated from Notch signaling. Consequently, this complex is sequestered away from promoters activating gliogenesis and now directed to promoters that influence activity directed for neuron development. Neurogenin proteins regulate JAK/STAT signaling by similar mechanisms.

=== Receptor insensitivity ===
Recently, an alternative mechanism to regulate differentiation has been proposed in addition to inhibition through growth factors. Changes in local sensitivity of neural stem cells have been shown to modulate the differentiation capacity of growth factors. Over developmental time, neural stem cells lose the ability to respond to growth factors that influence differentiation as intrinsic changes occur to receptor structure and function of these cells. It has been shown Notch receptors require 50-fold higher concentrations of ligand effectors to initiate differentiation responses similar to that of developmentally earlier neural stem cells. Decrease in sensitivity of Notch receptors reduces the activity of Notch-signaling required for gliogenesis to occur. Consequently, neural stem cells have developed a general mechanism limiting further differentiation after intense specialization during the early developmental periods.

=== Receptor internalization ===
The internalization, or endocytosis, of receptor proteins from the cell’s plasma membrane contributes to yet another mode of regulation of cellular function. While receptor internalization has the potential to regulate cellular functions in both a positive and negative fashion, internalization of the Notch receptor is shown to down-regulate the events leading to gliogenesis as this process is Notch-signaling dependent

During repression of gliogenesis, expression of the Notch-binding protein, Numb, is elevated. Numb is suggested to function in two manners: 1) When expressed, Numb will interact with specific endocytic proteins and create a link between the notch receptor and the endocytic vesicles. The vesicle-receptor complex generated will be targeted back to the cell membrane and the membrane receptor will be recycled to the cell surface never reaching the nucleus. Alternatively, 2) Numb is suggested to recruit additional molecules other than endocytic proteins. In particular, ubiquitin ligases are shown to be recruited by Numb in mammals. The ubiquitin ligases ubiquitinates Notch and targets it for degradation Whatever the mechanism of Numb, the Notch receptor does not reach the nucleus and the transcription factors required for gliogenesis are not generated.

== Gliogenic-associated pathology ==
Recent work has demonstrated abnormalities in the signaling pathways responsible for gliogenesis and neurogenesis could contribute to the pathogenesis of neurodegenerative diseases and tumor development within the nervous system. Recognizing the distinct pathways controlling neural stem fate, as discussed above, provides one the opportunity to intervene in the pathogenesis of these diseases.

=== Gliogenesis and neurodegenerative disease ===
The pathology of neurodegenerative diseases is associated with the disruption of gliogenic pathways and has been recently reviewed. The subventricular zone (SVZ) of the forebrain is of special interest when evaluating errant gliogenic pathways as it is the largest store of neural stem cells in the brain. In multiple sclerosis (MS) patients, lesions in this area are frequently observed and often extend outward toward the lateral ventricles of the brain. Immune cells infiltrate the gliogenic regions within the SVZ adjacent to the lesions and initiate inflammatory response mechanisms in response to damage in this region. It is suggested that cytokine release during the inflammatory response reduces, foremost, the inherent neural stem cell populations, and jointly the potential of the remaining neural stem cell to differentiate to glial-fates. Consequently, a reduction of glial-derived oligodendrocytes, among others, compromise maintenance of myelin production for axon insulation, a hallmark phenotype among MS patients.

Consequences of gliogenesis disruption among other neurodegenerative diseases, such as Huntington's, Parkinson's, and Alzheimer's Diseases are currently being investigated and strong mechanistic evidence is shown for pathogenesis similar to MS.

=== Gliogenesis and glial tumors ===
Disruption of controlled glial generation subsequently results in tumorigenesis and glioma formation within the central nervous system. Loss of contact inhibition, cellular migration, and unregulated proliferation are characteristic of gliomas. Consistent with other tissues, these malignant phenotypes result most commonly from chromosome deletions, translocations, and point mutations. Linskey reviews both the genetic contributions and phenotypic observations of glioma

In non-carcinogenic neural stem cells, key regulatory mechanisms prevent uncontrolled gliogenic proliferation. However, such mechanisms are disrupted upon genetic damage. Studies now suggest glioma formation may result from cellular insensitivity to regulatory growth factors and cell signals, like neurogenin, that would normally inhibit further proliferation of glial cells. Conformational changes in receptor proteins are thought to occur, leaving the cell constitutively proliferating.

== Therapeutic intervention of gliogenic-derived pathogenesis ==
Understanding the pathology of these neurodegenerative diseases and establishment of therapeutic interventions require recognition of the processes of induction and inhibition of gliogenesis and the regulating mechanisms coordinating the intricate system established from both actions. Cell replacement strategies are now intensely studied as a possible therapeutic intervention of glial associated neurodegenerative disorders and glial tumors. Similar to any novel strategy, however, set-backs and liabilities accompany the promises this technique withholds. For cell replacement to function efficiently and demonstrate robust results, introduced cells must be 1) generated in sufficient yield and 2) immunocompatible with the host and 3) able to sustain self-growth. New perspectives within stem cell biology and gliogenesis regulation have provided new insights within the past decade to begin addressing these challenges. Reprogramming terminally differentiated neural lineages back to neural stem cells permits regeneration of a multipotent self-lineage that can be redirected to cellular-fates affected during neurogenerative diseases, oligodendrocytes with MS patients or astrocytes in those affected with Alzheimer's, in the presence of proper environmental signals.

It can be expected that as the signaling pathways discussed are shown as prominent regulators during glial cell generation, these same pathways will become therapeutic targets for glial-derived and other CNS cancers. In medulloblastomas, in vivo studies have begun targeting notch pathways by blocking Notch receptors with specific inhibitors preventing further differentiation. When used, pathway inhibitors provided 10-fold greater sensitivity to apoptotic induction in medulloblastoma cells Recognition of the regulatory mechanisms of gliogenesis provide new direction for intervention of neurogenic disorders.
