= Neurogenin-2 =

Protein-coding gene in the species Homo sapiens

NEUROG2

Identifiers
- Aliases: NEUROG2, Atoh4, Math4A, NGN2, bHLHa8, ngn-2, neurogenin 2
- External IDs: OMIM: 606624; MGI: 109619; GeneCards: NEUROG2

Gene location (Human)
Chr.	Chromosome 4 (human)
Band	4q25	Start	112,513,516 bp
Band	4q25	End	112,516,180 bp

Gene location (Mouse)
Chr.	Chromosome 3 (mouse)
Band	3|3 G2	Start	127,426,784 bp
Band	3|3 G2	End	127,429,280 bp
RNA expression pattern
Bgee	Human / Mouse (ortholog); Top expressed in: ganglionic eminence; ventricular zone; gonad; right hemisphere of cerebellum; putamen; amygdala; caudate nucleus; hippocampus proper; prefrontal cortex; anterior cingulate cortex / Top expressed in: ventricular zone; rhombic lip; fossa; urethra; ganglion of neuraxis; ganglionic eminence; pretectal area; neural crest; condyle; zona limitans intrathalamica; More reference expression data
BioGPS	n/a
Gene ontology
Molecular function	DNA binding; E-box binding; protein dimerization activity; DNA-binding transcription factor activity, RNA polymerase II-specific
Cellular component	nucleus
Biological process	multicellular organism development; nervous system development; regulation of transcription, DNA-templated; positive regulation of DNA-binding transcription factor activity; neuron differentiation; cell differentiation; transcription, DNA-templated; regulation of transcription by RNA polymerase II
Sources:Amigo / QuickGO
Orthologs
Databases	NCBI: entry; OMA: entry
Species	Human	Mouse
Entrez	63973	11924
Ensembl	ENSG00000178403	ENSMUSG00000027967
UniProt	Q9H2A3	P70447
RefSeq (mRNA)	NM_024019	NM_009718
RefSeq (protein)	NP_076924	NP_033848
Location (UCSC)	Chr 4: 112.51 – 112.52 Mb	Chr 3: 127.43 – 127.43 Mb
PubMed search
- Wikidata
View/Edit Human	View/Edit Mouse

Neurogenin-2 is a protein that in humans is encoded by the NEUROG2 gene.

Neurogenin-2 is a member of the neurogenin subfamily of basic helix-loop-helix (bHLH) transcription factor genes that play an important role in neurogenesis.

It has been found to reprogram astrocytes into glutamatergic neurons when expressed.
