= NEUROD1 =

Protein-coding gene in the species Homo sapiens

Identifiers
- Aliases: NEUROD1, BETA2, BHF-1, MODY6, NEUROD, bHLHa3, neuronal differentiation 1, T2D
- External IDs: OMIM: 601724; MGI: 1339708; GeneCards: NEUROD1
Available structures
| PDB | Ortholog search: PDBe RCSB |
| PDB | List of PDB id codes 2QL2 |

Gene location (Human)
| Chr. | Chromosome 2 (human) |
| Band | 2q31.3 | Start | 181,668,295 bp |
| Band | 2q31.3 | End | 181,680,827 bp |

Gene location (Mouse)
| Chr. | Chromosome 2 (mouse) |
| Band | 2 C3|2 47.58 cM | Start | 79,282,865 bp |
| Band | 2 C3|2 47.58 cM | End | 79,287,095 bp |
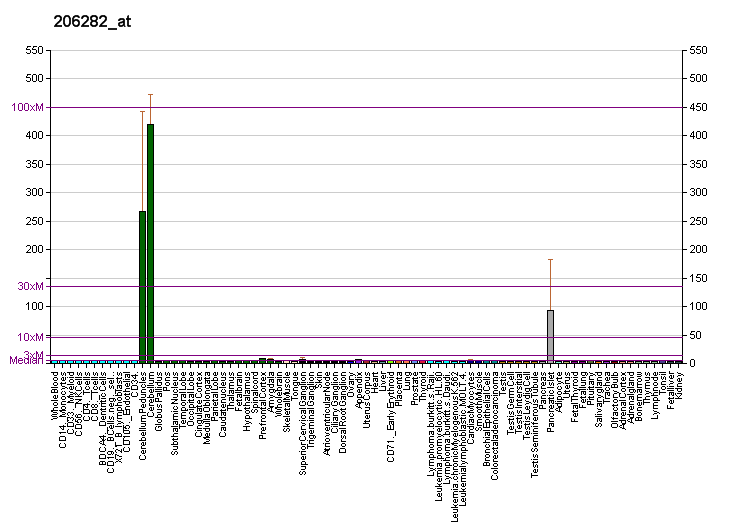
RNA expression pattern
| Bgee | Human / Mouse (ortholog); Top expressed in: paraflocculus of cerebellum; cerebellar vermis; right hemisphere of cerebellum; islet of Langerhans; ganglionic eminence; pons; testicle; beta cell; middle temporal gyrus; Brodmann area 10 / Top expressed in: lobe of cerebellum; cerebellar vermis; habenula; pineal gland; neural layer of retina; islet of Langerhans; retinal pigment epithelium; epithelium of lens; deep cerebellar nuclei; trigeminal ganglion; More reference expression data |
| BioGPS | More reference expression data |
Gene ontology
| Molecular function | sequence-specific DNA binding; transcription coactivator activity; DNA binding; protein dimerization activity; DNA-binding transcription factor activity; DNA-binding transcription activator activity, RNA polymerase II-specific; transcription factor binding; chromatin binding; RNA polymerase II cis-regulatory region sequence-specific DNA binding; E-box binding; protein binding; protein heterodimerization activity; double-stranded DNA binding; DNA-binding transcription factor activity, RNA polymerase II-specific |
| Cellular component | cytoplasm; intracellular anatomical structure; nucleoplasm; RNA polymerase II transcription regulator complex; nucleus |
| Biological process | positive regulation of transcription regulatory region DNA binding; regulation of neuron differentiation; neurogenesis; cell differentiation; cell fate commitment; regulation of transcription, DNA-templated; pancreatic PP cell fate commitment; glucose homeostasis; regulation of insulin secretion; enteroendocrine cell differentiation; dentate gyrus development; signal transduction involved in regulation of gene expression; neuron development; insulin secretion; positive regulation of DNA-binding transcription factor activity; response to glucose; transcription by RNA polymerase II; embryonic organ morphogenesis; cerebellum development; transcription, DNA-templated; nervous system development; positive regulation of transcription, DNA-templated; multicellular organism development; hindbrain development; nucleocytoplasmic transport; positive regulation of neuron differentiation; positive regulation of cell differentiation; nitric oxide mediated signal transduction; positive regulation of apoptotic process; regulation of intestinal epithelial structure maintenance; inner ear development; camera-type eye development; pancreatic A cell fate commitment; amacrine cell differentiation; negative regulation of type B pancreatic cell apoptotic process; cellular response to glucose stimulus; anterior/posterior pattern specification; endocrine pancreas development; positive regulation of transcription by RNA polymerase II; negative regulation of receptor signaling pathway via JAK-STAT |
Sources:Amigo / QuickGO
Orthologs
| Databases | NCBI: entry; OMA: entry |
| Species | Human | Mouse |
| Entrez | 4760 | 18012 |
| Ensembl | ENSG00000162992 | ENSMUSG00000034701 |
| UniProt | Q13562 | Q60867 |
| RefSeq (mRNA) | NM_002500 | NM_010894 |
| RefSeq (protein) | NP_002491 | NP_035024 |
| Location (UCSC) | Chr 2: 181.67 – 181.68 Mb | Chr 2: 79.28 – 79.29 Mb |
| PubMed search |
- Wikidata
| View/Edit Human | View/Edit Mouse |

Neurogenic differentiation 1 (Neurod1), also called β2, is a transcription factor of the NeuroD-type. It is encoded by the human gene NEUROD1.

In mice, Neurod1 expression is first seen at embryonic day 12 (E12).

It is a member of the Neurod family of basic helix-loop-helix (bHLH) transcription factors, composed of Neurod1, Neurod2, Neurod4, and Neurod6. The protein forms heterodimers with other bHLH proteins and activates transcription of genes that contain a specific DNA sequence known as the E-box. It regulates expression of the insulin gene, and mutations in this gene result in type II diabetes mellitus in mouse models and in human clinical patients.

Neurod1 is found to convert reactive glial cells into functional neurons in the mouse brain in vivo In the adult cortex, Neurod1 expression is a marker of mature excitatory pyramidal neurons in the upper-most layers of the cortex.

== Interactions ==
Neurod1 has been shown to interact with MAP3K10, MAFA and Cyclin D1.
