= Achaete-scute complex =

Drosophila melanogaster genes

Achaete-scute-related

Identifiers
- Symbol: MASH1/Ascl1a-like
- InterPro: IPR015660

Achaete-scute complex protein T5

Identifiers
- Organism: Drosophila melanogaster
- Symbol: ac
- UniProt: P10083
Search for
- Structures: Swiss-model
- Domains: InterPro

Achaete-scute complex protein T4

Identifiers
- Organism: Drosophila melanogaster
- Symbol: sc
- UniProt: P10084
Search for
- Structures: Swiss-model
- Domains: InterPro

Achaete-scute complex protein T3

Identifiers
- Organism: Drosophila melanogaster
- Symbol: l(1)sc
- UniProt: P09774
Search for
- Structures: Swiss-model
- Domains: InterPro

Achaete-scute complex protein T8

Identifiers
- Organism: Drosophila melanogaster
- Symbol: ase
- UniProt: P09775
Search for
- Structures: Swiss-model
- Domains: InterPro

The achaete-scute complex (AS-C) is a group of four genes (achaete, scute, lethal of scute, and asense) in the fruit fly Drosophila melanogaster. These genes encode basic helix-loop-helix transcription factors that have been best studied in their regulation of nervous system development. Because of their role in specifying neuroblast fate, the genes of the AS-C are called proneural genes. However, the AS-C has non-proneural functions, such as specifying muscle and gut progenitors. Homologues of AS-C in other animals, including humans and other vertebrates, have similar functions.

Genes of the AS-C interact with the Notch pathway in both their proneural functions as well as their specification of gut and muscle cells.

== Genetic structure ==
The complex is found near the tip of the X chromosome, just 3' of yellow, in chromosome bands 1A6 through 1B3. It occupies around 93 kb of the genome, with all four genes oriented in the same direction.

=== achaete ===
The 5′-most gene of the achaete-scute complex, achaete (short form ac), is a small gene of less than 1000 bp. The Achaete protein is 201 amino acids long and has a relative size of 23 kDa. As with most classically described Drosophila genes, achaete is named for its mutant phenotype, which is the lack of sensory hairs (macrochaetae and microchaetae) on the back of the adult fly. Achaete functions to specify sensory hair cell fate. It functions downstream of other genes, including hairy and extramacrochaete, that set up fields of cells that may express achaete.

=== scute ===
Scute (short form sc) is found in about 25 kb (3)′ of achaete. It is a 1.45 kb gene encoding a 345 aa protein of 38.2 kDa.

=== lethal or scute ===
lethal or scute (short form l(1)sc) is found about 12 kb 3′ of scute. It is a 1.1 kb gene encoding a 257 aa protein of 29 kDa.

=== asense ===
asense (short form ase) found 45 kb 3′ of l(1)sc. It is a 2.8 kb gene encoding a 486 aa protein of 53.2 kDa.

== See also ==
- ASCL1 :- Achaete-scute homolog 1
- ASCL2 :- Achaete-scute homolog 2
