= Hairless =

Drosophila gene

Identifiers
- Organism: Drosophila melanogaster
- Symbol: H
- UniProt: Q02308
Search for
- Structures: Swiss-model
- Domains: InterPro

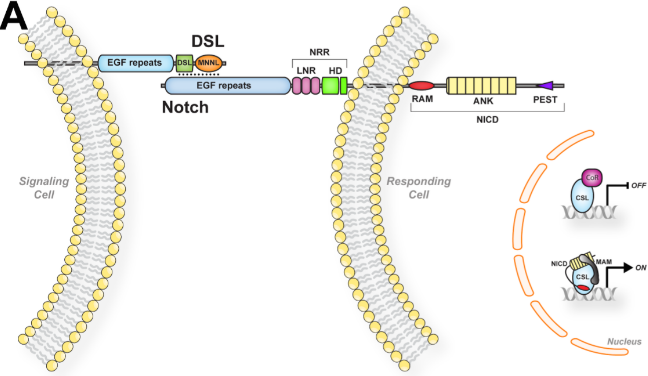
Figure 1. Diagram of Notch Signaling Pathway for Hairless Gene in Drosophila

Hairless, also known as H, is a well-characterized Drosophila gene. Since Hairless is a dominant loss of function mutation, many mutations to Hairless are embryonic lethal, but there are several viable hairless mutants. This specific Drosophila gene is involved in the Notch signaling pathway (NSP) by acting as a suppressor of the organism's Notch signaling. This interaction of the NSP can be seen in Figure 1.

Hairless (H) encodes a hydrophilic protein that is composed of 1076 amino acids, and has a molecular weight of 110 kDa. The H protein is reported in insects, and is found in nearly all of the family Drosophilidae. It is also found in the family Culicidae, as well as the orders Lepidoptera, Hymenoptera, and Coleoptera.

In Drosophila, NSPs allow for communication intercellularly during embryo development, and the physiological activities of adult organisms. Furthermore, these pathways turn on periodically during devolvement to help determine cell fate functions of the cell. Since Hairless (H) is an antagonist of the NSP, as well as a “key member of the Su[H] repressor complex", it plays a significant part of embryo development in insects because it helps influence cell fate decisions during this time.

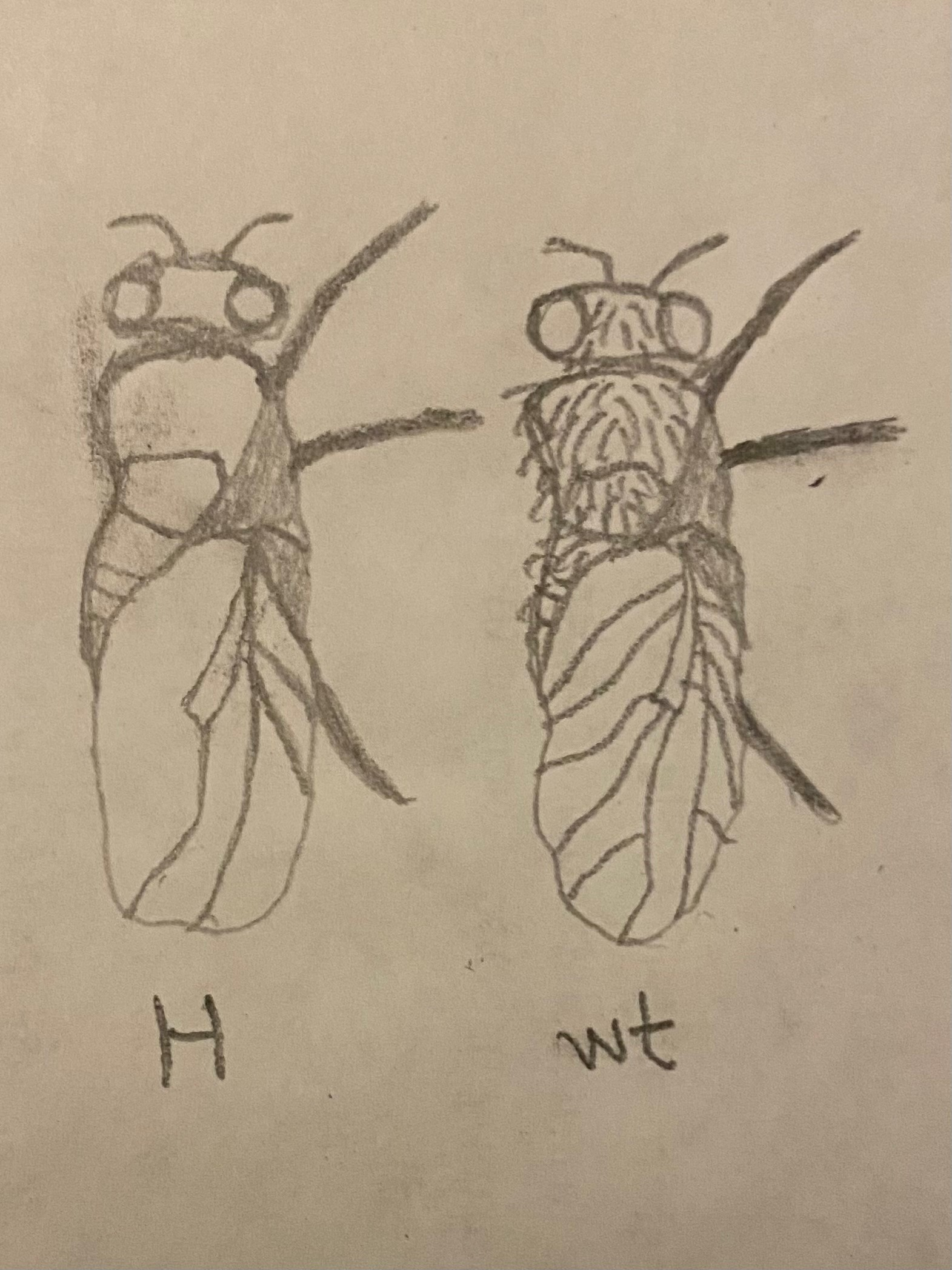
Figure 2. Hand-drawn Image Showing the Differing Phenotypes Between the Wild Type ("wt") and Hairless ("H") Drosophila.

It is crucial that proteins HP120 and HP150 are present in the organism as they control the normal activity of H. This activity regulation also controls NSP, which allows the fly embryos to develop correctly, and if there is any fluctuation in the pathway or the proteins, it can change the outcome of the offspring. The two most common changes in the Drosophila phenotype as a result of Hairless mutation are bristle loss and vein gaps. These changes can be seen in Figure 2.
