= ISL1 =

Protein-coding gene in the species Homo sapiens

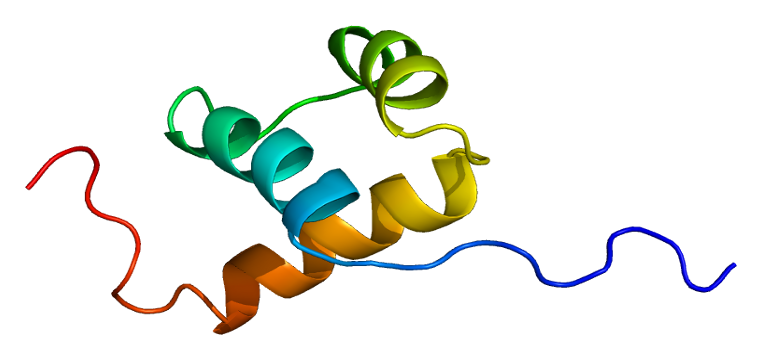

Identifiers
- Aliases: ISL1, ISLET1, Isl-1, ISL LIM homeobox 1
- External IDs: OMIM: 600366; MGI: 101791; GeneCards: ISL1
Available structures
PDB	Ortholog search: PDBe RCSB
PDB	List of PDB id codes 2RGT, 4JCJ

Gene location (Human)
Chr.	Chromosome 5 (human)
Band	5q11.1	Start	51,383,448 bp
Band	5q11.1	End	51,394,730 bp

Gene location (Mouse)
Chr.	Chromosome 13 (mouse)
Band	13|13 D2.2	Start	116,434,817 bp
Band	13|13 D2.2	End	116,446,225 bp
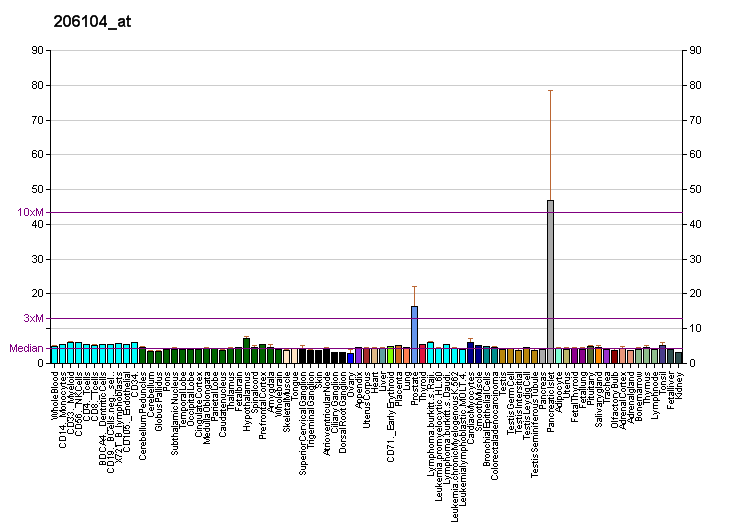
RNA expression pattern
Bgee	Human / Mouse (ortholog); Top expressed in: secondary oocyte; islet of Langerhans; human penis; urethra; pylorus; cardia; sperm; buccal mucosa cell; pancreatic ductal cell; gastric mucosa / Top expressed in: superior cervical ganglion; genital tubercle; trigeminal ganglion; lumbar spinal ganglion; medial ganglionic eminence; islet of Langerhans; neural layer of retina; facial motor nucleus; vestibular sensory epithelium; median eminence; More reference expression data
BioGPS	More reference expression data
Gene ontology
Molecular function	DNA binding; transcription coactivator activity; sequence-specific DNA binding; DNA-binding transcription activator activity, RNA polymerase II-specific; chromatin binding; metal ion binding; RNA polymerase II cis-regulatory region sequence-specific DNA binding; bHLH transcription factor binding; protein binding; nuclear receptor binding; cis-regulatory region sequence-specific DNA binding; estrogen receptor binding; promoter-specific chromatin binding; DNA-binding transcription factor activity, RNA polymerase II-specific
Cellular component	cytoplasm; nucleoplasm; nucleus
Biological process	negative regulation of neuron apoptotic process; peripheral nervous system neuron development; positive regulation of interleukin-1 alpha production; pituitary gland development; regulation of transcription, DNA-templated; negative regulation of neuron differentiation; positive regulation of interleukin-12 production; axon regeneration; spinal cord motor neuron cell fate specification; trigeminal nerve development; neuron fate specification; outflow tract morphogenesis; positive regulation of interferon-gamma production; positive regulation of granulocyte colony-stimulating factor production; heart morphogenesis; negative regulation of transcription by RNA polymerase II; transcription by RNA polymerase II; positive regulation of angiogenesis; positive regulation of histone acetylation; outflow tract septum morphogenesis; endocardial cushion morphogenesis; ventricular cardiac muscle tissue morphogenesis; atrial septum morphogenesis; multicellular organism development; cardiac cell fate determination; regulation of secondary heart field cardioblast proliferation; cardiac muscle cell myoblast differentiation; cellular response to glucocorticoid stimulus; visceral motor neuron differentiation; mesenchymal cell differentiation; positive regulation of granulocyte macrophage colony-stimulating factor production; neural crest cell migration; neuron differentiation; positive regulation of cell population proliferation; positive regulation of interleukin-1 beta production; positive regulation of interleukin-6 production; positive regulation of tumor necrosis factor production; regulation of gene expression; pancreas development; positive regulation of macrophage colony-stimulating factor production; positive regulation of vascular endothelial growth factor production; negative regulation of protein homodimerization activity; positive regulation of DNA binding; peripheral nervous system neuron axonogenesis; spinal cord motor neuron differentiation; neuron fate commitment; secondary heart field specification; innervation; negative regulation of intracellular estrogen receptor signaling pathway; negative regulation of inflammatory response; cardiac right ventricle morphogenesis; negative regulation of canonical Wnt signaling pathway; positive regulation of insulin secretion; sensory system development; pharyngeal system development; retinal ganglion cell axon guidance; positive regulation of transcription by RNA polymerase II; positive regulation of cell differentiation; transcription, DNA-templated; cell differentiation; positive regulation of tyrosine phosphorylation of STAT protein; positive regulation of epithelial to mesenchymal transition; negative regulation of epithelial cell proliferation; development of the heart; axonogenesis
Sources:Amigo / QuickGO
Orthologs
Databases	NCBI: entry; OMA: entry
Species	Human	Mouse
Entrez	3670	16392
Ensembl	ENSG00000016082	ENSMUSG00000042258
UniProt	P61371	P61372
RefSeq (mRNA)	NM_002202	NM_021459
RefSeq (protein)	NP_002193	NP_067434
Location (UCSC)	Chr 5: 51.38 – 51.39 Mb	Chr 13: 116.43 – 116.45 Mb
PubMed search
- Wikidata
View/Edit Human	View/Edit Mouse

Insulin gene enhancer protein ISL-1 is a protein that in humans is encoded by the ISL1 gene.

== Function ==
This gene encodes a transcription factor containing two N-terminal LIM domains and one C-terminal homeodomain. The encoded protein plays an important role in the embryogenesis of pancreatic islets of Langerhans. In mouse embryos, a deficiency of this gene results in failure to undergo neural tube motor neuron differentiation.

== Interactions ==
ISL1 has been shown to interact with Estrogen receptor alpha.

== Role in cardiac development ==
ISL1 is a marker for cardiac progenitors of the secondary heart field (SHF) which includes the right ventricle and the outflow tract. The biological function of ISL1 is demonstrated through ISL1 mutant mice and chick embryos that have altered cell proliferation, survival, and migration of cardiogenic precursors and severe cardiac defects. More recently it has been defined as a marker for a cardiac progenitor cell lineage that is capable of differentiating into all 3 major cell types of the heart: cardiomyocytes, smooth muscle and endothelial cell lineages. Research has shown that ISL1 promotes differentiation of cardiac cells and a depletion of ISL1 can respecify the cell fate of nascent cardiomyocytes, such as from ventricular to an atrial identity.

The validity of ISL1 as a marker for cardiac progenitor cells has been questioned since some groups have found no evidence that ISL1 cells serve as cardiac progenitors. Furthermore, ISL1 is not restricted to second heart field progenitors in the developing heart, but also labels cardiac neural crest. This paper supports work from the Vilquin group in 2011, which concluded that ISL1 can represent cells from both neural crest and cardiomyocyte lineages. While it has been demonstrated by multiple groups that ISL1-positive cells can indeed differentiate into all 3 major cell types of the heart, their clinical relevance has been seriously questioned.
