= NEUROD2 =

Protein-coding gene in the species Homo sapiens

Identifiers
- Aliases: NEUROD2, NDRF, bHLHa1, neuronal differentiation 2, EIEE72, DEE72
- External IDs: OMIM: 601725; MGI: 107755; GeneCards: NEUROD2

Gene location (Human)
Chr.	Chromosome 17 (human)
Band	17q12	Start	39,603,536 bp
Band	17q12	End	39,609,777 bp

Gene location (Mouse)
Chr.	Chromosome 11 (mouse)
Band	11 D|11 61.75 cM	Start	98,216,241 bp
Band	11 D|11 61.75 cM	End	98,220,474 bp
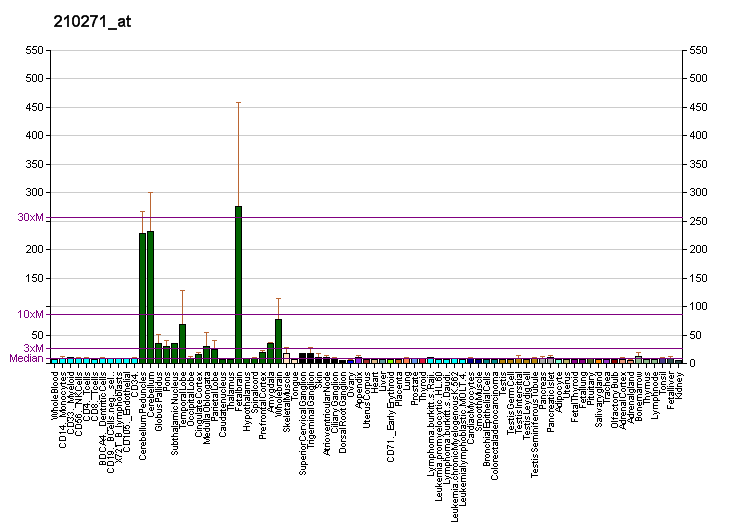
RNA expression pattern
Bgee	Human / Mouse (ortholog); Top expressed in: ganglionic eminence; right hemisphere of cerebellum; right frontal lobe; cingulate gyrus; anterior cingulate cortex; Brodmann area 9; paraflocculus of cerebellum; hippocampus proper; prefrontal cortex; superior frontal gyrus / Top expressed in: CA3 field; primary visual cortex; perirhinal cortex; entorhinal cortex; dentate gyrus of hippocampal formation granule cell; cerebellar cortex; ventricular zone; superior frontal gyrus; Region I of hippocampus proper; hippocampus proper; More reference expression data
BioGPS	More reference expression data
Gene ontology
Molecular function	DNA binding; RNA polymerase II transcription regulatory region sequence-specific DNA binding; protein dimerization activity; transcription corepressor activity; DNA-binding transcription factor activity; DNA-binding transcription activator activity, RNA polymerase II-specific; E-box binding; protein heterodimerization activity; DNA-binding transcription factor activity, RNA polymerase II-specific
Cellular component	nucleus
Biological process	cellular response to calcium ion; regulation of neuron differentiation; cell differentiation; negative regulation of nucleic acid-templated transcription; positive regulation of calcium-mediated signaling; associative learning; regulation of transcription, DNA-templated; regulation of transcription by RNA polymerase II; positive regulation of DNA-binding transcription factor activity; neuron development; transcription by RNA polymerase II; behavioral fear response; transcription, DNA-templated; nervous system development; positive regulation of synaptic plasticity; negative regulation of synapse maturation; multicellular organism development; positive regulation of synapse maturation; protein ubiquitination; positive regulation of neuron differentiation; cerebellar cortex development; regulation of synapse maturation; positive regulation of transcription by RNA polymerase II; cellular response to electrical stimulus
Sources:Amigo / QuickGO
Orthologs
Databases	NCBI: entry; OMA: entry
Species	Human	Mouse
Entrez	4761	18013
Ensembl	ENSG00000171532	ENSMUSG00000038255
UniProt	Q15784	Q62414
RefSeq (mRNA)	NM_006160	NM_010895
RefSeq (protein)	NP_006151	NP_035025
Location (UCSC)	Chr 17: 39.6 – 39.61 Mb	Chr 11: 98.22 – 98.22 Mb
PubMed search
- Wikidata
View/Edit Human	View/Edit Mouse

Neurogenic differentiation factor 2 is a protein that in humans is encoded by the NEUROD2 gene.

== Function ==
This gene encodes a member of the neuroD family of neurogenic basic helix-loop-helix (bHLH) proteins. Expression of this gene can induce transcription from neuron-specific promoters, such as the GAP-43 promoter, which contain a specific DNA sequence known as an E-box. The product of the human gene can induce neurogenic differentiation in non-neuronal cells in Xenopus embryos, and is thought to play a role in the determination and maintenance of neuronal cell fates.

== Interactions ==
NEUROD2 has been shown to interact with Protein kinase N1.
