= ASCL1 =

Protein-coding gene in humans

Identifiers
- Aliases: ASCL1, ASH1, HASH1, MASH1, bHLHa46, achaete-scute family bHLH transcription factor 1
- External IDs: OMIM: 100790; MGI: 96919; GeneCards: ASCL1

Gene location (Human)
Chr.	Chromosome 12 (human)
Band	12q23.2	Start	102,957,674 bp
Band	12q23.2	End	102,960,513 bp

Gene location (Mouse)
Chr.	Chromosome 10 (mouse)
Band	10|10 C1	Start	87,326,681 bp
Band	10|10 C1	End	87,329,522 bp
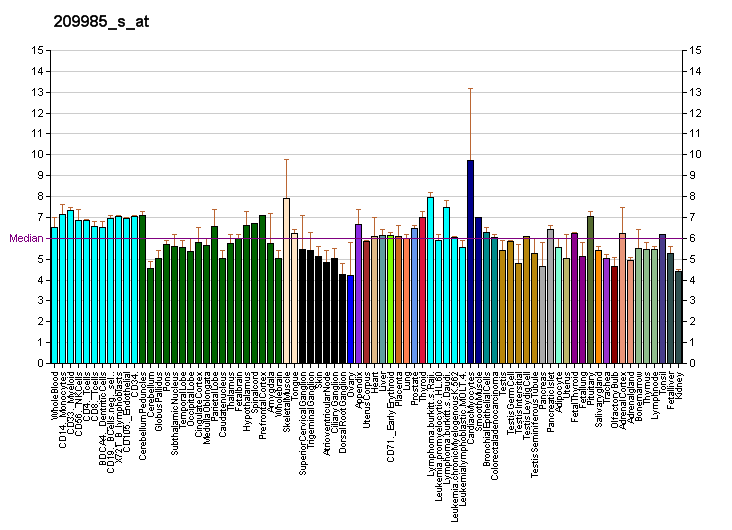

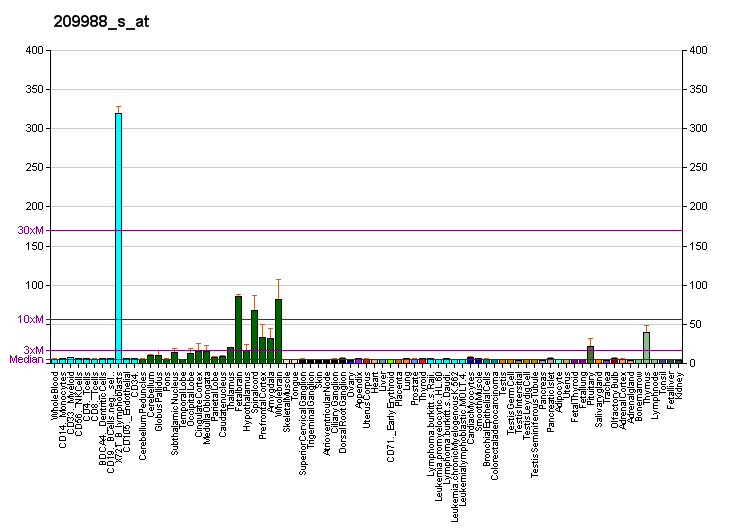

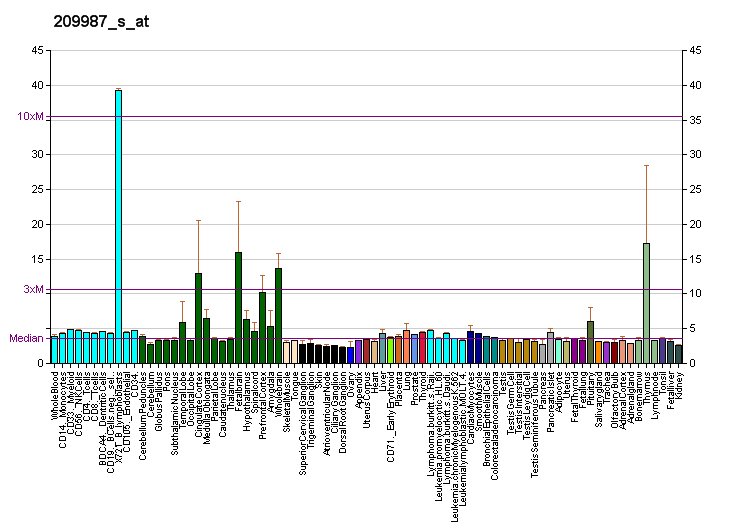
RNA expression pattern
Bgee	Human / Mouse (ortholog); Top expressed in: ganglionic eminence; ventricular zone; Region I of hippocampus proper; entorhinal cortex; external globus pallidus; primary visual cortex; amygdala; postcentral gyrus; ventral tegmental area; pituitary gland / Top expressed in: medial ganglionic eminence; rhombic lip; ventricular zone; pituitary gland; Rostral migratory stream; pelvic ganglion; enteric nervous system; female urethra; anterior pituitary; male urethra; More reference expression data
BioGPS	More reference expression data
Gene ontology
Molecular function	DNA binding; sequence-specific DNA binding; protein dimerization activity; protein homodimerization activity; DNA-binding transcription factor activity; chromatin binding; RNA polymerase II cis-regulatory region sequence-specific DNA binding; DNA-binding transcription repressor activity, RNA polymerase II-specific; bHLH transcription factor binding; E-box binding; protein binding; double-stranded DNA binding; DNA-binding transcription factor activity, RNA polymerase II-specific; RNA polymerase II transcription regulatory region sequence-specific DNA binding; transcription factor binding
Cellular component	soma; nucleus; RNA polymerase II transcription regulator complex
Biological process	Notch signaling pathway; commitment of neuronal cell to specific neuron type in forebrain; sympathetic ganglion development; pattern specification process; noradrenergic neuron development; cerebral cortex GABAergic interneuron differentiation; neurogenesis; cell differentiation; stomach neuroendocrine cell differentiation; regulation of transcription, DNA-templated; negative regulation of neuron differentiation; response to retinoic acid; spinal cord association neuron differentiation; sympathetic nervous system development; neuroblast fate determination; regulation of transcription by RNA polymerase II; spinal cord oligodendrocyte cell fate specification; musculoskeletal movement, spinal reflex action; negative regulation of apoptotic process; neuron migration; glial cell differentiation; negative regulation of transcription by RNA polymerase II; cell maturation; cellular response to magnetism; oligodendrocyte differentiation; olfactory pit development; transcription, DNA-templated; lung neuroendocrine cell differentiation; nervous system development; generation of neurons; response to lithium ion; multicellular organism development; positive regulation of neural precursor cell proliferation; adrenal chromaffin cell differentiation; positive regulation of neurogenesis; positive regulation of neuron apoptotic process; ventral spinal cord interneuron fate commitment; central nervous system neuron development; positive regulation of cell cycle; response to epidermal growth factor; regulation of cell population proliferation; vestibular nucleus development; positive regulation of neuron differentiation; regulation of mitotic cell cycle; forebrain neuron differentiation; cerebral cortex development; regulation of gene expression; neuroblast proliferation; subpallium neuron fate commitment; regulation of timing of subpallium neuron differentiation; oligodendrocyte development; lung epithelial cell differentiation; carotid body glomus cell differentiation; response to folic acid; spinal cord oligodendrocyte cell differentiation; regulation of epithelial cell differentiation; negative regulation of transcription, DNA-templated; noradrenergic neuron fate commitment; regulation of Notch signaling pathway; regulation of neurogenesis; positive regulation of Notch signaling pathway; positive regulation of transcription by RNA polymerase II; oligodendrocyte cell fate commitment; neuron differentiation; neuron fate commitment; neuron fate specification; neuron development; development of the heart; sensory organ development
Sources:Amigo / QuickGO
Orthologs
Databases	NCBI: entry; OMA: entry
Species	Human	Mouse
Entrez	429	17172
Ensembl	ENSG00000139352	ENSMUSG00000020052
UniProt	P50553	Q02067
RefSeq (mRNA)	NM_004316	NM_008553
RefSeq (protein)	NP_004307	NP_032579
Location (UCSC)	Chr 12: 102.96 – 102.96 Mb	Chr 10: 87.33 – 87.33 Mb
PubMed search
- Wikidata
View/Edit Human	View/Edit Mouse

Achaete-scute homolog 1 is a protein that in humans is encoded by the ASCL1 gene. Because it was discovered subsequent to studies on its homolog in Drosophila, the Achaete-scute complex, it was originally named MASH-1 for mammalian achaete scute homolog-1.

== Function ==
This gene encodes a member of the basic helix-loop-helix (BHLH) family of transcription factors. The protein activates transcription by binding to the E box (5'-CANNTG-3'). Dimerization with other BHLH proteins is required for efficient DNA binding. This protein plays a role in the neuronal commitment and differentiation and in the generation of olfactory and autonomic neurons. It is highly expressed in medullary thyroid cancer and small cell lung cancer and may be a useful marker for these cancers. The presence of a CAG repeat in the gene suggests that it may also play a role in tumor formation.

== Role in neuronal commitment ==
Development of the vertebrate nervous system begins when the neural tube forms in the early embryo. The neural tube eventually gives rise to the entire nervous system, but first neuroblasts must differentiate from the neuroepithelium of the tube. The neuroblasts are the cells that undergo mitotic division and produce neurons. Asc is central to the differentiation of the neuroblasts and the lateral inhibition mechanism which inherently creates a safety net in the event of damage or death in these incredibly important cells.

Differentiation of the neuroblast begins when the cells of the neural tube express Asc and thus upregulate the expression of Delta, a protein essential to the lateral inhibition pathway of neuronal commitment. Delta, a membrane-bound protein, can then bind to the Notch receptor of neighbouring cells, which upon activation undergoes proteolytic cleavage to release the intracellular domain (Notch-ICD). The Notch-ICD is then free to travel to the nucleus and form a complex with Suppressor of Hairless (SuH) and Mastermind. This complex, by inducing the transcription of HES1, a transcriptional repressor, then represses the transcription of Asc and accomplishes two important tasks. First, it prevents the expression of factors required for differentiation of the cell into a neuroblast. Secondly, it inhibits the neighboring cell's production of Delta. Therefore, the future neuroblast will be the cell that has the greatest Asc activation in the vicinity and consequently the greatest Delta production that will inhibit the differentiation of neighboring cells. The select group of neuroblasts that then differentiate in the neural tube are thus replaceable because the neuroblast's ability to suppress differentiation of neighboring cells depends on its own ability to produce Asc. This process of neuroblast differentiation via Asc is common to all animals. Although this mechanism was initially studied in Drosophila, homologs to all proteins in the pathway have been found in vertebrates that have the same bHLH structure.

== Autonomic nervous system development ==
In addition to its important role in neuroblast formation, Asc also functions to mediate autonomic nervous system (ANS) formation. Asc was initially suspected to play a role in the ANS when ASCL1 was found expressed in cells surrounding the dorsal aorta, the adrenal glands and in the developing sympathetic chain during a specific stage of development. Subsequent studies of mice genetically altered to be MASH-1 deficient revealed defective development of both sympathetic and parasympathetic ganglia, the two constituents of the ANS.

== Interactions ==
ASCL1 has been shown to interact with Myocyte-specific enhancer factor 2A.
