= PAX4 =

Protein-coding gene in humans

Identifiers
- Aliases: PAX4, KPD, MODY9, paired box 4
- External IDs: OMIM: 167413; MGI: 97488; GeneCards: PAX4

Gene location (Human)
Chr.	Chromosome 7 (human)
Band	7q32.1	Start	127,610,292 bp
Band	7q32.1	End	127,618,142 bp

Gene location (Mouse)
Chr.	Chromosome 6 (mouse)
Band	6 A3.3|6 11.99 cM	Start	28,442,333 bp
Band	6 A3.3|6 11.99 cM	End	28,449,352 bp
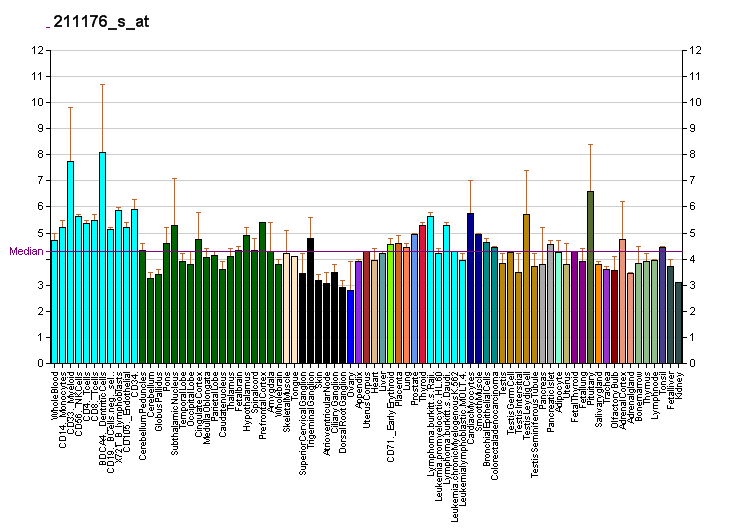

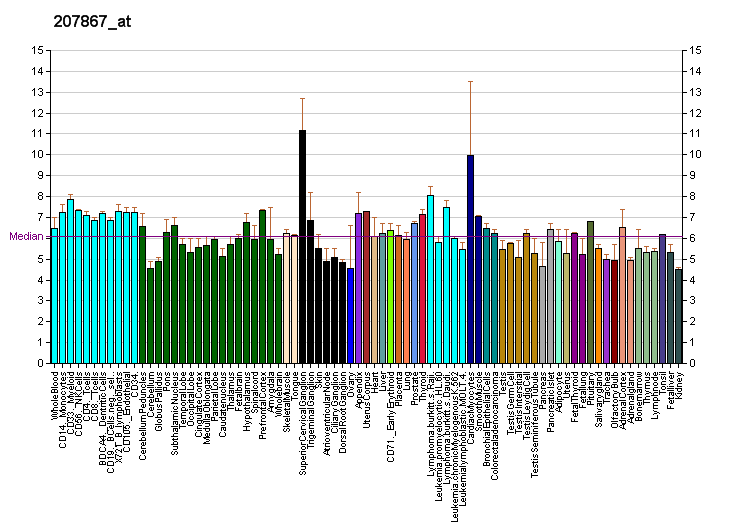
RNA expression pattern
Bgee	Human / Mouse (ortholog); Top expressed in: testicle; rectum; mucosa of transverse colon; duodenum; tibialis anterior muscle; deltoid muscle; islet of Langerhans; developmental structure; embryo; ganglionic eminence / Top expressed in: entorhinal cortex; CA3 field; perirhinal cortex; embryo; embryo; medulla oblongata; inner muscle layer; ureter; lens; duodenum; More reference expression data
BioGPS	More reference expression data
Gene ontology
Molecular function	RNA polymerase II cis-regulatory region sequence-specific DNA binding; DNA binding; sequence-specific DNA binding; DNA-binding transcription repressor activity, RNA polymerase II-specific; double-stranded DNA binding; DNA-binding transcription factor activity, RNA polymerase II-specific; protein binding
Cellular component	nucleoplasm; nucleus
Biological process	cell differentiation; regulation of transcription, DNA-templated; negative regulation of apoptotic process; negative regulation of transcription by RNA polymerase II; transcription, DNA-templated; multicellular organism development; retina development in camera-type eye; circadian rhythm; positive regulation of cell differentiation; animal organ morphogenesis; regulation of cell differentiation; response to cAMP; negative regulation of transcription, DNA-templated; endocrine pancreas development; pancreas development
Sources:Amigo / QuickGO
Orthologs
Databases	NCBI: entry; OMA: entry
Species	Human	Mouse
Entrez	5078	18506
Ensembl	ENSG00000106331	ENSMUSG00000029706
UniProt	O43316; Q3KNR5	P32115
RefSeq (mRNA)	NM_006193; NM_001366110; NM_001366111	NM_001159925; NM_001159926; NM_011038
RefSeq (protein)	NP_006184; NP_001353039; NP_001353040	NP_001153397; NP_001153398; NP_035168
Location (UCSC)	Chr 7: 127.61 – 127.62 Mb	Chr 6: 28.44 – 28.45 Mb
PubMed search
- Wikidata
View/Edit Human	View/Edit Mouse

Paired box gene 4, also known as PAX4, is a protein which in humans is encoded by the PAX4 gene.

== Function ==
This gene is a member of the paired box (PAX) family of transcription factors. Members of this gene family typically contain a paired box domain, an octapeptide, and a paired-type homeodomain. These genes play critical roles during fetal development and cancer growth. The paired box gene 4 is involved in pancreatic islet development and mouse studies have demonstrated a role for this gene in differentiation of insulin-producing beta cells.

== See also ==
- Pax genes
- Maturity onset diabetes of the young type 9
