= NeuroD =

Basic helix-loop-helix transcription factor

NeuroD, also called Beta2, is a basic helix-loop-helix transcription factor expressed in certain parts of brain, pancreatic beta cells and enteroendocrine cells. It is involved in the differentiation of nervous system and development of pancreas. It heterodimerizes with the products of E2A gene and controls the transcription of a variety of genes by identifying and binding E boxes in their promoter region. In rodents NeuroD is involved in the development of the retina.

In mammals there are two types of this factor:

- NeuroD1
- NeuroD2
- NeuroD4
- NeuroD6
