= Basic helix–loop–helix =

Protein structural motif

Basic helix–loop–helix DNA-binding domain
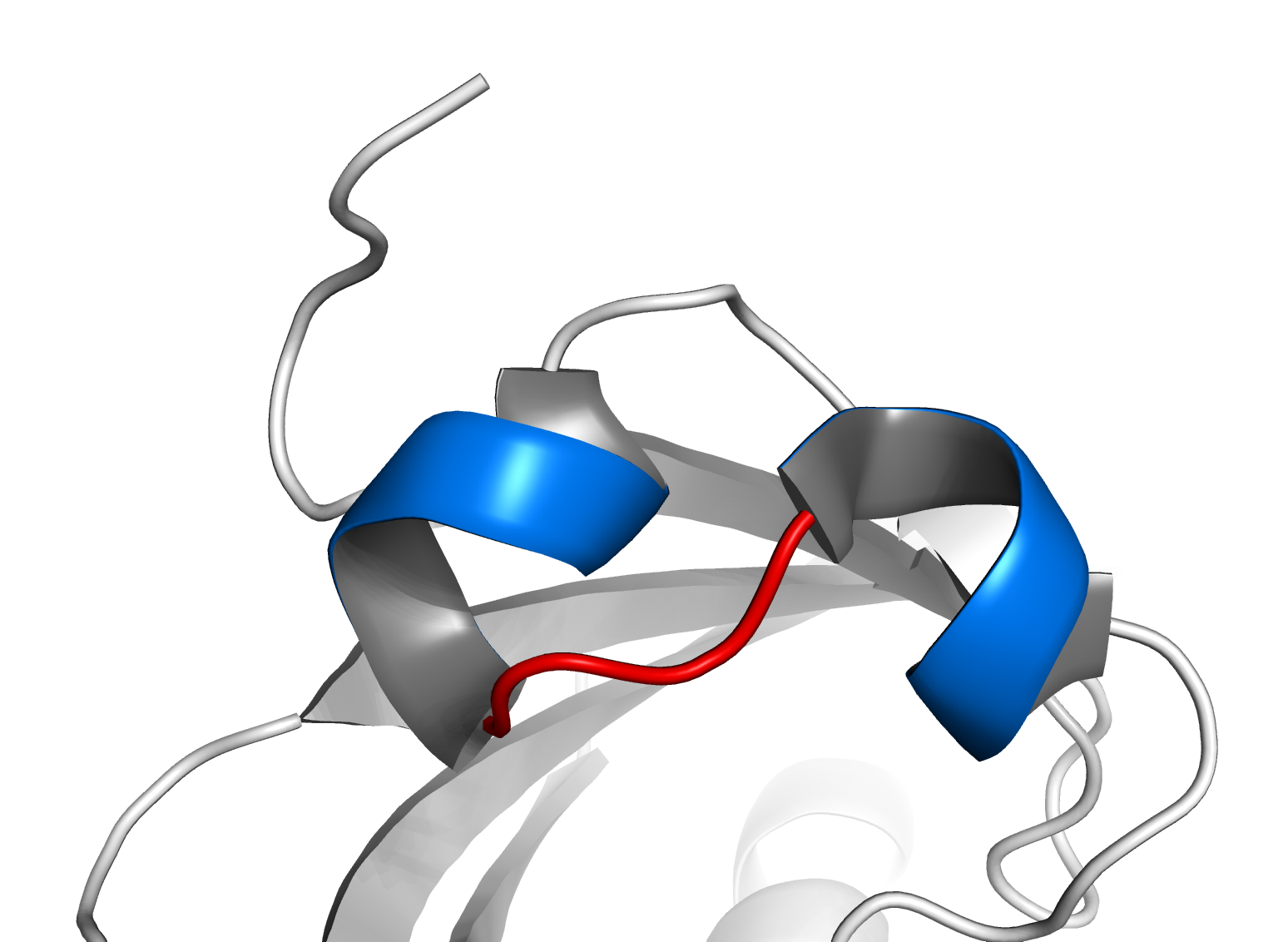
- Basic helix–loop–helix structural motif of ARNT. Two α-helices (blue) are connected by a short loop (red).

Identifiers
- Symbol: bHLH
- Pfam: PF00010
- InterPro: IPR001092
- SMART: SM00353
- PROSITE: PDOC00038
- SCOP2: 1mdy / SCOPe / SUPFAM
- CDD: cd00083
Available protein structures:
- PDB: 1a0a, 1am9, 1an2, 1an4, 1hlo, 1mdy, 1nkp, 1nlw, 1r05, 1ukl, 2ql2 IPR001092 PF00010 (ECOD; PDBsum)
- AlphaFold: IPR001092; PF00010

A basic helix–loop–helix (bHLH) is a protein structural motif that characterizes one of the largest families of dimerizing transcription factors. "Basic" refers to the basic amino acid residues in the motif, which enable the protein to bind DNA.

bHLH transcription factors are often important in development or cell activity. For one, BMAL1-Clock (also called ARNTL) is a core transcription complex in the molecular circadian clock. Other genes, like c-Myc and HIF-1, have been linked to cancer due to their effects on cell growth and metabolism.

== Structure ==
The motif is characterized by two α-helices connected by a loop. In general, transcription factors (including this type) are dimeric, each with one helix containing basic amino acid residues that facilitate DNA binding. In general, one helix is smaller, and due to the flexibility of this loop, allows dimerization by folding and packing against another helix. The larger helix typically contains the DNA-binding regions. bHLH proteins typically bind to a consensus sequence called an E-box, CANNTG. The canonical E-box is CACGTG (palindromic), however some bHLH transcription factors, notably those of the bHLH-PAS family, bind to related non-palindromic sequences, which are similar to the E-box. bHLH TFs may homodimerize or heterodimerize with other bHLH TFs and form a large variety of dimers, each one with specific functions.

== Examples ==
A phylogenetic analysis suggested that bHLH proteins fall into six major groups, indicated by letters A through F. Examples of transcription factors containing a bHLH include:

=== Group A ===
- MyoD
- Myf5
- Beta2/NeuroD1
- Scl, also known as Tal1
- proneural bHLH genes like p-CaMKII, and pSer(336)NeuroD.
- Neurogenins

=== Group B ===
- MAX
- C-Myc, N-Myc
- TCF4 (Transcription Factor 4)

=== Group C ===
These proteins contain two additional PAS domains after the bHLH domain.

- AhR
- BMAL-1-CLOCK
- HIF
- NPAS1, NPAS3, MOP5

=== Group D ===
- EMC

=== Group E ===
- HEY1 and HEY2

=== Group F ===
These proteins contain an additional COE domain

- EBF1

== Regulation ==
Since many bHLH transcription factors are heterodimeric, their activity is often highly regulated by the dimerization of the subunits. One subunit's expression or availability is often controlled, whereas the other subunit is constitutively expressed. Many of the known regulatory proteins, such as the Drosophila extramacrochaetae protein, have the helix-loop-helix structure but lack the basic region, making them unable to bind to DNA on their own. They are, however, able to form heterodimers with proteins that have the bHLH structure, and inactivate their abilities as transcription factors.

== History ==
- 1989: Murre et al. showed that dimers of various bHLH proteins bind to a short DNA motif (later called E-Box). This E-box consists of the DNA sequence CANNTG, where N can be any nucleotide.
- 1994: Harrison's and Pabo's groups crystallize bHLH proteins bound to E-boxes, demonstrating that the parallel 4-helix bundle motif loop orients the basic sequences to interact with specific nucleotides in the major groove of the E-box.
- 1994: Wharton et al. identified asymmetric E-boxes bound by a subset of bHLH proteins with PAS domains (bHLH-PAS proteins), including Single-minded (Sim) and the aromatic hydrocarbon receptor.
- 1995: Semenza's group identifies hypoxia-inducible factor (HIF) as a bHLH-PAS heterodimer that binds a related asymmetric E-box.
- 2009: Grove, De Masi et al., identified novel short DNA motifs, bound by a subset of bHLH proteins, which they defined as "E-box-like sequences". These are in the form of CAYRMK, where Y stands for C or T, R is A or G, M is A or C and K is G or T.

== Human proteins with helix–loop–helix DNA-binding domain ==
AHR; AHRR; ARNT; ARNT2; ARNTL; ARNTL2; ASCL1; ASCL2; ASCL3; ASCL4; ATOH1; ATOH7; ATOH8; BHLHB2; BHLHB3; BHLHB4; BHLHB5; BHLHB8; CLOCK; EPAS1; FERD3L; FIGLA; HAND1; HAND2; HES1; HES2; HES3; HES4; HES5; HES6; HES7; HEY1; HEY2; HIF1A; ID1; ID2; ID3; ID4; KIAA2018; LYL1; MASH1; MATH2; MAX; MESP1; MESP2; MIST1; MITF; MLX; MLXIP; MLXIPL; MNT; MSC; MSGN1; MXD1; MXD3; MXD4; MXI1; MYC; MYCL1; MYCL2; MYCN; MYF5; MYF6; MYOD1; MYOG; NCOA1; NCOA3; NEUROD1; NEUROD2; NEUROD4; NEUROD6; NEUROG1; NEUROG2; NEUROG3; NHLH1; NHLH2; NPAS1; NPAS2; NPAS3; NPAS4; OAF1; OLIG1; OLIG2; OLIG3; PTF1A; SCL; SCXB; SIM1; SIM2; SOHLH1; SOHLH2; SREBF1; SREBF2; TAL1; TAL2; TCF12; TCF15; TCF21; TCF3; TCF4; TCFL5; TFAP4; TFE3; TFEB; TFEC; TWIST1; TWIST2; USF1; USF2.

== See also ==
- Basic helix-loop-helix leucine zipper transcription factors
