= HES1 =

Protein found in humans

Identifiers
- Aliases: HES1, HES-1, HHL, HRY, bHLHb39, hes family bHLH transcription factor 1
- External IDs: OMIM: 139605; MGI: 104853; GeneCards: HES1
Available structures
| PDB | Ortholog search: PDBe RCSB |
| PDB | List of PDB id codes 2MH3 |

Gene location (Human)
| Chr. | Chromosome 3 (human) |
| Band | 3q29 | Start | 194,136,148 bp |
| Band | 3q29 | End | 194,138,732 bp |

Gene location (Mouse)
| Chr. | Chromosome 16 (mouse) |
| Band | 16 B2|16 21.09 cM | Start | 29,883,202 bp |
| Band | 16 B2|16 21.09 cM | End | 29,886,614 bp |
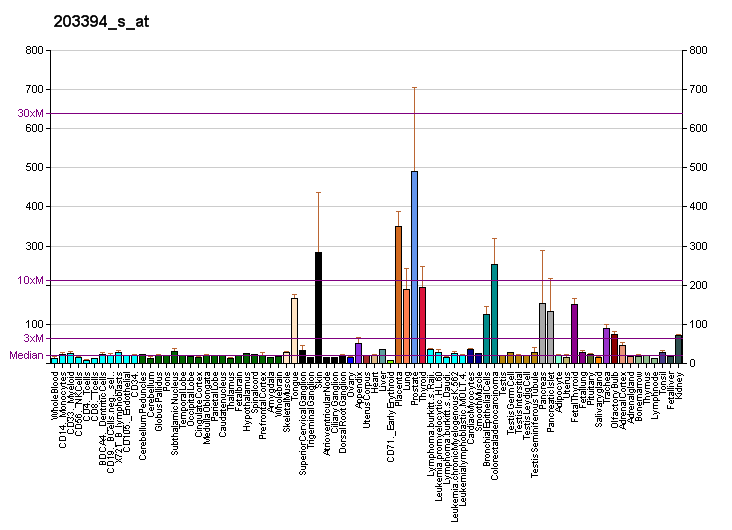

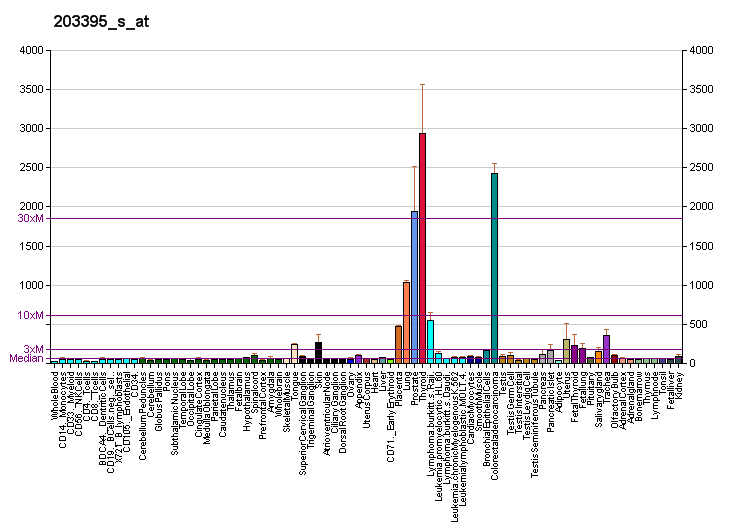
RNA expression pattern
| Bgee | Human / Mouse (ortholog); Top expressed in: renal medulla; ventricular zone; nipple; mucosa of pharynx; urethra; saphenous vein; pylorus; pericardium; vena cava; body of tongue / Top expressed in: lip; transitional epithelium of urinary bladder; ventricular zone; middle ear; ciliary body; embryo; tail of embryo; Eustachian tube; bile duct; hair follicle; More reference expression data |
| BioGPS | More reference expression data |
Gene ontology
| Molecular function | protein dimerization activity; DNA-binding transcription factor activity; histone deacetylase binding; transcription factor binding; protein binding; sequence-specific DNA binding; chaperone binding; DNA-binding transcription repressor activity, RNA polymerase II-specific; N-box binding; protein homodimerization activity; DNA binding; DNA-binding transcription factor activity, RNA polymerase II-specific; RNA polymerase II transcription regulatory region sequence-specific DNA binding; transcription corepressor activity; E-box binding; sequence-specific double-stranded DNA binding |
| Cellular component | cytoplasm; intracellular anatomical structure; nucleus; nucleoplasm |
| Biological process | pattern specification process; auditory receptor cell fate determination; midbrain-hindbrain boundary morphogenesis; inner ear receptor cell stereocilium organization; negative regulation of neuron differentiation; metanephric nephron tubule morphogenesis; cell morphogenesis involved in neuron differentiation; regulation of transcription by RNA polymerase II; lateral inhibition; cardiac neural crest cell development involved in outflow tract morphogenesis; negative regulation of stem cell differentiation; inner ear auditory receptor cell differentiation; negative regulation of pro-B cell differentiation; negative regulation of inner ear receptor cell differentiation; regulation of neurogenesis; positive regulation of Notch signaling pathway; cochlea development; cell fate commitment; regulation of transcription, DNA-templated; lung development; negative regulation of inner ear auditory receptor cell differentiation; negative regulation of cell differentiation; labyrinthine layer blood vessel development; in utero embryonic development; cell maturation; adenohypophysis development; regulation of timing of neuron differentiation; regulation of fat cell differentiation; transcription, DNA-templated; positive regulation of transcription, DNA-templated; telencephalon development; positive regulation of T cell proliferation; neural tube development; pancreas development; hindbrain morphogenesis; smoothened signaling pathway; negative regulation of stomach neuroendocrine cell differentiation; ureteric bud morphogenesis; regulation of inner ear auditory receptor cell differentiation; oculomotor nerve development; regulation of timing of cell differentiation; nervous system development; cell adhesion; positive regulation of BMP signaling pathway; midbrain development; establishment of epithelial cell polarity; pituitary gland development; comma-shaped body morphogenesis; somatic stem cell population maintenance; trochlear nerve development; aorta morphogenesis; negative regulation of forebrain neuron differentiation; negative regulation of pancreatic A cell differentiation; regulation of secondary heart field cardioblast proliferation; common bile duct development; renal interstitial fibroblast development; forebrain radial glial cell differentiation; S-shaped body morphogenesis; glomerulus vasculature development; liver development; regulation of epithelial cell proliferation; cell migration; positive regulation of transcription by RNA polymerase II; ventricular septum morphogenesis; negative regulation of oligodendrocyte differentiation; ascending aorta morphogenesis; outflow tract morphogenesis; positive regulation of astrocyte differentiation; ventricular septum development; vascular associated smooth muscle cell development; embryonic heart tube morphogenesis; positive regulation of receptor signaling pathway via JAK-STAT; Notch signaling pathway; positive regulation of mitotic cell cycle, embryonic; negative regulation of transcription, DNA-templated; thymus development; positive regulation of DNA binding; negative regulation of glial cell proliferation; neuronal stem cell population maintenance; positive regulation of cell population proliferation; negative regulation of transcription by RNA polymerase II; artery morphogenesis; pharyngeal arch artery morphogenesis; positive regulation of tyrosine phosphorylation of STAT protein; protein-containing complex assembly; regulation of receptor signaling pathway via JAK-STAT; somitogenesis; cell differentiation; anterior/posterior pattern specification; negative regulation of cell fate determination |
Sources:Amigo / QuickGO
Orthologs
| Databases | NCBI: entry; OMA: entry |
| Species | Human | Mouse |
| Entrez | 3280 | 15205 |
| Ensembl | ENSG00000114315 | ENSMUSG00000022528 |
| UniProt | Q14469 | P35428 |
| RefSeq (mRNA) | NM_005524 | NM_008235 |
| RefSeq (protein) | NP_005515 | NP_032261 |
| Location (UCSC) | Chr 3: 194.14 – 194.14 Mb | Chr 16: 29.88 – 29.89 Mb |
| PubMed search |
- Wikidata
| View/Edit Human | View/Edit Mouse |

Transcription factor HES1 (hairy and enhancer of split-1) is a protein that is encoded by the Hes1 gene, and is the mammalian homolog of the hairy gene in Drosophila. HES1 is one of the seven members of the Hes gene family (HES1-7). Hes genes code nuclear proteins that suppress transcription.

This protein belongs to the basic helix-loop-helix (bHLH) family of transcription factors. It is a transcriptional repressor of genes that require a bHLH protein for their transcription. The protein has a particular type of basic domain that contains a helix interrupting protein that binds to the N-box promoter region rather than the canonical enhancer box (E-box). As a member of the bHLH family, it is a transcriptional repressor that influences cell proliferation and differentiation in embryogenesis. HES1 regulates its own expression via a negative feedback loop, and oscillates with approximately 2-hour periodicity.

== Structure ==
There are three conserved domains in Hes genes that impart transcriptional functions: the bHLH domain, the Orange domain, and the WRPW motif. Hes genes differ from other bHLH factors in that they have a proline residue in the middle of the basic DNA binding region. This proline has been proposed to give Hes proteins unique DNA binding capacity. While most bHLH factors bind to the E-box consensus sequence (CANNTG) that is present in the promoter region of target genes, Hes factors bind more preferentially to the Class C site or N box (CACNAG). The Orange domain serves to regulate the choice of bHLH heterodimer partners. The C-terminal WRPW domain inhibits transcription.

== Interactions ==
Similarly to other HES proteins, Hes1 has been shown to interact with the co-repressors encoded by the Transducin-like E(spl) (TLE) genes and the Groucho-related gene (Grg), both homologs of the Drosophila groucho. Because Groucho in Drosophila inhibits transcription by recruiting histone deacetylase, it is likely that a Hes-Groucho complex actively blocks transcription by disabling chromatin. Hes proteins also heterodimerize with bHLH repressors such as Hey1 and Hey2, a process which also blocks transcription. Hes factors also heterodimerize with bHLH activators such as E47, also known as Tcfe2a, and Mash1, also known as Ascl1, both of which are the mammalian homologs to proneural genes in Drosophila. The E47-Hes and Mash1-Hes heterodimer complexes cannot bind DNA, and therefore repress transcription. Hes1 also interacts with TLE2 and Sirtuin 1.

== HES1 and stem cells ==
HES1 influences the maintenance of certain stem cells and progenitor cells. Specifically, HES1 influences the timing of differentiation by repressing bHLH activators, and determines binary cell fate. HES1 has been shown to play a large role in both the nervous, and digestive systems. HES1 has been shown to influence these two systems partially through the Notch signaling pathway.

=== Neural development ===
HES1 is expressed in both neuroepithelial cells and radial glial cells, both neural stem cells. Hes1 expression, along with that of Hes5, covers the majority of the developing embryo at embryonic day 10.5. After this point, expression of Hes1 is limited to the subventricular zone. In HES1 knockout (KO) mice, Mash1 is compensatorily upregulated, and neurogenesis is accelerated. Indeed, if the expression of Hes1, Hes3, and Hes5 genes is inhibited, the expression of proneural genes increases, and while neurogenesis is accelerated, neural stem cells become prematurely depleted. Contrariwise, if these HES genes are overexpressed, neurogenesis is inhibited. Thus HES1 genes are only involved in maintaining, not creating, neural stem cells.

Additionally, HES1 can guide neural stem cells down one of two paths of differentiation. HES1 can maintain neural stem cells expressing Pax6, but leads cells that are Pax6-negative to an astrocyte differentiation fate. Epigenetic modifications such as DNA methylation also influence HES1's ability to direct differentiation. Demethylation of HES1 target sites in the promoter region of astrocyte-specific genes hastens astrocyte differentiation. The oscillatory nature of Hes1 expression has a role in determining differentiation fate as well. HES1-high embryonic stem cells that received a differentiation signal often adopted a mesodermal fate, while HES1-low cells that received a differentiation signal differentiated into neuronal cells. These results were confirmed using quantitative PCR which showed that HES1-high cells showed high levels of Brachyury and Fgf5 expression (both of which are expressed highly in mesodermal cell types) with comparatively low levels genes expressed in neural cells such as Nestin. By contrast, HES1-low cells showed high levels of expression of genes involved in neural induction and low levels of expression of genes involved in mesodermal differentiation. Cycling HES1 levels also contribute to the maintenance of neural progenitor cells by regulating Neurogenin2 (Ngn2) and Dll1 oscillations. Hes1 levels fluctuate at different frequencies in different parts of the central nervous system: HES1 is continuously expressed at high levels in the boundaries, but vacillates in the compartments. This suggests that alternating HES1 levels may prompt differences in characteristics between anatomical elements of the central nervous system.

=== Interactions with the Notch pathway ===
HES1 also plays an important role in the Notch signaling pathway. In the absence of Notch signaling, RBPJ inhibits the expression of HES1. After Notch signals have been processed within the cell, however, the plasma membrane releases the intracellular domain of Notch, which moves to the nucleus where it associates with RBPJ. The binding causes a conformational change which leads co-repressors to disassociate and allows co-activators to bind. The new activating complex then prompts HES1 expression. Notch signaling activates HES1 expression. HES1 has been shown to target at least Notch ligands: Dll1, Jagged1 (Jag1), and Neurogenin-2.^{,} Dll1, as with other Notch ligands, has been shown to induce neural differentiation, and HES1 binding of Dll1 blocks neural differentiation and leads to the maintenance of the neural stem cells and neural progenitor cells. Notch signaling also occurs in the intestinal crypt cells. Hyperactivated Notch causes a reduction in the number of secretory cell types (i.e. goblet cells, enteroendocrine cells, and Paneth cells). Deletion of the Notch pathway by removing the Notch expression controller, Rbpsuh, causes the production of nearly only goblet cells.

=== Digestive system ===
HES1 has been shown to influence the differentiation decision of cells in the gastrointestinal tract. In pancreatic progenitor cells, HES1 expression inhibits the expression of Ptf1a, which controls exocrine cell differentiation, and Ngn3, which drives differentiation of endocrine cell types that will form the islets of Langerhans. The absence of Hes1 in the developing intestine of mice promotes the increase of Math1 (a protein required for the production of intestinal secretory cell types), which leads to an increase of goblet, enteroendocrine, and Paneth cells. When Hes1 is deleted in mouse and zebrafish, surplus goblet cells and enteroendocrine cells are made while few enterocytes are made.^{,} Liver progenitor cells differentiate into two different cell types: hepatocytes and biliary epithelial cells. When Hes1 expression is low, hepatocytes form normally, but bile ducts are completely absent. This phenotype resembles Alagille syndrome, a hallmark of which is mutations in Jagged1. Therefore, Hes-Notch interactions also play a role in digestive organ development.
