= ID-2 =

ID-2 or ID2 may refer to:

- ID-2 format, a standard size for identification cards defined by ISO/IEC 7810.
- A gene called ID2 which negatively regulates cell differentiation.
- Idaho's 2nd congressional district.
