= ID-1 =

ID-1 or ID1 may refer to:

- ID-1 format, the standard "credit card" size for identification cards defined by ISO/IEC 7810
- A gene (inhibitor of DNA binding-1) which controls cancer metastasis
- Idaho's 1st congressional district
