= HES4 =

Protein found in humans

Identifiers
- Aliases: HES4, bHLHb42, hes family bHLH transcription factor 4
- External IDs: OMIM: 608060; GeneCards: HES4

Gene location (Human)
Chr.	Chromosome 1 (human)
Band	1p36.33	Start	998,962 bp
Band	1p36.33	End	1,000,172 bp
RNA expression pattern
Bgee	Human / Mouse (ortholog); Top expressed in: ventricular zone; popliteal artery; tibial arteries; olfactory zone of nasal mucosa; apex of heart; coronary artery; left coronary artery; right coronary artery; putamen; ganglionic eminence / n/a; More reference expression data
BioGPS	n/a
Gene ontology
Molecular function	DNA binding; transcription factor binding; protein dimerization activity; DNA-binding transcription factor activity, RNA polymerase II-specific; RNA polymerase II transcription regulatory region sequence-specific DNA binding; DNA-binding transcription repressor activity, RNA polymerase II-specific; transcription corepressor activity; sequence-specific DNA binding; sequence-specific double-stranded DNA binding
Cellular component	nucleus
Biological process	multicellular organism development; cell differentiation; regulation of transcription, DNA-templated; transcription, DNA-templated; nervous system development; regulation of transcription by RNA polymerase II; negative regulation of transcription by RNA polymerase II; somitogenesis; Notch signaling pathway; regulation of neurogenesis; negative regulation of nucleic acid-templated transcription; anterior/posterior pattern specification; negative regulation of neuron differentiation
Sources:Amigo / QuickGO
Orthologs
Databases	NCBI: entry; OMA: entry
Species	Human	Mouse
Entrez	57801	n/a
Ensembl	ENSG00000188290	n/a
UniProt	Q9HCC6	n/a
RefSeq (mRNA)	NM_001142467; NM_021170	n/a
RefSeq (protein)	NP_001135939; NP_066993	n/a
Location (UCSC)	Chr 1: 1 – 1 Mb	n/a
PubMed search		n/a
- Wikidata
View/Edit Human

Hes Family BHLH Transcription Factor 4 (HES4) is a protein encoded by a gene of the same name located on chromosome 1 in humans. It does not currently have a known mouse ortholog.

HES4 plays a major role in key developmental processes, particularly in the immune system and bone formation. As a member of the basic helix-loop-helix (bHLH) family of transcription factors, HES4 plays a crucial role in T-cell development by responding to Notch1 signaling, which is vital for guiding hematopoietic progenitor cells toward becoming T-cells.

Additionally, HES4 has emerged as a significant factor in the context of osteosarcoma (OS), a type of bone cancer, where its expression correlates with aggressive tumor behavior and poor patient prognosis.

== Structure ==
=== Primary ===
HES4 is a polypeptide chain consisting of 221 amino acids with a molecular weight of 23,523 Da.

=== Secondary ===
The secondary structure of the completed HES4 protein features a structural motif known as the basic helix-loop-helix (bHLH). This motif is characterized by two alpha helices connected by a loop, which allows for a compact and flexible structure.

The bHLH domain plays a critical role in DNA binding and protein–protein interactions, making it significant in various biological processes, particularly in the regulation of gene expression. In HES4, the basic region of the motif typically contains positively charged amino acids that facilitate binding to specific DNA sequences, often in the context of transcriptional regulation.

== Function ==
=== Notch1 activation ===
HES4 plays an important role in the development of T-cells, which are a type of white blood cell that are a crucial part of the mammalian immune system. The process of T-cell development starts when a signaling pathway called Notch1 is activated in certain blood precursor cells, known as hematopoietic progenitor cells.

Notch1 activation is crucial for initiating T-cell development while suppressing differentiation into other lineages. While the functions of these genes are well understood in mice, the absence of a mouse ortholog for HES4 has made its role in humans less clear.

When Notch1 is activated, it acts like a switch that encourages these cells to become T-cells instead of other types of blood cells, such as those involved in the immune response or red blood cell formation. HES4 is one of the genes that responds to this activation, helping to guide the cells along the T-cell development path.

Research has shown that HES4 works alongside another gene called HES1. While both genes help suppress the development of other cell types, they do so in different ways. HES1 primarily keeps the cells in a resting state, allowing them to maintain their potential to become T-cells. In contrast, HES4 also supports the early stages of T-cell development but does not prevent the formation of B-cells, another important type of immune cell.

Together, HES4 and HES1 ensure that as blood precursor cells receive the Notch1 signal, so that they successfully start their journey to becoming T-cells.

== Clinical significance ==
Because T-cells play an important role in constantly scrutinizing and destroying tumor cells, and HES4 is important for the development of T-cells in humans, it has been hypothesised to be an oncogene and has been investigated using human cell lines and mice.

=== Bone cancer ===
The clinical significance of HES4 in osteosarcoma (OS) is highlighted by its potential as a prognostic biomarker.

Studies using human OS cell lines both in vitro and injecting them into live mice in vivo have confirmed that overexpressing HES4 leads to larger and more aggressive tumors, with a greater tendency to spread to other parts of the body.

Interestingly, while overexpressing HES4 promotes aggressive tumor behavior by inhibiting the normal bone cell differentiation process, another Notch1 target gene, HES1, has opposing effects, where overexpression has a preventative effect on tumor growth.
