= Inhibitor of DNA-binding protein =

Inhibitor of DNA-binding/differentiation proteins, also known as ID proteins comprise a family of proteins that heterodimerize with basic helix-loop-helix (bHLH) transcription factors to inhibit DNA binding of bHLH proteins. ID proteins also contain the HLH-dimerization domain but lack the basic DNA-binding domain and thus regulate bHLH transcription factors when they heterodimerize with bHLH proteins. The first helix-loop-helix proteins identified were named E-proteins because they bind to Ephrussi-box (E-box) sequences. In normal development, E proteins form dimers with other bHLH transcription factors, allowing transcription to occur. However, in cancerous phenotypes, ID proteins can regulate transcription by binding E proteins, so no dimers can be formed and transcription is inactive. E proteins are members of the class I bHLH family and form dimers with bHLH proteins from class II to regulate transcription. Four ID proteins exist in humans: ID1, ID2, ID3, and ID4. The ID homologue gene in Drosophila is called extramacrochaetae (EMC) and encodes a transcription factor of the helix-loop-helix family that lacks a DNA binding domain. EMC regulates cell proliferation, formation of organs like the midgut, and wing development. ID proteins could be potential targets for systemic cancer therapies without inhibiting the functioning of most normal cells because they are highly expressed in embryonic stem cells, but not in differentiated adult cells. Evidence suggests that ID proteins are overexpressed in many types of cancer. For example, ID1 is overexpressed in pancreatic, breast, and prostate cancers. ID2 is upregulated in neuroblastoma, Ewing’s sarcoma, and squamous cell carcinoma of the head and neck.

== Function ==
ID proteins are key regulators of development where they function to prevent premature differentiation of stem cells. By inhibiting the formation of E-protein dimers that promote differentiation, ID proteins can regulate the timing of differentiation of stem cells during development. An increase in ID expression is seen in embryonic and adult stem cells. ID proteins also promote cell cycle progression, delaying senescence, and help facilitate cell migration. In contrast, inappropriate regulation of ID proteins in differentiated cells can contribute to tumorigenesis. Generally, IDs function as oncogenes. When ID proteins are overexpressed, cell proliferation is enhanced and cells become insensitive to growth factor depletion. Expression of ID proteins in neurons halts neuron axon growth and allows elongation of neurons. Knockout mouse data show that ID genes are essential for heart development. There is some controversy surrounding the ID proteins and their role in cancer, but overexpression is seen in most tumor types. There are a few exceptions, for example, an increase in ID1 expression in brain cancer is correlated with a better prognosis, while a decrease in ID4 expression in colon and rectal cancers is linked to a poorer prognosis. ID proteins can bind E-proteins, preventing them from binding bHLH proteins and halting transcription, a case often seen in cancerous phenotypes.

== Subtypes ==
Humans express four types of Id proteins (called ID1, ID2, ID3, and ID4).

A recent publication in Cancer Research (August 2010) has shown that ID1 can be used to mark endothelial progenitor cells which are critical to tumour growth and angiogenesis. This publication has demonstrated that targeting ID1 resulted in decreased tumour growth. Therefore, ID1 could be used to design a novel cancer therapy.

Perk, Iavarone, and Benezra, (2005), reviewed fifteen studies and compiled a list of the phenotypic effects of each ID gene when knocked out in mice. When ID1 was knocked out, a defect in T-cell migration was seen. A knockout of ID2 showed that 25% of mice died perinatally, and those born lacked lymph nodes and showed defects in mammary proliferation. Generally, normal development was seen in mice with an ID3 knockout, but they did have a defect in B-cell proliferation. Neural defects and premature differentiation were seen in mice lacking ID4. Knockout of both ID1 and ID3 resulted in embryonic lethality due to brain hemorrhages and abnormalities in cardiac development.
