= ID4 =

Protein-coding gene in humans

Identifiers
- Aliases: ID4, IDB4, bHLHb27, inhibitor of DNA binding 4, HLH protein
- External IDs: OMIM: 600581; MGI: 99414; GeneCards: ID4

Gene location (Human)
Chr.	Chromosome 6 (human)
Band	6p22.3	Start	19,837,370 bp
Band	6p22.3	End	19,842,197 bp

Gene location (Mouse)
Chr.	Chromosome 13 (mouse)
Band	13 A5|13 24.71 cM	Start	48,414,704 bp
Band	13 A5|13 24.71 cM	End	48,419,502 bp
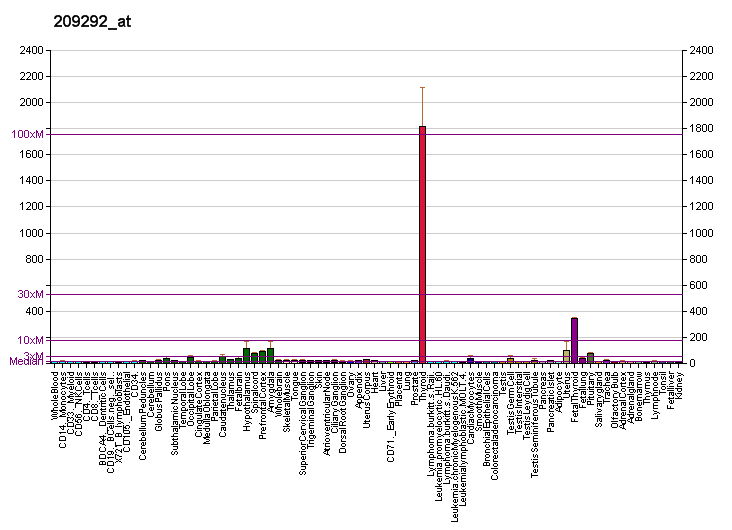

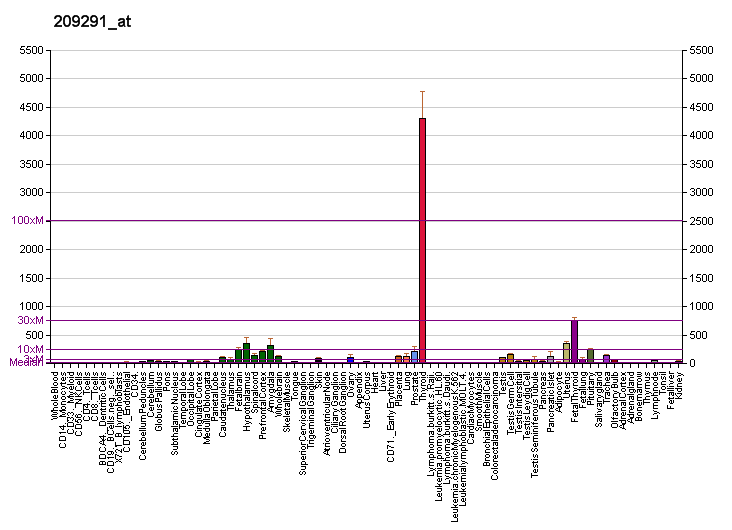

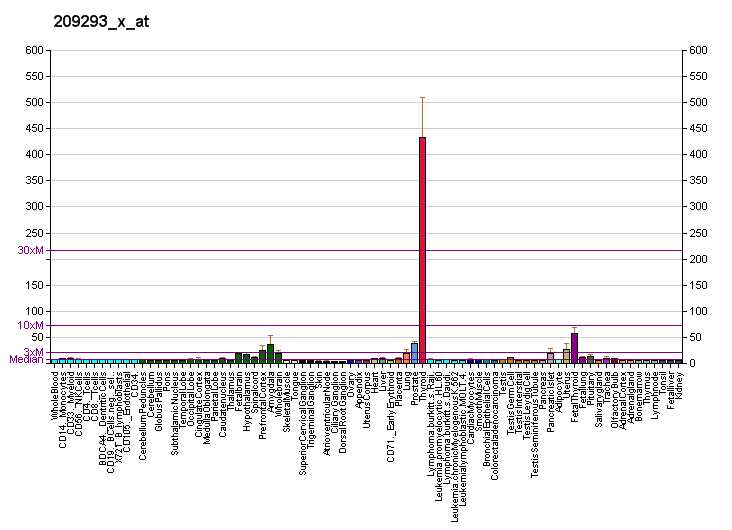
RNA expression pattern
Bgee	Human / Mouse (ortholog); Top expressed in: skin of hip; skin of thigh; ventricular zone; germinal epithelium; optic nerve; hair follicle; urethra; thyroid gland; seminal vesicula; left lobe of thyroid gland / Top expressed in: olfactory tubercle; Rostral migratory stream; optic nerve; medial dorsal nucleus; lateral septal nucleus; supraoptic nucleus; nucleus accumbens; aortic valve; globus pallidus; utricle; More reference expression data
BioGPS	More reference expression data
Gene ontology
Molecular function	protein dimerization activity; transcription corepressor activity; protein binding; DNA-binding transcription factor activity, RNA polymerase II-specific; DNA-binding transcription factor activity; transcription factor binding
Cellular component	cytoplasm; nucleus
Biological process	prostate gland stromal morphogenesis; negative regulation of fat cell differentiation; negative regulation of astrocyte differentiation; regulation of transcription, DNA-templated; negative regulation of neuron differentiation; central nervous system myelination; regulation of transcription by RNA polymerase II; negative regulation of transcription by RNA polymerase II; transcription, DNA-templated; seminal vesicle morphogenesis; brain development; positive regulation of gene expression; positive regulation of osteoblast differentiation; prostate gland epithelium morphogenesis; negative regulation of oligodendrocyte differentiation; circadian rhythm; positive regulation of cell population proliferation; prostate gland morphogenesis; neuroblast proliferation; cerebral cortex neuron differentiation; cell population proliferation; negative regulation of transcription, DNA-templated; hippocampus development; fat cell differentiation; positive regulation of transcription by RNA polymerase II; G1/S transition of mitotic cell cycle; neuron differentiation; negative regulation of DNA binding; regulation of cell cycle; osteoblast differentiation
Sources:Amigo / QuickGO
Orthologs
Databases	NCBI: entry; OMA: entry
Species	Human	Mouse
Entrez	3400	15904
Ensembl	ENSG00000172201	ENSMUSG00000021379
UniProt	P47928	P41139
RefSeq (mRNA)	NM_001546	NM_031166
RefSeq (protein)	NP_001537	NP_112443
Location (UCSC)	Chr 6: 19.84 – 19.84 Mb	Chr 13: 48.41 – 48.42 Mb
PubMed search
- Wikidata
View/Edit Human	View/Edit Mouse

ID4 is a protein coding gene. In humans, it encodes the protein known as DNA-binding protein inhibitor ID-4. This protein is known to be involved in the regulation of many cellular processes during both prenatal development and tumorigenesis. This is inclusive of embryonic cellular growth, senescence, cellular differentiation, apoptosis, and as an oncogene in angiogenesis.

== Structure ==
The gene spans 3.3kb on the plus strand. It is composed of 3 exons and during transcription its mRNA is 2343 bp. The encoded protein consists of 161 amino acids, is 16.6 KDa and contains a poly-Ala segment from amino acid 39 to 48, a helix-loop-helix motif from amino acid 65 to 105 and a poly-Pro region from amino acid 118 to 124. This protein is expressed in various tissues.

== Function ==
The ID4 gene is part of the ID gene family. This family is also known as inhibitors of DNA binding protein family and are composed of transcription inhibitory proteins which modulate a number of processes. They are transcriptional regulators that work by negatively regulating their basic helix-loop-helix (bHLH) transcription factors by forming heterodimers. The heterodimer is what inhibits their DNA binding and transcriptional activity.

Transcription factors containing a basic helix-loop-helix (bHLH) motif regulate expression of tissue-specific genes in a number of mammalian and insect systems. DNA-binding activity of the bHLH proteins is dependent on formation of homo- and/or heterodimers. Dominant-negative (antimorph) HLH proteins encoded by Id-related genes, such as ID4, also contain the HLH-dimerization domain but lack the DNA-binding basic domain. Consequently, ID proteins inhibit binding to DNA and transcriptional transactivation by heterodimerization with bHLH proteins.

=== Regulation during embryogenesis ===
The ID4 gene plays a pivotal role in development and is a key player in many pathways of embryogenesis and foetal development. ID4 expression is upregulated in embryogenesis during days 9.5 and 13.5 of gestation and restricted to specific cells of the central and peripheral nervous system. ID4 transcription control has both negative and positive regulatory elements inclusive of novel inhibitory functions.

ID4 expression has been shown to be discrete in the early stages, with transcription transiently expressed in subsets of migrating neural crest cells, the dorsal myocardium, the segmental plate mesoderm, and the tail bud. Later stages show ID4 expression in the telencephalic vesicles and corneal epithelium. ID4 expression is only detected in neuronal tissues and the ventral portion of the epithelium in the developing stomach during embryogenesis.

ID4 is expressed in the central nervous system and is required for G1-S transition and to enhance proliferation in early cortical progenitors. It is complexly involved in regulating neural stem cell proliferation and differentiation by inhibiting proliferation of differentiating neurons through enhancement of RB1-mediated pathways. This is either by direct interaction or through interaction with other molecules of the cell cycle machinery. ID4 also regulates the lateral expansion of the proliferative zone in the developing cortex and hippocampus. This is integral to normal brain size formation. ID4 regulates neural progenitor proliferation and differentiation. Its expression is seen in the neural tube much later than other ID genes.

ID4 was also shown to be involved in the regulation of cardiac mesoderm function in frog embryos and human embryonic stem cells. Ablation of the ID gene family mouse embryos showed failure of anterior cardiac progenitor specification and the development of heartless embryos. This study also demonstrated that ID4 protein is involved in the regulating cardiac cell fate by a pathway which represses two inhibitors of cardiogenic mesoderm formation (TCF3 and FOXA2) whilst activating inducers (EVX1, GRRP1, and MESP1).

== Clinical significance ==
=== Role in endometriosis ===
ID4 has been linked to the molecular pathogenicity of endometriosis. These pathways are still poorly understood. It is thought that ID4 plays a role in the transcription of HOXA9 and CDKN1A which are known to be associated with endometriosis.

A genome wide association study revealed over 100 candidate genes associated with endometriosis. Of these, six were shown to have a highly reliable association, of which the ID4 gene was identified. This is thought to be due to an independent single nucleotide polymorphism at loci rs7739264 near ID4 on chromosome 6p22.3. ID4 is implicated in the molecular pathogenicity of endometriosis as being differentially expressed between the proliferative, early and mid-secretory phases.

=== Tumorigenesis association ===
ID4 is not expressed in normal ovary and fallopian tubes. It has been shown to be overexpressed in most primary ovarian cancers. The ID4 gene is also seen to be overexpressed in most ovarian, endometrial and breast cancer cell lines. The mechanism behind this is believed to be that ID4 regulates HOXA9 and CDKN1A genes, which are mediators of cell proliferation and differentiation. HOXA genes are known to play a role in the differentiation of fallopian tubes, uterus, cervix and vagina.

In B-Cell (B lymphocyte) acute lymphoblastic leukaemia (B-ALL), ID4 is overexpressed due to being located in close proximity to the IgH enhancer region.

In Non Hodgkin lymphoma, the ID4 promoter region is implicated in follicular lymphomas, diffuse B Cell lymphomas and lymphoid cell lines due to hypermethylation.

In brain tumours, more specifically oligodendroglial tumours and glioblastomas, the ID4 gene has been shown to be expressed in the neoplastic astrocytes but not expressed in the neoplastic oligodendrocytes.

The ID4 promoter region has been found to be hypermethylated and its mRNA suppressed in breast cancer cell lines including that of primary breast cancers. Patients with invasive carcinomas have shown ID4 expression in their breast cancer specimens. This has been identified as a significant risk factor in nodal metastasis. ID4 is constitutively expressed in normal human mammary epithelium but found to be suppressed in ER positive breast carcinomas and preneoplastic lesions. ER negative carcinomas also show ID4 expression. There is a hypothesis that ID4 acts as a tumour suppressor factory in human breast tissue where oestrogen is responsible for regulation of ID4 expression in the mammary ductal epithelium.

It is unclear whether the ID4 gene plays a role in bladder cancer. ID4 is found on the 6p22.3 amplicon which is frequently associated with advance stage bladder cancer. ID4 has also been shown to be overexpressed in bladder cancer cell lines. This overexpression is equally seen in both normal urothelium which lines the urinary tract inclusive of the renal pelvis, ureters, bladder and parts of the urethra, but also seen in fresh cancer tissues.

ID4 is closely associated with gastric cancer. The ID4 promoter region is hypermethylated and infrequently expressed in gastric adenocarcinomas and frequently expressed in gastric cancer cell lines. In contrast, ID4 is highly expressed in normal gastric mucosa. There is an undefined but significant association seen in ID4 promoter hypermethylation (which results in its down regulation) and microsatellite instability.

ID4 is not found in normal epitheliums nor adenomas of colorectal cancer. Hypermethylation of ID4 causes silencing of the gene. This has been identified as a significant independent risk factor for poor prognosis of colorectal cancer. It is also frequently observed in liver metastases of colorectal cancer specimens.

=== Developmental disorders ===
Rett syndrome is an X linked neurodevelopment disorder. It is often identified after six to eight months of age in females. In human brain tissue specimens of Rett syndrome patients, the family of ID genes are seen to be significantly increased in expression.

== Society and culture ==
=== Commonly used names ===
The ID4 gene is also known as DNA-binding protein inhibitor ID-4, Id-4, IDb4, IDB4, Inhibitor of DNA binding 4, Inhibitor of differentiation 4, helix protein 271, Inhibitor of DNA binding 4 HLH Protein, Inhibitor of Differentiation 4, Inhibitor of DNA Binding 4 Dominant Negative Helix-Loop-Helix Protein, Class B Basic Helix-Loop-Helix Protein 27, and BHLHb272.

== See also ==
- Inhibitor of DNA-binding protein
