= NPAS1 =

Protein found in humans

Identifiers
- Aliases: NPAS1, MOP5, PASD5, bHLHe11, neuronal PAS domain protein 1
- External IDs: OMIM: 603346; MGI: 109205; GeneCards: NPAS1

Gene location (Human)
Chr.	Chromosome 19 (human)
Band	19q13.32	Start	47,019,820 bp
Band	19q13.32	End	47,045,775 bp

Gene location (Mouse)
Chr.	Chromosome 7 (mouse)
Band	7 A2|7 9.14 cM	Start	16,189,646 bp
Band	7 A2|7 9.14 cM	End	16,211,653 bp
RNA expression pattern
Bgee	Human / Mouse (ortholog); Top expressed in: right frontal lobe; prefrontal cortex; cingulate gyrus; anterior cingulate cortex; amygdala; gonad; dorsolateral prefrontal cortex; Brodmann area 9; skin of leg; pancreatic ductal cell / Top expressed in: urethra; male urethra; CA3 field; dentate gyrus of hippocampal formation granule cell; entorhinal cortex; perirhinal cortex; primary visual cortex; superior frontal gyrus; central gray substance of midbrain; embryo; More reference expression data
BioGPS	n/a
Gene ontology
Molecular function	DNA-binding transcription factor activity; DNA binding; protein dimerization activity; DNA-binding transcription factor activity, RNA polymerase II-specific; protein heterodimerization activity
Cellular component	nucleus
Biological process	regulation of transcription by RNA polymerase II; central nervous system development; regulation of transcription, DNA-templated; negative regulation of transcription by RNA polymerase II; startle response; maternal behavior; transcription, DNA-templated; negative regulation of transcription, DNA-templated; positive regulation of transcription by RNA polymerase II
Sources:Amigo / QuickGO
Orthologs
Databases	NCBI: entry; OMA: entry
Species	Human	Mouse
Entrez	4861	18142
Ensembl	ENSG00000130751	ENSMUSG00000001988
UniProt	Q99742	P97459
RefSeq (mRNA)	NM_002517; NM_001321086	NM_008718
RefSeq (protein)	NP_001308015; NP_002508	NP_032744
Location (UCSC)	Chr 19: 47.02 – 47.05 Mb	Chr 7: 16.19 – 16.21 Mb
PubMed search
- Wikidata
View/Edit Human	View/Edit Mouse

NPAS1 is a basic helix-loop-helix transcription factor. Npas1 is expressed in the developing forebrain in neuronal precursors of GABAergic projection neurons in the globus pallidus and basal forebrain as well as cortical and hippocampal interneurons. Experiments in mice have linked neurons expressing Npas1 in the external globus pallidus to motor control and those in the basal forebrain to sleep-wake control and stress responsiveness. Knockout and gene expression experiments have linked Npas1 to the control of behaviors and genes related to neuropsychiatric disorders

== See also ==
- NPAS3
