= TLE1 =

Protein-coding gene in the species Homo sapiens

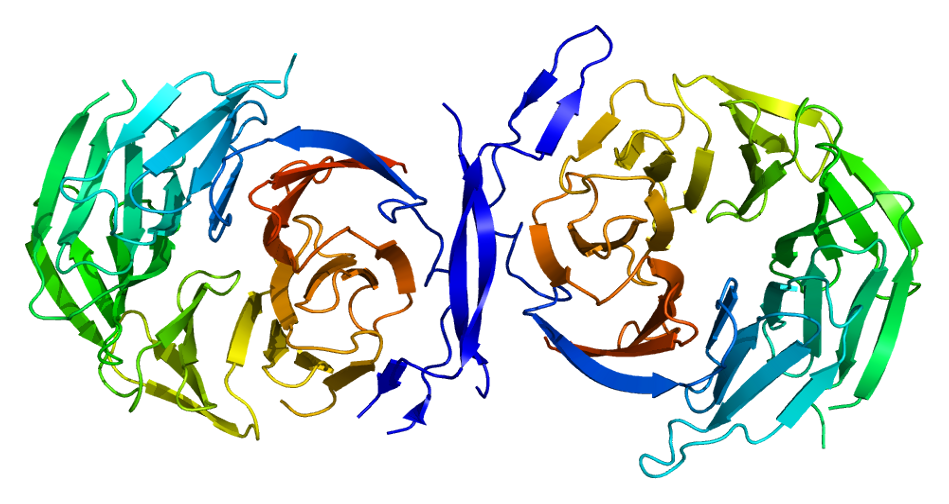

Identifiers
- Aliases: TLE1, ESG, ESG1, GRG1, transducin like enhancer of split 1, TLE family member 1, transcriptional corepressor, TLE-1
- External IDs: OMIM: 600189; MGI: 104636; GeneCards: TLE1
Available structures
PDB	Ortholog search: PDBe RCSB
PDB	List of PDB id codes 1GXR, 2CE8, 2CE9, 4OM2, 4OM3

Gene location (Human)
Chr.	Chromosome 9 (human)
Band	9q21.32	Start	81,583,683 bp
Band	9q21.32	End	81,689,547 bp

Gene location (Mouse)
Chr.	Chromosome 4 (mouse)
Band	4|4 C2	Start	72,035,379 bp
Band	4|4 C2	End	72,119,156 bp
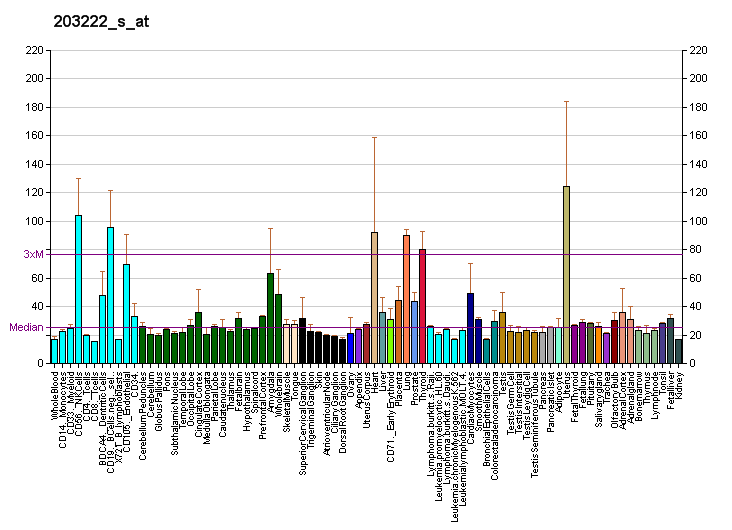

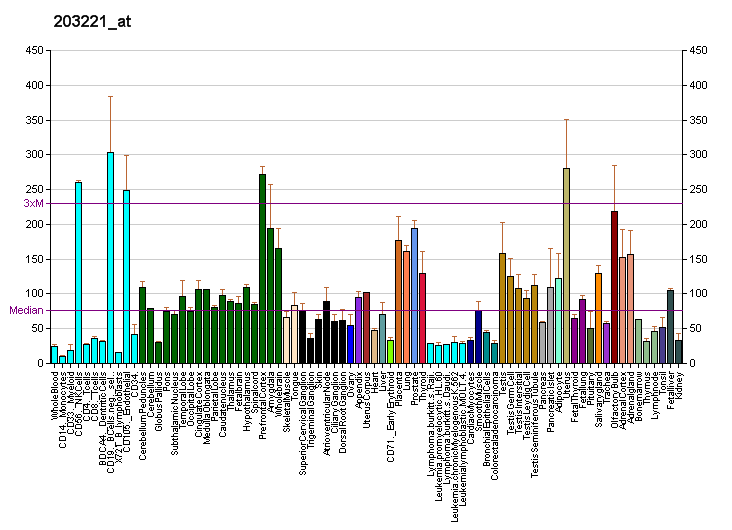

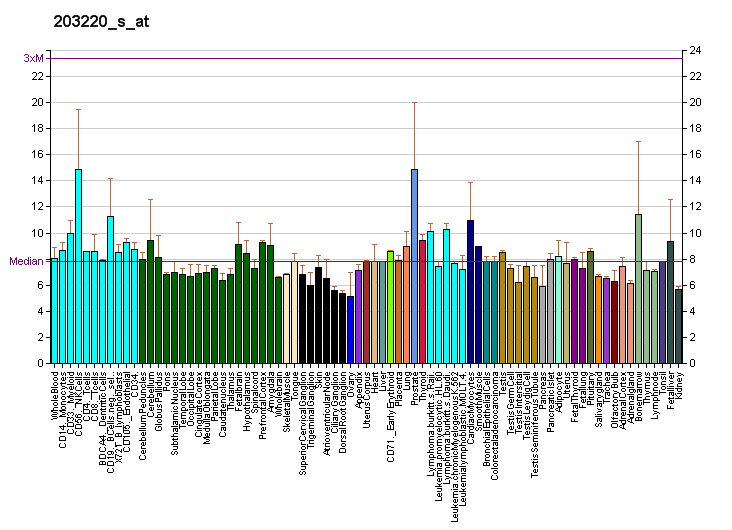
RNA expression pattern
Bgee	Human / Mouse (ortholog); Top expressed in: ventricular zone; sural nerve; endometrium; muscle of thigh; parotid gland; right lobe of liver; canal of the cervix; ganglionic eminence; gastrocnemius muscle; middle temporal gyrus / Top expressed in: Rostral migratory stream; external carotid artery; seminal vesicula; internal carotid artery; mandibular prominence; ventricular zone; ganglionic eminence; superior cervical ganglion; maxillary prominence; vas deferens; More reference expression data
BioGPS	More reference expression data
Gene ontology
Molecular function	transcription corepressor activity; transcription factor binding; protein binding; identical protein binding
Cellular component	cytosol; nucleus; nucleoplasm; beta-catenin-TCF complex; transcription regulator complex; cytoplasm; nucleolus
Biological process	regulation of transcription, DNA-templated; negative regulation of Wnt signaling pathway; Wnt signaling pathway; negative regulation of I-kappaB kinase/NF-kappaB signaling; transcription, DNA-templated; multicellular organism development; positive regulation of gene expression; animal organ morphogenesis; negative regulation of transcription, DNA-templated; negative regulation of anoikis; signal transduction; negative regulation of transcription by RNA polymerase II; beta-catenin-TCF complex assembly; negative regulation of canonical Wnt signaling pathway
Sources:Amigo / QuickGO
Orthologs
Databases	NCBI: entry; OMA: entry
Species	Human	Mouse
Entrez	7088	21885
Ensembl	ENSG00000196781	ENSMUSG00000008305
UniProt	Q04724	Q62440
RefSeq (mRNA)	NM_001303103; NM_001303104; NM_005077	NM_001285529; NM_001285530; NM_001285531; NM_001285532; NM_011599
RefSeq (protein)	NP_001290032; NP_001290033; NP_005068	NP_001272458; NP_001272459; NP_001272460; NP_001272461; NP_035729
Location (UCSC)	Chr 9: 81.58 – 81.69 Mb	Chr 4: 72.04 – 72.12 Mb
PubMed search
- Wikidata
View/Edit Human	View/Edit Mouse

Transducin-like enhancer protein 1 is a protein that in humans is encoded by the TLE1 gene.

== Interactions ==
TLE1 has been shown to interact with:

- Glycoprotein 130,
- HES6,
- RUNX1,
- RUNX3,
- SIX3
- TLE2, and
- UTY.
