= NPAS3 =

Protein-coding gene in the species Homo sapiens

Identifiers
- Aliases: NPAS3, neuronal PAS domain protein 3, MOP6, PASD6, bHLHe12
- External IDs: OMIM: 609430; MGI: 1351610; GeneCards: NPAS3

Gene location (Human)
Chr.	Chromosome 14 (human)
Band	14q13.1	Start	32,934,396 bp
Band	14q13.1	End	33,820,863 bp

Gene location (Mouse)
Chr.	Chromosome 12 (mouse)
Band	12|12 C1	Start	53,248,677 bp
Band	12|12 C1	End	54,072,175 bp
RNA expression pattern
Bgee	Human / Mouse (ortholog); Top expressed in: endothelial cell; ventricular zone; corpus callosum; buccal mucosa cell; globus pallidus; internal globus pallidus; external globus pallidus; optic nerve; inferior ganglion of vagus nerve; entorhinal cortex / Top expressed in: substantia nigra; lumbar subsegment of spinal cord; deep cerebellar nuclei; dorsal tegmental nucleus; fossa; globus pallidus; dorsomedial hypothalamic nucleus; ventral tegmental area; condyle; lateral hypothalamus; More reference expression data
BioGPS	n/a
Gene ontology
Molecular function	protein dimerization activity; DNA binding; DNA-binding transcription factor activity, RNA polymerase II-specific; protein heterodimerization activity
Cellular component	nucleoplasm; cytosol; nucleus
Biological process	regulation of transcription by RNA polymerase II; positive regulation of transcription, DNA-templated; transcription, DNA-templated; regulation of transcription, DNA-templated; developmental process; positive regulation of transcription by RNA polymerase II
Sources:Amigo / QuickGO
Orthologs
Databases	NCBI: entry; OMA: entry
Species	Human	Mouse
Entrez	64067	27386
Ensembl	ENSG00000151322	ENSMUSG00000021010
UniProt	Q8IXF0	Q9QZQ0
RefSeq (mRNA)	NM_001164749; NM_001165893; NM_022123; NM_173159; NM_001394988 NM_001394989	NM_013780
RefSeq (protein)	NP_001158221; NP_001159365; NP_071406; NP_775182	NP_038808
Location (UCSC)	Chr 14: 32.93 – 33.82 Mb	Chr 12: 53.25 – 54.07 Mb
PubMed search
- Wikidata
View/Edit Human	View/Edit Mouse

NPAS3 or Neuronal PAS domain protein 3 is a brain-enriched transcription factor belonging to the bHLH-PAS superfamily of transcription factors, the members of which carry out diverse functions, including circadian oscillations, neurogenesis, toxin metabolism, hypoxia, and tracheal development. NPAS3 contains a basic helix-loop-helix structural motif and two PAS domain, like the other proteins in the superfamily.

It functions as an heterodimer by binding ARNT2, another member of the bHLH-PAS superfamily.

== Function ==
NPAS3 harbors the largest cluster of human accelerated regions, suggesting it may have played a key role in human evolution. Among this accelerated elements, HAR202 is particularly fascinating due to its differential activity between modern humans and archaic species, even though it has only been reported in animal reporter assays.

From the first set of human accelerated regions described in 2006, NPAS3 locus overlaps one of the most accelerated sequences, HAR21 .

NPAS1 and NPAS3-deficient mice display behavioral abnormalities typical to the animal models of schizophrenia. Targeting the gene in astrocytes leads to autistic-like behaviours such as reduced vocalization and socialization.

According to the same study, NPAS1 and NPAS3 disruption leads to reduced expression of reelin, which is also consistently found to be reduced in the brains of human patients with schizophrenia and psychotic bipolar disorder.

Recent advances in mouse models have further characterized NPAS3 function and identified key roles in astrogenesis, adult neurogenesis and in inhibitory interneurons differentiation.

== Clinical significance ==
Disruption of NPAS3 was found in one family affected by schizophrenia and NPAS3 gene is thought to be associated with psychiatric illness and learning disability. In a genetic study of several hundred subjects conducted in 2008, interacting haplotypes at the NPAS3 locus were found to affect the risk of schizophrenia and bipolar disorder.

In a pharmacogenetical study, polymorphisms in NPAS3 gene were highly associated with response to iloperidone, a proposed atypical antipsychotic.
