= Extramacrochaetae =

extra-macrochaetae

Identifiers
- Organism: Drosophila melanogaster
- Symbol: emc
- UniProt: P18491
Search for
- Structures: Swiss-model
- Domains: InterPro

The gene extramachrochaetae (emc) is a Drosophila melanogaster gene that codes for the Emc protein, which has a wide variety of developmental roles. It was named, as is common for Drosophila genes, after the phenotypic change caused by a mutation in the gene (macrochaetae are the longer bristles on Drosophila).

== The emc gene ==
The emc gene is located near the tip of the left arm of the 3rd Drosophila chromosome. It is about 4100 base pairs long, including two exons and one intron. Its FlyBase designation is Dmel_emc, and its location is at 3L:749,406..753,505 [+]. 86 alleles have been reported.

== Emc interactions with other proteins ==
The Emc protein has a helix-loop-helix protein domain without the basic region, making it unable to bind to DNA and act as a transcription factor. It does, however, have the ability to bind other basic helix-loop-helix domain-containing proteins, such as the products of the achaete-scute complex (ac-s), to form dimers that inactivate the target protein, which is usually a transcription factor. In this way, the Emc protein can have an effect on the gene expression of many genes during Drosophila development.

== Emc in neural development ==
The extra sensory organs (SOs) in Drosophila arise from cell-clusters known as sensory mother cells (SMCs). Once an imaginal disc cell has been selected to become an SMC, it will go on to mature into an SO. Therefore, the regulation of which imaginal disc cells become SMCs is vital to neural development. This transition is caused by the Da and AS-C genes, which are transcription factors with the basic helix-loop-helix (bHLH) domains. The Da protein (made by the daughterless gene) is a Class I HLH protein, meaning it has generalized distribution, whereas the AS-C proteins (made by the as-c gene complex) are Class II HLH proteins, meaning they have restricted distribution. The Emc protein itself is a Class V HLH protein due to its lack of the basic region and consequential inability to bind DNA. The interaction between Da or AS-C proteins with Emc to form dimers renders them inactive as transcription factors. It is the interplay between concentrations of Da, AS-C, and Emc proteins that determines whether or not a cell will become an SMC, and later on an SO. In this way, "Emc provides positional information for SO patterning."
The levels of each of these proneural proteins is likely to be regulated by the Notch signaling pathway, as the lack of Notch causes an excess of neural cells while "constitutive Notch signaling...suppresses neural differentiation." Notch has been shown to mediate lateral specification of proneural cell-clusters by restricting the expression of AS-C proteins to only the neuroblast, while causing the surrounding dermoblast cells to cease expression of the as-c complex.

== Emc in sex determination ==
Sex in Drosophila is determined in part by the Sex lethal (Sxl) gene; more precisely, it is turned 'on' in females and 'off' in males. Whether or not this gene will be expressed is determined by the ratio of sex chromosomes (X-chromosomes) to autosomal chromosomes. The fly embryo assesses this ratio by the difference between concentrations of the scute gene product, which is on the X-chromosome, and the emc gene product, which is on an autosomal chromosome. Specifically, Emc proteins inactivate the Sc protein (a transcription factor) and stop transcription of genes on the X-chromosome. As females have twice the amount of Sc as males, they can overcome this obstacle and express the Sxl gene.

== Similarity to vertebrate genes ==
Early support for the role of emc came from the mouse Inhibitor of differentiation (Id) gene, which negatively regulates myogenesis by forming a heterodimer with the MyoD protein and therefore inhibiting its abilities as a transcription factor. Similar processes are also likely to exist in other mammals.
