= TLE2 =

Protein-coding gene in the species Homo sapiens

Identifiers
- Aliases: TLE2, ESG, ESG2, GRG2, transducin like enhancer of split 2, TLE family member 2, transcriptional corepressor
- External IDs: OMIM: 601041; MGI: 104635; GeneCards: TLE2

Gene location (Human)
Chr.	Chromosome 19 (human)
Band	19p13.3	Start	2,997,639 bp
Band	19p13.3	End	3,047,635 bp

Gene location (Mouse)
Chr.	Chromosome 10 (mouse)
Band	10|10 C1	Start	81,410,395 bp
Band	10|10 C1	End	81,426,679 bp
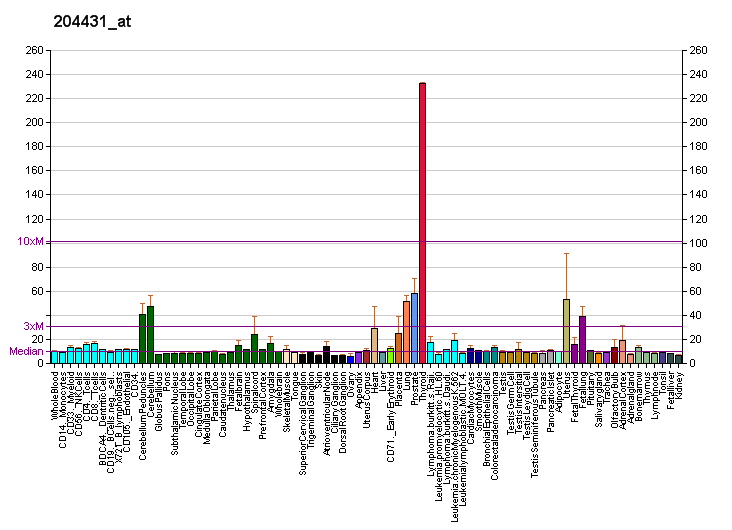

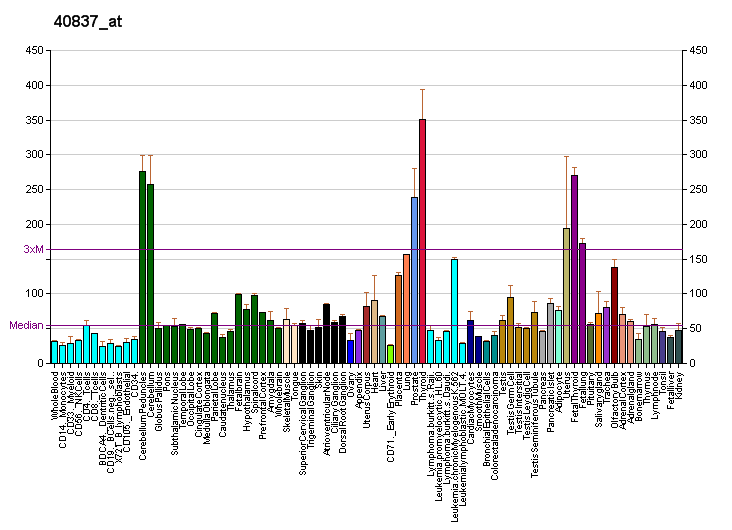
RNA expression pattern
Bgee	Human / Mouse (ortholog); Top expressed in: cerebellar hemisphere; right hemisphere of cerebellum; cerebellar vermis; tibial nerve; right lobe of thyroid gland; left lobe of thyroid gland; left uterine tube; parotid gland; apex of heart; sural nerve / Top expressed in: cerebellar cortex; neural layer of retina; medullary collecting duct; lobe of cerebellum; cerebellar vermis; primary visual cortex; internal carotid artery; adrenal gland; superior frontal gyrus; molar; More reference expression data
BioGPS	More reference expression data
Gene ontology
Molecular function	protein binding; transcription corepressor activity
Cellular component	nucleus; focal adhesion; nucleoplasm; extracellular space; nuclear body; transcription regulator complex
Biological process	animal organ morphogenesis; negative regulation of transcription, DNA-templated; regulation of transcription, DNA-templated; Wnt signaling pathway; negative regulation of canonical Wnt signaling pathway; transcription, DNA-templated; signal transduction; beta-catenin-TCF complex assembly
Sources:Amigo / QuickGO
Orthologs
Databases	NCBI: entry; OMA: entry
Species	Human	Mouse
Entrez	7089	21886
Ensembl	ENSG00000065717	ENSMUSG00000034771
UniProt	Q04725	Q9WVB2
RefSeq (mRNA)	NM_001144761; NM_001144762; NM_001300846; NM_003260	NM_001252401; NM_019725
RefSeq (protein)	NP_001138233; NP_001138234; NP_001287775; NP_003251	NP_001239330; NP_062699
Location (UCSC)	Chr 19: 3 – 3.05 Mb	Chr 10: 81.41 – 81.43 Mb
PubMed search
- Wikidata
View/Edit Human	View/Edit Mouse

Transducin-like enhancer protein 2 is a protein that in humans is encoded by the TLE2 gene.

== Interactions ==
TLE2 has been shown to interact with TLE1 and HES1.
