= MXD3 =

Protein-coding gene in the species Homo sapiens

Identifiers
- Aliases: MXD3, BHLHC13, MAD3, MYX, MAX dimerization protein 3
- External IDs: OMIM: 609450; MGI: 104987; GeneCards: MXD3

Gene location (Human)
Chr.	Chromosome 5 (human)
Band	5q35.3	Start	177,301,461 bp
Band	5q35.3	End	177,312,757 bp

Gene location (Mouse)
Chr.	Chromosome 13 (mouse)
Band	13 B1|13 29.8 cM	Start	55,472,981 bp
Band	13 B1|13 29.8 cM	End	55,477,636 bp
RNA expression pattern
Bgee	Human / Mouse (ortholog); Top expressed in: ventricular zone; granulocyte; monocyte; blood; ganglionic eminence; spleen; bone marrow; mucosa of transverse colon; trabecular bone; gastric mucosa / Top expressed in: lumbar spinal ganglion; fossa; ascending aorta; internal carotid artery; aortic valve; thymus; crypt of lieberkuhn of small intestine; external carotid artery; condyle; ventricular zone; More reference expression data
BioGPS	n/a
Gene ontology
Molecular function	DNA binding; protein binding; protein dimerization activity; RNA polymerase II transcription regulatory region sequence-specific DNA binding; DNA-binding transcription repressor activity, RNA polymerase II-specific; DNA-binding transcription factor activity, RNA polymerase II-specific
Cellular component	nucleus; RNA polymerase II transcription regulator complex
Biological process	negative regulation of transcription, DNA-templated; regulation of transcription, DNA-templated; transcription, DNA-templated; negative regulation of transcription by RNA polymerase II
Sources:Amigo / QuickGO
Orthologs
Databases	NCBI: entry; OMA: entry
Species	Human	Mouse
Entrez	83463	17121
Ensembl	ENSG00000213347	ENSMUSG00000021485
UniProt	Q9BW11	Q80US8
RefSeq (mRNA)	NM_031300; NM_001142935; NM_001394986; NM_001394987	NM_016662
RefSeq (protein)	NP_001136407; NP_112590; NP_112590.1	NP_057871
Location (UCSC)	Chr 5: 177.3 – 177.31 Mb	Chr 13: 55.47 – 55.48 Mb
PubMed search
- Wikidata
View/Edit Human	View/Edit Mouse

MAX dimerization protein 3 is a protein that in humans is encoded by the MXD3 gene located on Chromosome 5.

MXD3 is a basic helix-loop-helix protein belonging to a subfamily of MAX-interacting proteins. This protein competes with MYC for binding to MAX to form a sequence-specific DNA-binding complex. MXD3 is a transcriptional repressor that is specifically expressed during S phase of the cell cycle. The protein is implicated in both normal neural development and in the development of brain cancer. In medulloblastoma cells, MXD3 binds E-box sequences, leading to increased cell proliferation at moderate MXD3 levels but increased cell death and apoptosis at higher expression levels.
