= TAL2 =

Protein-coding gene in the species Homo sapiens

Identifiers
- Aliases: TAL2, TAL bHLH transcription factor 2
- External IDs: OMIM: 186855; MGI: 99540; GeneCards: TAL2

Gene location (Human)
Chr.	Chromosome 9 (human)
Band	9q31.2	Start	105,662,457 bp
Band	9q31.2	End	105,663,124 bp

Gene location (Mouse)
Chr.	Chromosome 4 (mouse)
Band	4 B2|4 28.75 cM	Start	53,779,705 bp
Band	4 B2|4 28.75 cM	End	53,788,712 bp
RNA expression pattern
Bgee	Human / Mouse (ortholog); Top expressed in: Skeletal muscle tissue of rectus abdominis; Skeletal muscle tissue of biceps brachii; vastus lateralis muscle; buccal mucosa cell; muscle of thigh; deltoid muscle; renal medulla; ganglionic eminence; ventricular zone; gastrocnemius muscle / Top expressed in: pineal gland; embryo; granulocyte; temporal muscle; spermatid; hair follicle; seminiferous tubule; muscle of thigh; skeletal muscle tissue; esophagus; More reference expression data
BioGPS	n/a
Gene ontology
Molecular function	DNA binding; RNA polymerase II transcription regulatory region sequence-specific DNA binding; protein binding; protein dimerization activity; DNA-binding transcription factor activity, RNA polymerase II-specific
Cellular component	nucleus
Biological process	regulation of transcription, DNA-templated; post-embryonic development; transcription, DNA-templated; midbrain development; multicellular organism growth; thalamus development; regulation of transcription by RNA polymerase II
Sources:Amigo / QuickGO
Orthologs
Databases	NCBI: entry; OMA: entry
Species	Human	Mouse
Entrez	6887	21350
Ensembl	ENSG00000186051	ENSMUSG00000028417
UniProt	Q16559	Q62282
RefSeq (mRNA)	NM_005421	NM_009317
RefSeq (protein)	NP_005412	NP_033343
Location (UCSC)	Chr 9: 105.66 – 105.66 Mb	Chr 4: 53.78 – 53.79 Mb
PubMed search
- Wikidata
View/Edit Human	View/Edit Mouse

T-cell acute lymphocytic leukemia 2, also known as TAL2, is a protein which in humans is encoded by the TAL2 gene.

== Function ==
TAL2 is a member of the basic helix-loop-helix family of transcription factors.

== Clinical significance ==
Tumor-specific alterations of the TAL2 gene occurs in some patients with T-cell acute lymphoblastic leukemia (T-ALL).
