= TFAP4 =

Protein-coding gene in the species Homo sapiens

Identifiers
- Aliases: TFAP4, AP-4, bHLHc41, transcription factor AP-4 (activating enhancer binding protein 4), transcription factor AP-4
- External IDs: OMIM: 600743; MGI: 103239; GeneCards: TFAP4

Gene location (Human)
Chr.	Chromosome 16 (human)
Band	16p13.3	Start	4,257,186 bp
Band	16p13.3	End	4,273,075 bp

Gene location (Mouse)
Chr.	Chromosome 16 (mouse)
Band	16 A1|16 2.45 cM	Start	4,362,525 bp
Band	16 A1|16 2.45 cM	End	4,377,718 bp
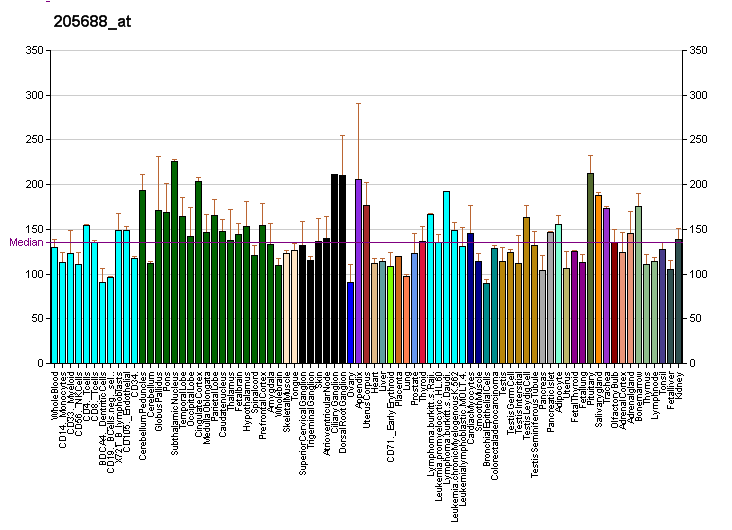
RNA expression pattern
Bgee	Human / Mouse (ortholog); Top expressed in: olfactory bulb; beta cell; vena cava; sural nerve; ganglionic eminence; cerebellar hemisphere; lateral nuclear group of thalamus; subthalamic nucleus; nasal epithelium; right hemisphere of cerebellum / Top expressed in: tail of embryo; genital tubercle; ventricular zone; yolk sac; epiblast; female urethra; muscle of thigh; lip; zygote; embryo; More reference expression data
BioGPS	More reference expression data
Gene ontology
Molecular function	sequence-specific DNA binding; RNA polymerase II cis-regulatory region sequence-specific DNA binding; protein homodimerization activity; protein dimerization activity; transcription coactivator activity; histone deacetylase binding; protein heterodimerization activity; transcription factor activity, RNA polymerase II distal enhancer sequence-specific binding; DNA-binding transcription activator activity, RNA polymerase II-specific; protein binding; DNA binding; E-box binding; DNA-binding transcription factor activity, RNA polymerase II-specific; DNA-binding transcription factor activity
Cellular component	transcription repressor complex; nucleus; mitochondrion
Biological process	negative regulation of cell population proliferation; negative regulation of cyclin-dependent protein serine/threonine kinase activity; transcription, DNA-templated; negative regulation of gene expression; DNA damage response, signal transduction by p53 class mediator resulting in transcription of p21 class mediator; cellular response to dexamethasone stimulus; negative regulation of DNA binding; positive regulation of cysteine-type endopeptidase activity involved in apoptotic signaling pathway; positive regulation of apoptotic process; positive regulation of transcription, DNA-templated; regulation of transcription, DNA-templated; positive regulation of transcription by RNA polymerase II; transcription by RNA polymerase II; negative regulation of transcription, DNA-templated; regulation of mitotic cell cycle phase transition; protein-containing complex assembly; regulation of transcription by RNA polymerase II
Sources:Amigo / QuickGO
Orthologs
Databases	NCBI: entry; OMA: entry
Species	Human	Mouse
Entrez	7023	83383
Ensembl	ENSG00000090447	ENSMUSG00000005718
UniProt	Q01664	Q9JIZ5
RefSeq (mRNA)	NM_003223	NM_031182
RefSeq (protein)	NP_003214	NP_112459
Location (UCSC)	Chr 16: 4.26 – 4.27 Mb	Chr 16: 4.36 – 4.38 Mb
PubMed search
- Wikidata
View/Edit Human	View/Edit Mouse

Transcription factor AP-4 (activating enhancer binding protein 4), also known as TFAP4, is a protein which in humans is encoded by the TFAP4 gene.

== Function ==
Transcription factor AP4 is a member of the basic helix-loop-helix (bHLH) transcription factors, which bind to the E-box sequence in the promoters of their target genes. AP-4 has been shown to act both as a repressor and an activator for different target genes.
