= HES5 =

Protein-coding gene in humans

Identifiers
- Aliases: HES5, bHLHb38, hes family bHLH transcription factor 5
- External IDs: OMIM: 607348; MGI: 104876; GeneCards: HES5

Gene location (Human)
Chr.	Chromosome 1 (human)
Band	1p36.32	Start	2,528,745 bp
Band	1p36.32	End	2,530,263 bp

Gene location (Mouse)
Chr.	Chromosome 4 (mouse)
Band	4 E2|4 86.01 cM	Start	155,045,380 bp
Band	4 E2|4 86.01 cM	End	155,046,828 bp
RNA expression pattern
Bgee	Human / Mouse (ortholog); Top expressed in: gonad; ventricular zone; ganglionic eminence; nucleus accumbens; amygdala; hypothalamus; apex of heart; anterior cingulate cortex; caudate nucleus; putamen / Top expressed in: medial ganglionic eminence; Rostral migratory stream; ventricular zone; somite; neural tube; substantia nigra; thin ascending limb of loop of Henle; supraoptic nucleus; olfactory bulb; lateral septal nucleus; More reference expression data
BioGPS	n/a
Gene ontology
Molecular function	DNA binding; protein dimerization activity; transcription factor binding; chromatin binding; DNA-binding transcription repressor activity, RNA polymerase II-specific; double-stranded DNA binding; DNA-binding transcription factor activity, RNA polymerase II-specific; RNA polymerase II transcription regulatory region sequence-specific DNA binding; transcription corepressor activity; sequence-specific DNA binding; sequence-specific double-stranded DNA binding
Cellular component	nucleoplasm; nucleus; cellular component
Biological process	Notch signaling pathway; auditory receptor cell fate determination; establishment of epithelial cell polarity; cell differentiation; negative regulation of astrocyte differentiation; regulation of inner ear auditory receptor cell differentiation; regulation of transcription, DNA-templated; negative regulation of neuron differentiation; inner ear receptor cell stereocilium organization; comma-shaped body morphogenesis; metanephric nephron tubule morphogenesis; chondrocyte differentiation; central nervous system myelination; negative regulation of transcription by RNA polymerase II; cell maturation; negative regulation of forebrain neuron differentiation; transcription, DNA-templated; nervous system development; negative regulation of stem cell differentiation; neuronal stem cell population maintenance; positive regulation of transcription, DNA-templated; multicellular organism development; glial cell fate commitment; telencephalon development; brain development; inner ear auditory receptor cell differentiation; cell adhesion; astrocyte differentiation; cartilage development; forebrain radial glial cell differentiation; regulation of myelination; negative regulation of oligodendrocyte differentiation; S-shaped body morphogenesis; neural tube development; neuron differentiation; positive regulation of cell population proliferation; positive regulation of BMP signaling pathway; negative regulation of pro-B cell differentiation; regulation of cell differentiation; smoothened signaling pathway; oligodendrocyte development; camera-type eye development; specification of loop of Henle identity; regulation of epithelial cell proliferation; negative regulation of transcription, DNA-templated; negative regulation of inner ear receptor cell differentiation; regulation of neurogenesis; positive regulation of receptor signaling pathway via JAK-STAT; positive regulation of Notch signaling pathway; positive regulation of transcription by RNA polymerase II; positive regulation of smooth muscle cell proliferation; positive regulation of tyrosine phosphorylation of STAT protein; protein-containing complex assembly; somitogenesis; central nervous system development; anterior/posterior pattern specification; negative regulation of inner ear auditory receptor cell differentiation
Sources:Amigo / QuickGO
Orthologs
Databases	NCBI: entry; OMA: entry
Species	Human	Mouse
Entrez	388585	15208
Ensembl	ENSG00000273529; ENSG00000197921	ENSMUSG00000048001
UniProt	Q5TA89	P70120
RefSeq (mRNA)	NM_001010926	NM_010419; NM_001370755
RefSeq (protein)	NP_001010926	NP_034549; NP_001357684
Location (UCSC)	Chr 1: 2.53 – 2.53 Mb	Chr 4: 155.05 – 155.05 Mb
PubMed search
- Wikidata
View/Edit Human	View/Edit Mouse

Transcription factor HES-5 is a protein that in humans is encoded by the HES5 gene.

HES5 regulates the development of the early brain by maintaining stem cell neural progenitors in the ventricular zone. HES5 expression significantly higher in squamous cervical carcinoma than in CIN as well as higher in CIN than normal cervical epithelia. Human HES5 gene binds to Notch receptor and expression of HES5 decreases during cartilage differentiation.
