= HEY2 =

Protein-coding gene in the species Homo sapiens

Identifiers
- Aliases: HEY2, CHF1, GRIDLOCK, GRL, HERP1, HESR2, HRT2, bHLHb32, hes related family bHLH transcription factor with YRPW motif 2
- External IDs: OMIM: 604674; MGI: 1341884; GeneCards: HEY2

Gene location (Human)
| Chr. | Chromosome 6 (human) |
| Band | 6q22.31 | Start | 125,747,664 bp |
| Band | 6q22.31 | End | 125,761,269 bp |

Gene location (Mouse)
| Chr. | Chromosome 10 (mouse) |
| Band | 10|10 A4 | Start | 30,708,355 bp |
| Band | 10|10 A4 | End | 30,718,797 bp |
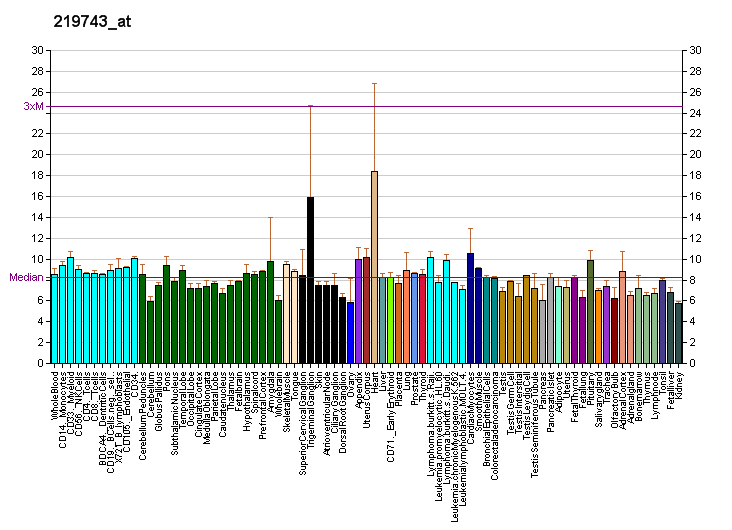
RNA expression pattern
| Bgee | Human / Mouse (ortholog); Top expressed in: popliteal artery; tibial arteries; right ventricle; myocardium of left ventricle; right coronary artery; oocyte; Descending thoracic aorta; secondary oocyte; right uterine tube; corpus epididymis / Top expressed in: trigeminal ganglion; ascending aorta; inner enamel epithelium; left ventricle; tunica media of zone of aorta; cumulus cell; primordial ventricle; semi-lunar valve; aortic valve; lumbar spinal ganglion; More reference expression data |
| BioGPS | More reference expression data |
Gene ontology
| Molecular function | microsatellite binding; sequence-specific DNA binding; DNA binding; protein dimerization activity; protein homodimerization activity; DNA-binding transcription factor activity; transcription factor binding; histone deacetylase binding; RNA polymerase II general transcription initiation factor activity; protein binding; protein heterodimerization activity; DNA-binding transcription factor activity, RNA polymerase II-specific; RNA polymerase II transcription regulatory region sequence-specific DNA binding; DNA-binding transcription activator activity, RNA polymerase II-specific; DNA-binding transcription repressor activity, RNA polymerase II-specific; transcription corepressor activity; sequence-specific double-stranded DNA binding |
| Cellular component | cytoplasm; transcription repressor complex; Sin3 complex; nucleoplasm; nucleus |
| Biological process | dorsal aorta morphogenesis; cardiac vascular smooth muscle cell development; cochlea development; pattern specification process; cell fate commitment; pulmonary valve morphogenesis; regulation of inner ear auditory receptor cell differentiation; negative regulation of transcription from RNA polymerase II promoter involved in smooth muscle cell differentiation; regulation of transcription, DNA-templated; heart trabecula formation; tricuspid valve morphogenesis; regulation of vasculogenesis; pulmonary artery morphogenesis; cardiac septum morphogenesis; negative regulation of cardiac vascular smooth muscle cell differentiation; muscular septum morphogenesis; ventricular septum morphogenesis; protein-DNA complex assembly; cardiac muscle hypertrophy; outflow tract morphogenesis; ascending aorta morphogenesis; cardiac left ventricle morphogenesis; labyrinthine layer blood vessel development; negative regulation of transcription by RNA polymerase II; coronary vasculature morphogenesis; smooth muscle cell differentiation; negative regulation of gene expression; endocardial cushion to mesenchymal transition involved in heart valve formation; transcription, DNA-templated; ventricular trabecula myocardium morphogenesis; positive regulation of heart rate; vasculogenesis; multicellular organism development; atrial septum morphogenesis; negative regulation of cardiac muscle cell apoptotic process; development of the heart; arterial endothelial cell differentiation; positive regulation of cardiac muscle cell proliferation; blood vessel development; cardiac muscle hypertrophy in response to stress; umbilical cord morphogenesis; negative regulation of transcription regulatory region DNA binding; mesenchymal cell development; artery development; regulation of gene expression; negative regulation of transcription by transcription factor localization; negative regulation of transcription initiation from RNA polymerase II promoter; vascular associated smooth muscle cell development; anterior/posterior axis specification; tricuspid valve formation; negative regulation of transcription, DNA-templated; cardiac ventricle morphogenesis; cardiac right ventricle morphogenesis; ventricular cardiac muscle cell development; atrioventricular valve development; positive regulation of transcription by RNA polymerase II; negative regulation of Notch signaling pathway; cardiac epithelial to mesenchymal transition; Notch signaling involved in heart development; Notch signaling pathway; positive regulation of transcription, DNA-templated; cell differentiation; regulation of neurogenesis; aortic valve morphogenesis; epithelial to mesenchymal transition involved in endocardial cushion formation; positive regulation of gene expression; negative regulation of biomineral tissue development; anterior/posterior pattern specification; circulatory system development |
Sources:Amigo / QuickGO
Orthologs
| Databases | NCBI: entry; OMA: entry |
| Species | Human | Mouse |
| Entrez | 23493 | 15214 |
| Ensembl | ENSG00000135547 | ENSMUSG00000019789 |
| UniProt | Q9UBP5; Q5TF93 | Q9QUS4 |
| RefSeq (mRNA) | NM_012259 | NM_013904 |
| RefSeq (protein) | NP_036391 | NP_038932 |
| Location (UCSC) | Chr 6: 125.75 – 125.76 Mb | Chr 10: 30.71 – 30.72 Mb |
| PubMed search |
- Wikidata
| View/Edit Human | View/Edit Mouse |

Hairy/enhancer-of-split related with YRPW motif protein 2 (HEY2) also known as cardiovascular helix-loop-helix factor 1 (CHF1) is a protein that in humans is encoded by the HEY2 gene.

This protein is a type of transcription factor that belongs to the hairy and enhancer of split-related (HESR) family of basic helix-loop-helix (bHLH)-type transcription factors. It forms homo- or hetero-dimers that localize to the nucleus and interact with a histone deacetylase complex to repress transcription. During embryonic development, this mechanism is used to control the number of cells that develop into cardiac progenitor cells and myocardial cells. The relationship is inversely related, so as the number of cells that express the Hey2 gene increases, the more CHF1 is present to repress transcription and the number of cells that take on a myocardial fate decreases.

== Expression ==
The expression of the Hey2 gene is induced by the Notch signaling pathway. In this mechanism, adjacent cells bind via transmembrane notch receptors. Two similar and redundant genes in mouse are required for embryonic cardiovascular development, and are also implicated in neurogenesis and somitogenesis. Alternatively spliced transcript variants have been found, but their biological validity has not been determined.

== Knockout studies ==
The Hey2 gene is involved with the formation of the cardiovascular system and especially the heart itself. Although studies have not been conducted about the effects of a malfunction in Hey2 expression in humans, experiments done with mice suggest this gene could be responsible for a number of heart defects. Using a gene knockout technique, scientists inactivated both the Hey1 and Hey2 genes of mice. The loss of these two genes resulted in death of the embryo 9.5 days after conception. It was found that the developing hearts of these embryos lacked most structural formations which resulted in massive hemorrhage. When only the Hey1 gene was knocked out, no apparent phenotypic changes occurred, suggesting that these two genes carry similar and redundant information for the development of the heart.

== Clinical significance ==
Common variants of SCN5A, SCN10A, and HEY2 (this gene) are associated with Brugada syndrome.

== Interactions ==
HEY2 has been shown to interact with Sirtuin 1 and Nuclear receptor co-repressor 1.
