= HEY1 =

Protein-coding gene in the species Homo sapiens

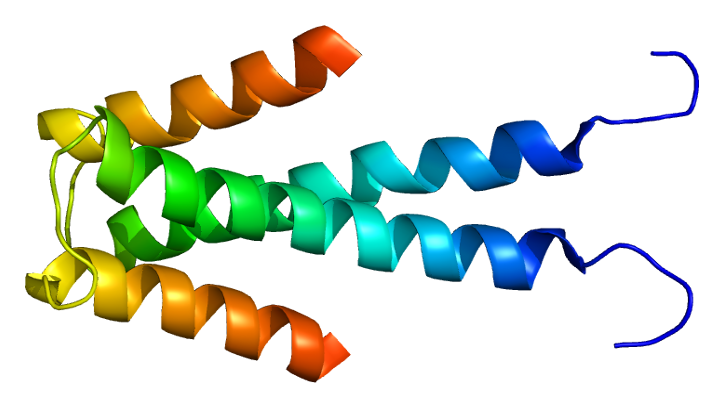

Identifiers
- Aliases: HEY1, BHLHb31, CHF2, HERP2, HESR1, HRT-1, OAF1, hHRT1, hes related family bHLH transcription factor with YRPW motif 1, NERP2
- External IDs: OMIM: 602953; MGI: 1341800; GeneCards: HEY1
Available structures
PDB	Ortholog search: PDBe RCSB
PDB	List of PDB id codes 2DB7

Gene location (Human)
Chr.	Chromosome 8 (human)
Band	8q21.13	Start	79,762,371 bp
Band	8q21.13	End	79,767,857 bp

Gene location (Mouse)
Chr.	Chromosome 3 (mouse)
Band	3 A1|3 2.15 cM	Start	8,728,419 bp
Band	3 A1|3 2.15 cM	End	8,732,316 bp
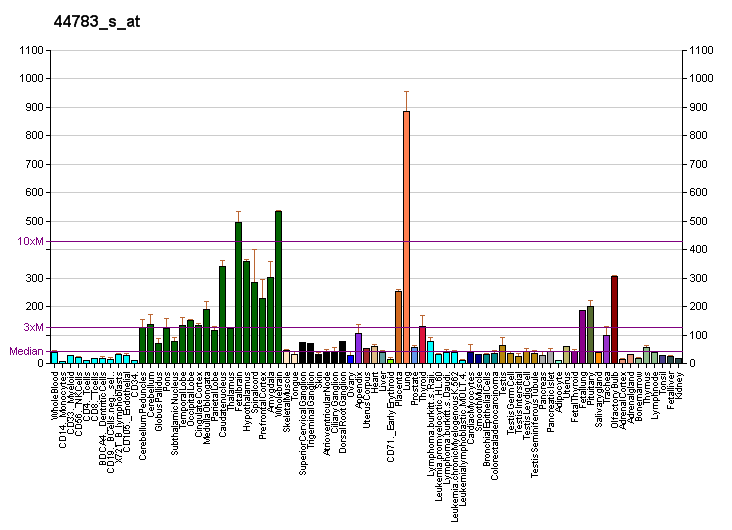

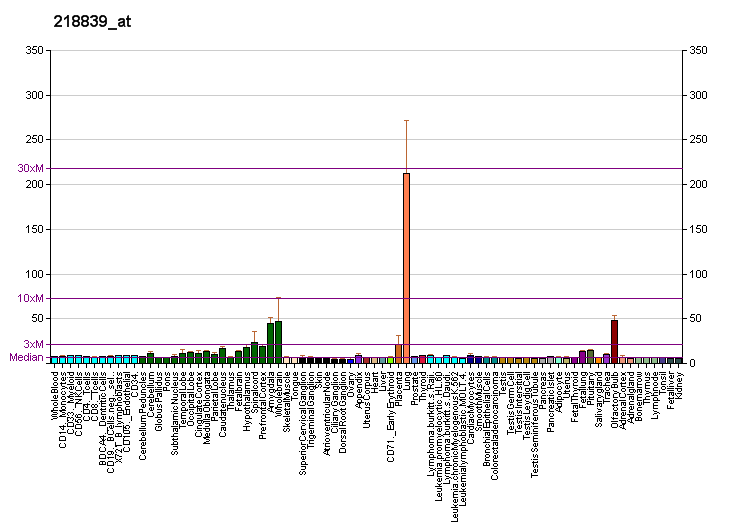
RNA expression pattern
Bgee	Human / Mouse (ortholog); Top expressed in: endothelial cell; Brodmann area 23; optic nerve; middle temporal gyrus; dorsal motor nucleus of vagus nerve; spinal ganglia; trigeminal ganglion; internal globus pallidus; visceral pleura; mucosa of paranasal sinus / Top expressed in: pharyngeal groove; molar; ventricular zone; aortic valve; right lung lobe; nasal epithelium; olfactory epithelium; renal corpuscle; tail of embryo; left lung; More reference expression data
BioGPS	More reference expression data
Gene ontology
Molecular function	microsatellite binding; DNA binding; protein dimerization activity; DNA-binding transcription factor activity; transcription factor binding; RNA polymerase II general transcription initiation factor activity; protein binding; DNA-binding transcription factor activity, RNA polymerase II-specific; RNA polymerase II transcription regulatory region sequence-specific DNA binding; DNA-binding transcription activator activity, RNA polymerase II-specific; DNA-binding transcription repressor activity, RNA polymerase II-specific; transcription corepressor activity; sequence-specific DNA binding; sequence-specific double-stranded DNA binding
Cellular component	cytoplasm; nucleoplasm; nucleus
Biological process	dorsal aorta morphogenesis; pulmonary valve morphogenesis; negative regulation of transcription from RNA polymerase II promoter involved in smooth muscle cell differentiation; regulation of transcription, DNA-templated; heart trabecula formation; regulation of vasculogenesis; cardiac septum morphogenesis; ventricular septum morphogenesis; labyrinthine layer blood vessel development; negative regulation of transcription by RNA polymerase II; transcription, DNA-templated; endocardial cushion morphogenesis; multicellular organism development; atrioventricular valve formation; arterial endothelial cell differentiation; cellular response to glucocorticoid stimulus; umbilical cord morphogenesis; negative regulation of transcription regulatory region DNA binding; angiogenesis; negative regulation of transcription, DNA-templated; cardiac ventricle morphogenesis; positive regulation of transcription by RNA polymerase II; negative regulation of Notch signaling pathway; cardiac epithelial to mesenchymal transition; Notch signaling involved in heart development; Notch signaling pathway; positive regulation of transcription, DNA-templated; blood vessel development; development of the heart; cell differentiation; regulation of neurogenesis; positive regulation of gene expression; negative regulation of biomineral tissue development; anterior/posterior pattern specification; negative regulation of neuron differentiation; circulatory system development
Sources:Amigo / QuickGO
Orthologs
Databases	NCBI: entry; OMA: entry
Species	Human	Mouse
Entrez	23462	15213
Ensembl	ENSG00000164683	ENSMUSG00000040289
UniProt	Q9Y5J3	Q9WV93; Q9QUM5
RefSeq (mRNA)	NM_012258; NM_001040708; NM_001282851	NM_010423
RefSeq (protein)	NP_001035798; NP_001269780; NP_036390	NP_034553
Location (UCSC)	Chr 8: 79.76 – 79.77 Mb	Chr 3: 8.73 – 8.73 Mb
PubMed search
- Wikidata
View/Edit Human	View/Edit Mouse

Hairy/enhancer-of-split related with YRPW motif protein 1 is a protein that in humans is encoded by the HEY1 gene.

== Function ==
This gene encodes a nuclear protein belonging to the hairy and enhancer of split-related (HESR) family of basic helix-loop-helix (bHLH)-type transcriptional repressors. Expression of this gene is induced by the Notch and c-Jun signal transduction pathways. Two similar and redundant genes in mouse are required for embryonic cardiovascular development, and are also implicated in neurogenesis and somitogenesis. Alternative splicing results in multiple transcript variants.

== Role in disease ==
HEY1::NCOA2 fusion which may arise via a small deletion del(8)(q13.3q21.1) is highly specific for the diagnosis of mesenchymal chondrosarcoma.
