= NHLH1 =

Protein-coding gene in humans

Identifiers
- Aliases: NHLH1, HEN1, NSCL, NSCL1, bHLHa35, nescient helix-loop-helix 1
- External IDs: OMIM: 162360; MGI: 98481; GeneCards: NHLH1

Gene location (Human)
Chr.	Chromosome 1 (human)
Band	1q23.2	Start	160,367,071 bp
Band	1q23.2	End	160,372,846 bp

Gene location (Mouse)
Chr.	Chromosome 1 (mouse)
Band	1 H3|1 79.54 cM	Start	171,879,859 bp
Band	1 H3|1 79.54 cM	End	171,885,140 bp
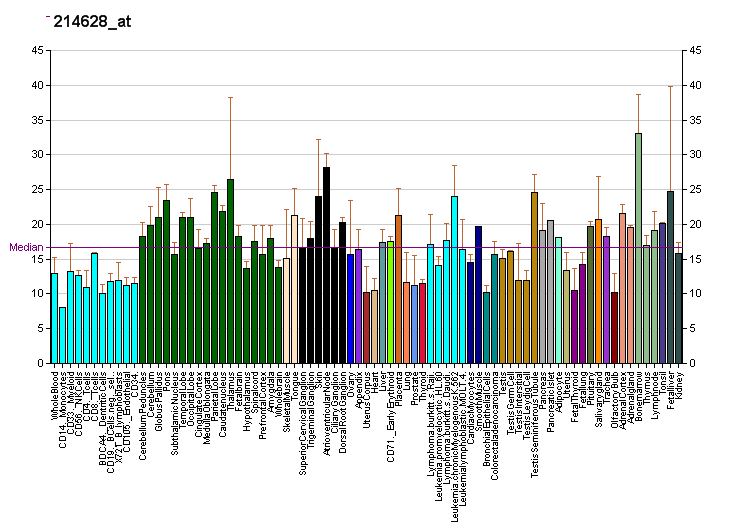
RNA expression pattern
Bgee	Human / Mouse (ortholog); Top expressed in: ganglionic eminence; ventricular zone; buccal mucosa cell; putamen; granulocyte; caudate nucleus; prefrontal cortex; nucleus accumbens; superior frontal gyrus; primary visual cortex / Top expressed in: gray matter layer of cerebellum; urethra; female urethra; male urethra; ganglion of neuraxis; ventricular zone; respiratory epithelium; olfactory epithelium; nasal placode; Jacobson's organ; More reference expression data
BioGPS	More reference expression data
Gene ontology
Molecular function	DNA-binding transcription activator activity, RNA polymerase II-specific; DNA binding; RNA polymerase II transcription regulatory region sequence-specific DNA binding; protein dimerization activity; DNA-binding transcription factor activity, RNA polymerase II-specific; protein binding
Cellular component	nucleus
Biological process	multicellular organism development; central nervous system development; cell differentiation; regulation of transcription, DNA-templated; transcription, DNA-templated; positive regulation of transcription by RNA polymerase II; transcription by RNA polymerase II; regulation of transcription by RNA polymerase II
Sources:Amigo / QuickGO
Orthologs
Databases	NCBI: entry; OMA: entry
Species	Human	Mouse
Entrez	4807	18071
Ensembl	ENSG00000171786	ENSMUSG00000051251
UniProt	Q02575; Q5T203	Q02576
RefSeq (mRNA)	NM_005598	NM_010916
RefSeq (protein)	NP_005589; NP_005589.1	NP_035046
Location (UCSC)	Chr 1: 160.37 – 160.37 Mb	Chr 1: 171.88 – 171.89 Mb
PubMed search
- Wikidata
View/Edit Human	View/Edit Mouse

Helix-loop-helix protein 1 is a protein that in humans is encoded by the NHLH1 gene.

The helix-loop-helix (HLH) proteins are a family of putative transcription factors, some of which have been shown to play an important role in growth and development of a wide variety of tissues and species. Four members of this family have been clearly implicated in tumorigenesis via their involvement in chromosomal translocations in lymphoid tumors: MYC (MIM 190080), LYL1 (MIM 151440), E2A (MIM 147141), and SCL (MIM 187040).[supplied by OMIM]
