= Hes family bHLH transcription factor 2 =

Protein found in humans

HES2

Identifiers
- Aliases: HES2, bHLHb40, hes family bHLH transcription factor 2
- External IDs: OMIM: 609970; MGI: 1098624; GeneCards: HES2

Gene location (Human)
Chr.	Chromosome 1 (human)
Band	1p36.31	Start	6,412,418 bp
Band	1p36.31	End	6,424,670 bp

Gene location (Mouse)
Chr.	Chromosome 4 (mouse)
Band	4 E2|4 82.92 cM	Start	152,243,324 bp
Band	4 E2|4 82.92 cM	End	152,246,926 bp
RNA expression pattern
Bgee	Human / Mouse (ortholog); Top expressed in: mucosa of esophagus; mucosa of transverse colon; buccal mucosa cell; placenta; skin of abdomen; gingival epithelium; skin of leg; vagina; right uterine tube; olfactory zone of nasal mucosa / Top expressed in: embryo; lip; jejunum; right kidney; proximal tubule; duodenum; yolk sac; Ileal epithelium; esophagus; lens; More reference expression data
BioGPS	n/a
Gene ontology
Molecular function	DNA binding; double-stranded DNA binding; transcription factor binding; protein dimerization activity; RNA polymerase II cis-regulatory region sequence-specific DNA binding; DNA-binding transcription repressor activity, RNA polymerase II-specific; DNA-binding transcription factor activity, RNA polymerase II-specific; RNA polymerase II transcription regulatory region sequence-specific DNA binding; transcription corepressor activity; sequence-specific DNA binding; sequence-specific double-stranded DNA binding
Cellular component	nucleus
Biological process	negative regulation of transcription, DNA-templated; regulation of transcription, DNA-templated; transcription, DNA-templated; negative regulation of transcription by RNA polymerase II; somitogenesis; Notch signaling pathway; cell differentiation; regulation of neurogenesis; anterior/posterior pattern specification
Sources:Amigo / QuickGO
Orthologs
Databases	NCBI: entry; OMA: entry
Species	Human	Mouse
Entrez	54626	15206
Ensembl	ENSG00000069812	ENSMUSG00000028940
UniProt	Q9Y543	O54792
RefSeq (mRNA)	NM_019089	NM_001301805; NM_008236
RefSeq (protein)	NP_061962	NP_001288734; NP_032262
Location (UCSC)	Chr 1: 6.41 – 6.42 Mb	Chr 4: 152.24 – 152.25 Mb
PubMed search
- Wikidata
View/Edit Human	View/Edit Mouse

Hes family bHLH transcription factor 2 is a protein that in humans is encoded by the HES2 gene.
