= HES6 =

Protein-coding gene in the species Homo sapiens

Identifiers
- Aliases: HES6, C-HAIRY1, HES-6, bHLHb41, bHLHc23, hes family bHLH transcription factor 6
- External IDs: OMIM: 610331; MGI: 1859852; GeneCards: HES6

Gene location (Human)
| Chr. | Chromosome 2 (human) |
| Band | 2q37.3 | Start | 238,238,267 bp |
| Band | 2q37.3 | End | 238,240,662 bp |

Gene location (Mouse)
| Chr. | Chromosome 1 (mouse) |
| Band | 1|1 D | Start | 91,339,205 bp |
| Band | 1|1 D | End | 91,341,760 bp |
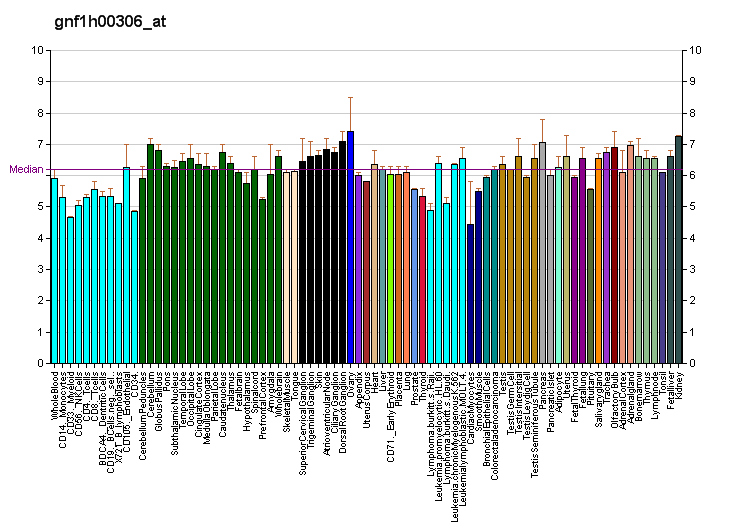
RNA expression pattern
| Bgee | Human / Mouse (ortholog); Top expressed in: ganglionic eminence; ventricular zone; secondary oocyte; C1 segment; mucosa of transverse colon; anterior pituitary; Brodmann area 9; primary visual cortex; cingulate gyrus; anterior cingulate cortex / Top expressed in: ventricular zone; fossa; right kidney; internal carotid artery; adrenal gland; saccule; ganglionic eminence; left lobe of liver; Paneth cell; proximal tubule; More reference expression data |
| BioGPS | More reference expression data |
Gene ontology
| Molecular function | DNA binding; transcription factor binding; RNA polymerase II transcription regulatory region sequence-specific DNA binding; protein dimerization activity; DNA-binding transcription repressor activity, RNA polymerase II-specific; DNA-binding transcription factor activity; transcription coregulator activity; DNA-binding transcription factor activity, RNA polymerase II-specific; transcription corepressor activity; sequence-specific DNA binding; sequence-specific double-stranded DNA binding |
| Cellular component | nucleus; transcription regulator complex |
| Biological process | regulation of transcription by RNA polymerase II; multicellular organism development; cell differentiation; negative regulation of transcription by RNA polymerase II; transcription, DNA-templated; nervous system development; regulation of transcription, DNA-templated; somitogenesis; Notch signaling pathway; regulation of neurogenesis; anterior/posterior pattern specification |
Sources:Amigo / QuickGO
Orthologs
| Databases | NCBI: entry; OMA: entry |
| Species | Human | Mouse |
| Entrez | 55502 | 55927 |
| Ensembl | ENSG00000144485 | ENSMUSG00000067071 |
| UniProt | Q96HZ4 | Q9JHE6 |
| RefSeq (mRNA) | NM_018645; NM_001142853; NM_001282434 | NM_019479; NM_001360899; NM_001360900 |
| RefSeq (protein) | NP_001136325; NP_001269363; NP_061115 | NP_062352; NP_001347828; NP_001347829 |
| Location (UCSC) | Chr 2: 238.24 – 238.24 Mb | Chr 1: 91.34 – 91.34 Mb |
| PubMed search |
- Wikidata
| View/Edit Human | View/Edit Mouse |

Transcription cofactor HES-6 is a protein that in humans is encoded by the HES6 gene.

== Interactions ==
HES6 has been shown to interact with TLE1.
