= ATOH1 =

Protein-coding gene in the species Homo sapiens

Identifiers
- Aliases: ATOH1, ATH1, HATH1, MATH-1, bHLHa14, atonal bHLH transcription factor 1
- External IDs: OMIM: 601461; MGI: 104654; GeneCards: ATOH1

Gene location (Human)
Chr.	Chromosome 4 (human)
Band	4q22.2	Start	93,828,753 bp
Band	4q22.2	End	93,830,964 bp

Gene location (Mouse)
Chr.	Chromosome 6 (mouse)
Band	6 C1|6 30.03 cM	Start	64,706,109 bp
Band	6 C1|6 30.03 cM	End	64,708,229 bp
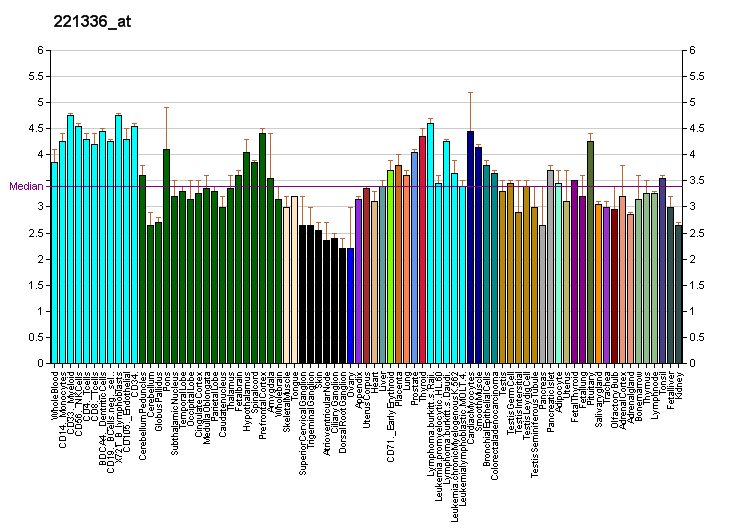
RNA expression pattern
Bgee	Human / Mouse (ortholog); Top expressed in: mucosa of transverse colon; rectum; mucosa of sigmoid colon; duodenum; jejunal mucosa; epithelium of colon; appendix; muscle tissue; smooth muscle tissue; muscle layer of sigmoid colon / Top expressed in: rhombic lip; crypt of lieberkuhn of small intestine; left colon; Paneth cell; vestibular sensory epithelium; intestinal villus; jejunum; ileum; urethra; male urethra; More reference expression data
BioGPS	More reference expression data
Gene ontology
Molecular function	DNA binding; sequence-specific DNA binding; protein dimerization activity; DNA-binding transcription factor activity; DNA-binding transcription activator activity, RNA polymerase II-specific; RNA polymerase II cis-regulatory region sequence-specific DNA binding; chromatin DNA binding; DNA-binding transcription factor activity, RNA polymerase II-specific
Cellular component	nucleus
Biological process	Notch signaling pathway; regulation of neuron differentiation; auditory receptor cell fate determination; cell differentiation; positive regulation of inner ear auditory receptor cell differentiation; regulation of transcription, DNA-templated; positive regulation of inner ear receptor cell differentiation; negative regulation of apoptotic process; neuron migration; auditory receptor cell fate specification; transcription, DNA-templated; nervous system development; axon guidance; multicellular organism development; central nervous system development; brain development; inner ear auditory receptor cell differentiation; inner ear morphogenesis; positive regulation of neuron differentiation; neuron differentiation; cerebral cortex development; inner ear development; positive regulation of transcription by RNA polymerase II; transcription by RNA polymerase II
Sources:Amigo / QuickGO
Orthologs
Databases	NCBI: entry; OMA: entry
Species	Human	Mouse
Entrez	474	11921
Ensembl	ENSG00000172238	ENSMUSG00000073043
UniProt	Q92858	P48985
RefSeq (mRNA)	NM_005172	NM_007500
RefSeq (protein)	NP_005163	NP_031526
Location (UCSC)	Chr 4: 93.83 – 93.83 Mb	Chr 6: 64.71 – 64.71 Mb
PubMed search
- Wikidata
View/Edit Human	View/Edit Mouse

Protein atonal homolog 1 is a protein that in humans is encoded by the ATOH1 gene.

== Function ==
This protein belongs to the basic helix-loop-helix (BHLH) family of transcription factors. It activates E-box dependent transcription along with TCF3 (E47). ATOH1 is required for the formation of both neural and non-neural cell types. Using genetic deletion in mice, Atoh1 has been shown to be essential for formation of cerebellar granule neurons, inner ear hair cells, spinal cord interneurons, Merkel cells of the skin, and intestinal secretory cells (goblet, enteroendocrine, and Paneth cells). ATOH1 is a mammalian homolog of the Drosophila melanogaster gene atonal. ATOH1 is considered part of the Notch signaling pathway.

In 2009, ATOH1 was identified as a tumor suppressor gene.
