= ID2 =

Protein-coding gene in the species Homo sapiens

Identifiers
- Aliases: ID2, GIG8, ID2A, ID2H, bHLHb26, inhibitor of DNA binding 2, HLH protein, inhibitor of DNA binding 2
- External IDs: OMIM: 600386; MGI: 96397; GeneCards: ID2
Available structures
PDB	Ortholog search: PDBe RCSB
PDB	List of PDB id codes 4AYA

Gene location (Human)
Chr.	Chromosome 2 (human)
Band	2p25.1	Start	8,678,845 bp
Band	2p25.1	End	8,684,461 bp

Gene location (Mouse)
Chr.	Chromosome 12 (mouse)
Band	12 A1.3|12 8.57 cM	Start	25,143,798 bp
Band	12 A1.3|12 8.57 cM	End	25,147,139 bp
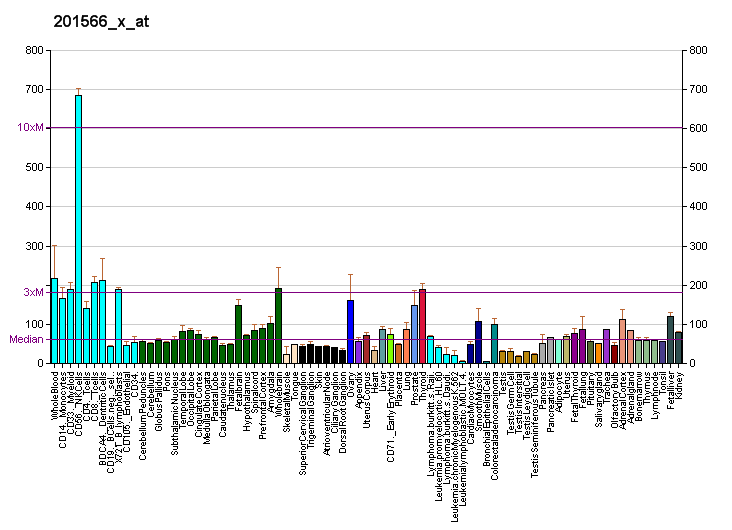

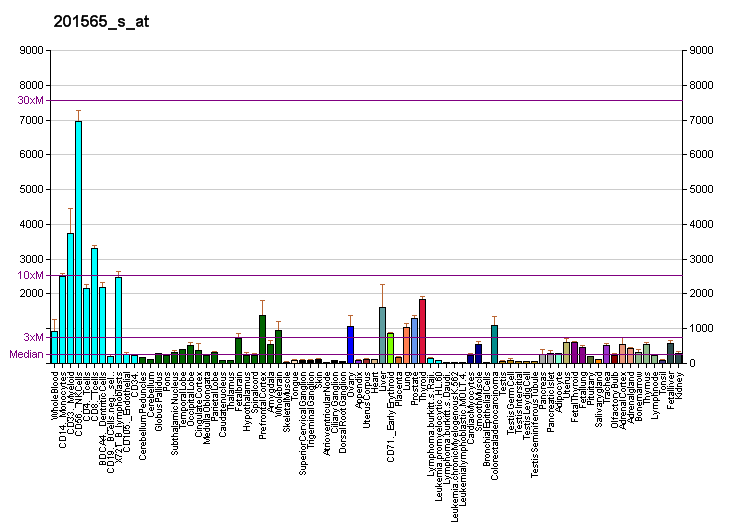
RNA expression pattern
Bgee	Human / Mouse (ortholog); Top expressed in: popliteal artery; tibial arteries; saphenous vein; pericardium; right lobe of liver; granulocyte; trachea; lower lobe of lung; renal medulla; seminal vesicula / Top expressed in: vas deferens; seminal vesicula; lobe of cerebellum; migratory enteric neural crest cell; cerebellar vermis; abdominal wall; dermis; left lung lobe; hand; parotid gland; More reference expression data
BioGPS	More reference expression data
Gene ontology
Molecular function	protein dimerization activity; transmembrane transporter binding; protein binding; DNA-binding transcription factor activity, RNA polymerase II-specific; DNA-binding transcription factor activity; transcription factor binding
Cellular component	nucleus; cytosol; cytoplasm; protein-containing complex
Biological process	regulation of G1/S transition of mitotic cell cycle; rhythmic process; negative regulation of DNA-binding transcription factor activity; regulation of transcription, DNA-templated; positive regulation of transcription involved in G1/S transition of mitotic cell cycle; multicellular organism development; negative regulation of transcription, DNA-templated; transcription, DNA-templated; negative regulation of transcription by RNA polymerase II; metanephros development; natural killer cell differentiation; thigmotaxis; leukocyte differentiation; membranous septum morphogenesis; bundle of His development; development of the heart; circadian rhythm; adult locomotory behavior; entrainment of circadian clock; positive regulation of gene expression; negative regulation of gene expression; oligodendrocyte development; regulation of lipid metabolic process; olfactory bulb development; circadian regulation of gene expression; mammary gland epithelial cell proliferation; regulation of circadian rhythm; entrainment of circadian clock by photoperiod; enucleate erythrocyte differentiation; negative regulation of DNA binding; locomotor rhythm; negative regulation of B cell differentiation; positive regulation of fat cell differentiation; positive regulation of erythrocyte differentiation; positive regulation of macrophage differentiation; negative regulation of neuron differentiation; negative regulation of osteoblast differentiation; positive regulation of blood pressure; positive regulation of transcription, DNA-templated; cell development; cell maturation; Peyer's patch development; embryonic digestive tract morphogenesis; positive regulation of smooth muscle cell proliferation; neuron fate commitment; cell morphogenesis involved in neuron differentiation; positive regulation of astrocyte differentiation; negative regulation of oligodendrocyte differentiation; adipose tissue development; mammary gland alveolus development; epithelial cell differentiation involved in mammary gland alveolus development; endodermal digestive tract morphogenesis; cellular response to lithium ion; cellular senescence; negative regulation of neural precursor cell proliferation; neuron differentiation; regulation of cell cycle
Sources:Amigo / QuickGO
Orthologs
Databases	NCBI: entry; OMA: entry
Species	Human	Mouse
Entrez	3398	15902
Ensembl	ENSG00000115738	ENSMUSG00000020644
UniProt	Q02363	P41136
RefSeq (mRNA)	NM_002166	NM_010496
RefSeq (protein)	NP_002157	NP_034626
Location (UCSC)	Chr 2: 8.68 – 8.68 Mb	Chr 12: 25.14 – 25.15 Mb
PubMed search
- Wikidata
View/Edit Human	View/Edit Mouse

DNA-binding protein inhibitor ID-2 is a protein that in humans is encoded by the ID2 gene.

== Function ==
The protein encoded by this gene belongs to the inhibitor of DNA binding (ID) family, members of which are transcriptional regulators that contain a helix-loop-helix (HLH) domain but not a basic domain. Members of the ID family inhibit the functions of basic helix-loop-helix transcription factors in a dominant-negative manner by suppressing their heterodimerization partners through the HLH domains. This protein may play a role in negatively regulating cell differentiation. A pseudogene has been identified for this gene. The ID2 protein may play a role in the development and resistance to therapies of glioblastoma, the most aggressive of brain cancers.

== Interactions ==
ID2 has been shown to interact with MyoD and NEDD9.

== See also ==
- Inhibitor of DNA-binding protein
