= TFEC =

Protein-coding gene in the species Homo sapiens

Identifiers
- Aliases: TFEC, TCFEC, TFE-C, TFEC-L, TFECL, bHLHe34, hTFEC-L, transcription factor EC
- External IDs: OMIM: 604732; MGI: 1333760; GeneCards: TFEC

Gene location (Human)
Chr.	Chromosome 7 (human)
Band	7q31.2	Start	115,935,148 bp
Band	7q31.2	End	116,159,896 bp

Gene location (Mouse)
Chr.	Chromosome 6 (mouse)
Band	6|6 A2	Start	16,833,372 bp
Band	6|6 A2	End	16,898,440 bp
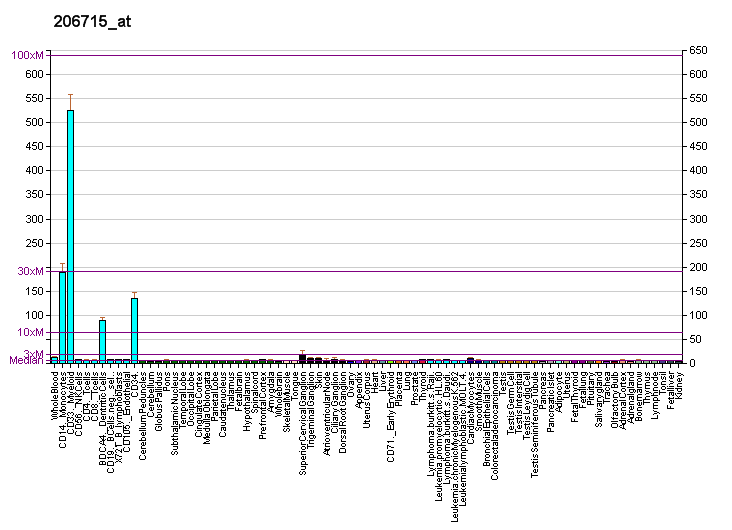
RNA expression pattern
Bgee	Human / Mouse (ortholog); Top expressed in: monocyte; testicle; granulocyte; appendix; kidney tubule; bone marrow cell; spleen; lymph node; jejunal mucosa; upper lobe of left lung / Top expressed in: epithelium of small intestine; migratory enteric neural crest cell; proximal tubule; stroma of bone marrow; right kidney; human kidney; yolk sac; morula; efferent ductule; granulocyte; More reference expression data
BioGPS	More reference expression data
Gene ontology
Molecular function	DNA-binding transcription factor activity; DNA binding; transcription coactivator activity; protein binding; protein dimerization activity; transcription corepressor activity; RNA polymerase II cis-regulatory region sequence-specific DNA binding; DNA-binding transcription activator activity, RNA polymerase II-specific; DNA-binding transcription factor activity, RNA polymerase II-specific
Cellular component	nucleus; nucleoplasm
Biological process	cellular response to heat; regulation of transcription, DNA-templated; transcription, DNA-templated; negative regulation of nucleic acid-templated transcription; transcription by RNA polymerase II; positive regulation of transcription by RNA polymerase II
Sources:Amigo / QuickGO
Orthologs
Databases	NCBI: entry; OMA: entry
Species	Human	Mouse
Entrez	22797	21426
Ensembl	ENSG00000105967	ENSMUSG00000029553
UniProt	O14948	Q9WTW4
RefSeq (mRNA)	NM_001018058; NM_001244583; NM_012252	NM_031198
RefSeq (protein)	NP_001018068; NP_001231512; NP_036384	NP_112475
Location (UCSC)	Chr 7: 115.94 – 116.16 Mb	Chr 6: 16.83 – 16.9 Mb
PubMed search
- Wikidata
View/Edit Human	View/Edit Mouse

Transcription factor EC is a protein that in humans is encoded by the TFEC gene.
