= Transcription factor 15 =

Protein-coding gene in the species Homo sapiens

TCF15

Identifiers
- Aliases: TCF15, EC2, PARAXIS, bHLHa40, transcription factor 15 (basic helix-loop-helix), transcription factor 15
- External IDs: OMIM: 601010; MGI: 104664; GeneCards: TCF15

Gene location (Human)
Chr.	Chromosome 20 (human)
Band	20p13	Start	604,257 bp
Band	20p13	End	610,309 bp

Gene location (Mouse)
Chr.	Chromosome 2 (mouse)
Band	2 G3|2 74.83 cM	Start	151,985,481 bp
Band	2 G3|2 74.83 cM	End	151,991,017 bp
RNA expression pattern
Bgee	Human / Mouse (ortholog); Top expressed in: right ventricle; apex of heart; vena cava; glutes; Skeletal muscle tissue of biceps brachii; dorsal motor nucleus of vagus nerve; Skeletal muscle tissue of rectus abdominis; body of tongue; left ventricle; gonad / Top expressed in: somite; digastric muscle; sclerotome; sternocleidomastoid muscle; masseter muscle; tibialis anterior muscle; intercostal muscle; interventricular septum; myocardium of ventricle; triceps brachii muscle; More reference expression data
BioGPS	n/a
Gene ontology
Molecular function	DNA binding; protein dimerization activity; DNA-binding transcription factor activity; RNA polymerase II cis-regulatory region sequence-specific DNA binding; DNA-binding transcription activator activity, RNA polymerase II-specific; DNA-binding transcription factor activity, RNA polymerase II-specific
Cellular component	nucleus; RNA polymerase II transcription regulator complex
Biological process	somitogenesis; respiratory system process; regulation of transcription, DNA-templated; muscle organ morphogenesis; eating behavior; neuromuscular process controlling posture; regulation of transcription by RNA polymerase II; skeletal system morphogenesis; muscle organ development; ear development; transcription, DNA-templated; multicellular organism development; establishment of epithelial cell apical/basal polarity; regulation of extracellular matrix organization; post-anal tail morphogenesis; regulation of gene expression; mesoderm development; anterior/posterior pattern specification; skin development; paraxial mesoderm development; mesenchymal to epithelial transition; transcription by RNA polymerase II; positive regulation of transcription by RNA polymerase II
Sources:Amigo / QuickGO
Orthologs
Databases	NCBI: entry; OMA: entry
Species	Human	Mouse
Entrez	6939	21407
Ensembl	ENSG00000125878	ENSMUSG00000068079
UniProt	Q12870	Q60756
RefSeq (mRNA)	NM_004609	NM_009328
RefSeq (protein)	NP_004600	NP_033354
Location (UCSC)	Chr 20: 0.6 – 0.61 Mb	Chr 2: 151.99 – 151.99 Mb
PubMed search
- Wikidata
View/Edit Human	View/Edit Mouse

Transcription factor 15 (TCF-15) also known as Paraxis, is a protein that in humans is encoded by the TCF15 gene.

== Function ==
Transcription factor 15 is found in the nucleus and is involved in the early transcriptional regulation of patterning of the mesoderm, and has a key role in somitogenesis. The encoded basic helix-loop-helix protein requires dimerization with another basic helix-loop-helix protein for efficient DNA binding. [provided by RefSeq, Jul 2008].
