= HES3 =

Protein-coding gene in humans

Identifiers
- Aliases: HES3, bHLHb43, hes family bHLH transcription factor 3
- External IDs: OMIM: 609971; MGI: 104877; GeneCards: HES3

Gene location (Human)
Chr.	Chromosome 1 (human)
Band	1p36.31	Start	6,244,179 bp
Band	1p36.31	End	6,245,578 bp

Gene location (Mouse)
Chr.	Chromosome 4 (mouse)
Band	4 E2|4 83.01 cM	Start	152,370,429 bp
Band	4 E2|4 83.01 cM	End	152,376,119 bp
RNA expression pattern
Bgee	Human / Mouse (ortholog); Top expressed in: olfactory zone of nasal mucosa / Top expressed in: urethra; male urethra; female urethra; cerebellar cortex; embryo; hair; tail of embryo; Purkinje cell; adrenal medulla; pars intermedia; More reference expression data
BioGPS	n/a
Gene ontology
Molecular function	DNA binding; transcription factor binding; protein dimerization activity; RNA polymerase II cis-regulatory region sequence-specific DNA binding; DNA-binding transcription repressor activity, RNA polymerase II-specific; DNA-binding transcription factor activity, RNA polymerase II-specific; RNA polymerase II transcription regulatory region sequence-specific DNA binding; transcription corepressor activity; sequence-specific DNA binding; sequence-specific double-stranded DNA binding
Cellular component	nucleus
Biological process	hindbrain morphogenesis; trochlear nerve development; midbrain-hindbrain boundary morphogenesis; negative regulation of transcription, DNA-templated; in utero embryonic development; negative regulation of transcription by RNA polymerase II; regulation of transcription, DNA-templated; regulation of timing of neuron differentiation; regulation of neurogenesis; oculomotor nerve development; transcription, DNA-templated; midbrain development; positive regulation of transcription by RNA polymerase II; neural tube development; somitogenesis; Notch signaling pathway; cell differentiation; anterior/posterior pattern specification
Sources:Amigo / QuickGO
Orthologs
Databases	NCBI: entry; OMA: entry
Species	Human	Mouse
Entrez	390992	15207
Ensembl	ENSG00000173673	ENSMUSG00000028946
UniProt	Q5TGS1	Q61657
RefSeq (mRNA)	NM_001024598	NM_008237
RefSeq (protein)	NP_001019769	NP_032263; NP_001390720; NP_001390721; NP_001390722; NP_001390723
Location (UCSC)	Chr 1: 6.24 – 6.25 Mb	Chr 4: 152.37 – 152.38 Mb
PubMed search
- Wikidata
View/Edit Human	View/Edit Mouse

Hes family bHLH transcription factor 3 is a protein that in humans is encoded by the HES3 gene.
