= ID1 =

Protein-coding gene in the species Homo sapiens

Identifiers
- Aliases: ID1, ID, bHLHb24, inhibitor of DNA binding 1, HLH protein
- External IDs: OMIM: 600349; MGI: 96396; GeneCards: ID1

Gene location (Human)
Chr.	Chromosome 20 (human)
Band	20q11.21	Start	31,605,283 bp
Band	20q11.21	End	31,606,515 bp

Gene location (Mouse)
Chr.	Chromosome 2 (mouse)
Band	2 H1|2 75.41 cM	Start	152,578,171 bp
Band	2 H1|2 75.41 cM	End	152,579,330 bp
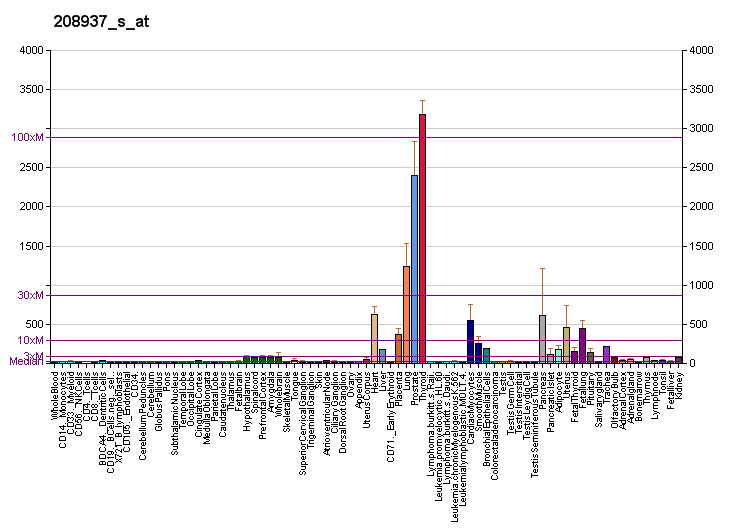
RNA expression pattern
Bgee	Human / Mouse (ortholog); Top expressed in: seminal vesicula; right lung; right lobe of thyroid gland; olfactory zone of nasal mucosa; left lobe of thyroid gland; left uterine tube; tail of epididymis; mucosa of transverse colon; gastric mucosa; apex of heart / Top expressed in: mucous cell of stomach; epithelium of stomach; optic nerve; maxillary prominence; choroid plexus of fourth ventricle; hand; molar; mandibular prominence; pyloric antrum; right lung; More reference expression data
BioGPS	More reference expression data
Gene ontology
Molecular function	protein homodimerization activity; protein dimerization activity; DNA-binding transcription factor activity; protein self-association; protein C-terminus binding; protein binding; DNA-binding transcription factor activity, RNA polymerase II-specific; transcription factor binding; protein N-terminus binding; proteasome binding
Cellular component	cytoplasm; centrosome; Golgi apparatus; nucleoplasm; nucleus
Biological process	cell-abiotic substrate adhesion; cellular response to transforming growth factor beta stimulus; cellular response to nerve growth factor stimulus; cellular response to peptide; regulation of transcription, DNA-templated; regulation of MAPK cascade; blood vessel morphogenesis; lung morphogenesis; response to organic cyclic compound; blood vessel endothelial cell migration; positive regulation of epithelial cell proliferation; rhythmic process; cellular response to dopamine; response to antibiotic; negative regulation of DNA binding; endothelial cell morphogenesis; collagen metabolic process; negative regulation of apoptotic process; negative regulation of endothelial cell differentiation; negative regulation of transcription by RNA polymerase II; regulation of angiogenesis; negative regulation of protein binding; BMP signaling pathway; negative regulation of DNA-binding transcription factor activity; transcription, DNA-templated; negative regulation of osteoblast differentiation; negative regulation of gene expression; cellular response to epidermal growth factor stimulus; multicellular organism development; development of the heart; brain development; positive regulation of gene expression; regulation of vasculature development; negative regulation of RNA polymerase II regulatory region sequence-specific DNA binding; negative regulation of dendrite morphogenesis; circadian rhythm; protein destabilization; angiogenesis; neuron differentiation; negative regulation of protein homodimerization activity; positive regulation of actin filament bundle assembly; negative regulation of transcription by transcription factor localization; lung vasculature development; negative regulation of transcription, DNA-templated; transforming growth factor beta receptor signaling pathway; negative regulation of neuron differentiation; regulation of cell cycle; negative regulation of cold-induced thermogenesis
Sources:Amigo / QuickGO
Orthologs
Databases	NCBI: entry; OMA: entry
Species	Human	Mouse
Entrez	3397	15901
Ensembl	ENSG00000125968	ENSMUSG00000042745
UniProt	P41134	P20067; Q6GTZ3
RefSeq (mRNA)	NM_181353; NM_002165	NM_010495; NM_001355113; NM_001369018
RefSeq (protein)	NP_002156; NP_851998	NP_034625; NP_001342042; NP_001355947
Location (UCSC)	Chr 20: 31.61 – 31.61 Mb	Chr 2: 152.58 – 152.58 Mb
PubMed search
- Wikidata
View/Edit Human	View/Edit Mouse

DNA-binding protein inhibitor ID-1 is a protein that in humans is encoded by the ID1 gene.

== Function ==
The protein encoded by this gene is a helix-loop-helix (HLH) protein that can form heterodimers with members of the basic HLH family of transcription factors. The encoded protein has no DNA binding activity and therefore can inhibit the DNA binding and transcriptional activation ability of basic HLH proteins with which it interacts. This protein may play a role in cell growth, senescence, and differentiation. Two transcript variants encoding different isoforms have been found for this gene.

== Interactions ==
ID1 has been shown to interact weakly with MyoD but very tightly with ubiquitously expressed E proteins. E proteins heterodimerize with tissue restricted bHLH proteins such as Myod, NeuroD, etc. to form active transcription complexes so by sequestering E proteins, Id proteins can inhibit tissue restricted gene expression in multiple cell lineages using the same biochemical mechanism. Other interacting partners include CASK.

== Clinical significance ==
ID1 can be used to mark endothelial progenitor cells which are critical to tumor growth and angiogenesis. Targeting ID1 results in decreased tumor growth. ID1 has been shown to be targeted by cannabidiol in certain gliomas and breast cancers.

== See also ==
- Inhibitor of DNA-binding protein
