= MESP1 =

Protein-coding gene in the species Homo sapiens

Identifiers
- Aliases: MESP1, bHLHc5, mesoderm posterior bHLH transcription factor 1
- External IDs: OMIM: 608689; MGI: 107785; GeneCards: MESP1

Gene location (Human)
Chr.	Chromosome 15 (human)
Band	15q26.1	Start	89,749,875 bp
Band	15q26.1	End	89,751,249 bp

Gene location (Mouse)
Chr.	Chromosome 7 (mouse)
Band	7 D2|7 45.16 cM	Start	79,441,989 bp
Band	7 D2|7 45.16 cM	End	79,443,536 bp
RNA expression pattern
Bgee	Human / Mouse (ortholog); Top expressed in: mucosa of transverse colon; oocyte; testicle; nasal epithelium; secondary oocyte; prefrontal cortex; amygdala; cingulate gyrus; anterior cingulate cortex; muscle of thigh / Top expressed in: seminiferous tubule; spermatocyte; spermatid; embryo; morula; epiblast; primitive streak; right ventricle; embryo; submandibular gland; More reference expression data
BioGPS	n/a
Gene ontology
Molecular function	DNA binding; protein dimerization activity; DNA-binding transcription factor activity; RNA polymerase II cis-regulatory region sequence-specific DNA binding; DNA-binding transcription activator activity, RNA polymerase II-specific; DNA-binding transcription factor activity, RNA polymerase II-specific
Cellular component	nucleus
Biological process	Notch signaling pathway; neurogenesis; cardiac ventricle formation; regulation of transcription, DNA-templated; lateral mesoderm development; positive regulation of hepatocyte differentiation; positive regulation of heart induction by negative regulation of canonical Wnt signaling pathway; negative regulation of mesodermal cell fate specification; cardiac muscle cell differentiation; positive regulation of Notch signaling pathway involved in heart induction; cardiac vascular smooth muscle cell differentiation; signal transduction involved in regulation of gene expression; heart morphogenesis; transcription by RNA polymerase II; transcription, DNA-templated; sinus venosus morphogenesis; heart looping; positive regulation of transcription, DNA-templated; cardioblast migration; cardiac cell fate determination; multicellular organism development; gastrulation; embryonic heart tube morphogenesis; growth involved in heart morphogenesis; positive regulation of striated muscle cell differentiation; cardioblast migration to the midline involved in heart field formation; endothelial cell differentiation; sinoatrial node cell differentiation; negative regulation of endodermal cell fate specification; secondary heart field specification; cardiac atrium formation; negative regulation of transcription, DNA-templated; cardioblast anterior-lateral migration; mesodermal cell migration; positive regulation of Notch signaling pathway; positive regulation of transcription by RNA polymerase II; mesoderm formation; somitogenesis; embryonic pattern specification
Sources:Amigo / QuickGO
Orthologs
Databases	NCBI: entry; OMA: entry
Species	Human	Mouse
Entrez	55897	17292
Ensembl	ENSG00000166823	ENSMUSG00000030544
UniProt	Q9BRJ9	P97309
RefSeq (mRNA)	NM_018670	NM_008588
RefSeq (protein)	NP_061140	NP_032614
Location (UCSC)	Chr 15: 89.75 – 89.75 Mb	Chr 7: 79.44 – 79.44 Mb
PubMed search
- Wikidata
View/Edit Human	View/Edit Mouse

Mesoderm posterior 1 homolog (mouse) is a protein that in humans is encoded by the MESP1 gene. MESP1 is a transcription factor that regulates cardiovascular progenitor specification.
