= Epigenetic regulation of neurogenesis =

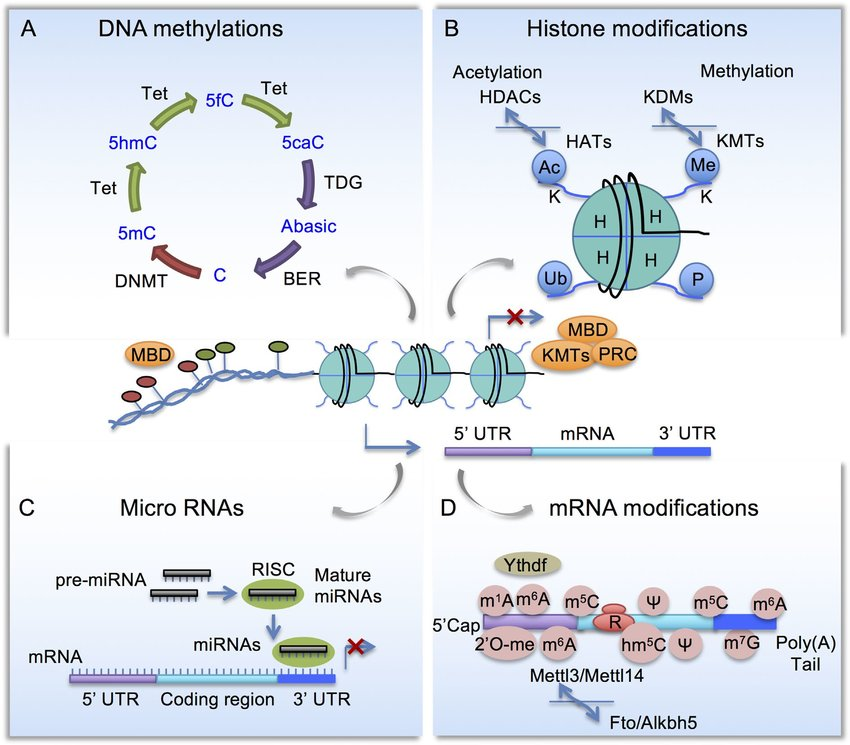

In neuroscience, epigenetic regulation of neurogenesis refers to the role of epigenetic mechanisms in controlling the production of neurons from neural stem cells during brain development and adulthood. Processes such as DNA methylation, histone modification, and microRNA expression regulate neural stem-cell proliferation, differentiation, maturation, and integration into neural circuits. Dysregulation of these mechanisms has been associated with neurological and psychiatric disorders, including Alzheimer's disease, Parkinson's disease, Huntington's disease, and Bipolar disorder.

== Mechanisms ==
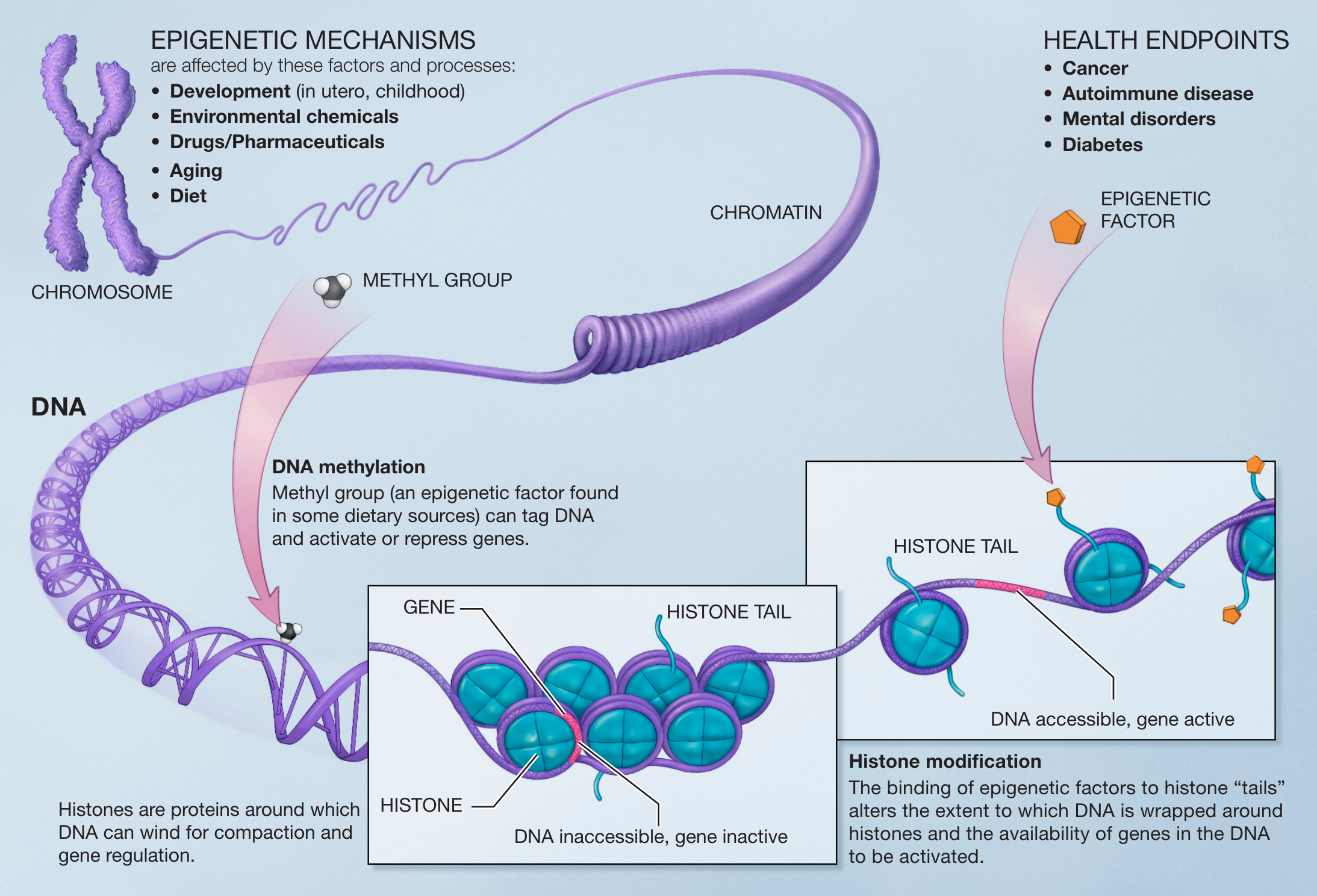
Epigenetic mechanisms in DNA

The three primary mechanisms of epigenetic regulation are histone modifications, DNA methylation, and microRNA (miRNA) expression.

=== Histones ===
Histones keep the DNA of the eukaryotic cell tightly packaged with charge interactions (like molecular Velcro) between the positive charge of the histone tail and the negative charge of the DNA and between the histone tails of nearby nucleosomes. Although there are many types of histone modification, in neural epigenetics there are two primary mechanisms: histone methylation and histone acetylation.

=== Histone methylation ===
Histone methylation occurs when methyl groups are added or removed from the histone, altering its structure to expose chromatin and leading to gene activation (or deactivation). Trimethylation of histone H3 at lysine 4 (H3K4me3) is associated with gene promoters in neurons, and trimethylation at lysine 27 (H3K27me3) represses genes that maintain stem-cell identity. A 2020 study indicated that polycomb repressive complex 2 (PRC2), which deposits H3K27me3, silences genes involved in differentiation such as Neurog2 to preserve neural stem-cell pools in the developing brain.

=== Histone acetylation ===
Histone acetylation is the addition of acetyl groups to histones by histone acetyltransferases (HATs). Acetylation neutralizes the positive charge of histones, loosening their grip on DNA and allowing transcription factors to access genes. This process is regulated by histone deacetylases (HDACs). HDACs remove acetyl groups from histones, condensing chromatin to silence genes. A 2020 study indicated that HDAC3 maintains adult hippocampal neural stem cells by balancing quiescence and activation; by deleting HDAC3, neurogenesis is disrupted and memory formation is impaired.

=== DNA methylation/demethylation ===
DNA methylation is the addition of methyl groups to cytosine or adenosine residues on DNA, forming 5-methylcytosine (typically at CpG sites); demethylation is the removal of these methyl groups. Both are crucial epigenetic processes that influence gene expression. DNA methylation, a more lasting method of gene inactivation than histone modification, is sometimes reversible. Active demethylation is mediated by Ten-Eleven Translocation (TET) enzymes, which oxidize 5-Methylcytosine to promote DNA repair. A 2024 study indicated that TET3 oxidizes methylated DNA in adult neural stem cells, activating Prox1 to drive hippocampal neurogenesis. DNA methylation by DNMT3A in adult neurons is critical for their survival and integration into memory circuits, as shown in a 2020 Nature Neuroscience study.

=== MicroRNAs (miRNAs) ===
MicroRNAs are small forms of non-coding RNA (ncRNA) that often act as "fine-tuning" mechanisms for gene expression by repressing or degrading messenger RNA (mRNA) in neural cells. A 2019 study indicated that miR-9 coordinates the switch from neural progenitor proliferation to differentiation by repressing stem-cell genes like Hes1 and Tlx. MiRNAs can also act with transcription factors to guide neurogenesis. A paper from 2020 revealed that miR-124, the most abundant brain miRNA, promotes adult neurogenesis by targeting mRNAs like PTBP1 and SCP1 to enhance neuronal maturation and synaptic integration.

== Embryonic neurogenesis ==
=== Histone modifications ===
Embryonic neurogenesis is the process in which neurons are generated during the development of an embryo. In cortical development, neural stem cells follow a precise "inside-out" sequence. Early in development, these stem cells generate the first neurons that settle in the deeper cortical layers. As development progresses, later neurons migrate past the earlier ones to form the upper layers of the cortex. This mechanism, observable in vitro and in vivo, ensures that the cortex is organized; older neurons establish foundational deep layers, and newer neurons refine the upper layers.

==== Histone methylation directs cortical layering ====
Mutant analysis indicated that disruption of the PRC2 complex, which includes the histone methyltransferase Ezh2, reduces the number of upper-layer neurons (those expressing markers such as POU3F2/BRN2 and SATB2) by half, leaving deeper layers unaffected. One study demonstrated that PRC2-mediated H3K27me3 silences stem-cell genes such as Sox11, enabling progenitors to transition to upper-layer neurons.

Experiments using mouse embryonic stem cell-derived neural progenitors showed that increased histone deacetylase, induced by the HDAC inhibitor valproic acid, promoted neuronal differentiation and selectively enriched upper-layer neurons. It is hypothesized that HDAC inhibition may drive a switch from progenitors which produce deep-layer neurons to those that generate upper-layer neurons. The mechanisms behind this selective differentiation and the timing control associated with HDAC inhibition are not fully understood.

=== DNA methylation ===
DNA methylation plays a crucial role in corticogenesis, as demonstrated by experiments in mice. Ablation of DNMT3b and DNMT1 in embryos is fatal due to neural tube defects, highlighting their importance during early development. Deletion of DNMT3a does not result in embryonic death but severely impairs postnatal neurogenesis, indicating that it is not essential for embryonic survival but is vital for the proper formation of the cerebral cortex after birth.

==== Timing of DNMT activity ====
DNMT3b is expressed primarily in early neural progenitors, and its expression declines as development proceeds. DNMT3a is barely detectable until embryonic day 10 (E10), after which its levels surge around E13.5 and remain elevated in adult neurogenic regions such as the subventricular zone (SVZ) and the hippocampal dentate gyrus.

==== DNMT3a regulates neuron-glia fate switching ====
DNMT3a plays an important role in regulating neuron-glia fate switching. In postnatal neural progenitors, loss of DNMT3a leads to the downregulation of neuronal genes such as Dlx2, Neurog2 and Sp8, and upregulates genes associated with astrocytes and oligodendrocytes. A study published in 2021 confirmed that DNMT3a is essential for maintaining neuronal identity by methylating the promoters of gliogenic genes, including SOX9.

==== DNA methylation in key genes ====
DNA methylation plays a pivotal role in regulating key genes during neurogenesis. HES5 is hypermethylated at embryonic day 7.5 (E7.5), but becomes demethylated by E9.5 through the activity of TET enzymes rather than GCM1 or GCM2. A 2019 study indicated that TET2 oxidizes 5-Methylcytosine at HES5, which enables notch signaling to drive the expansion of neural stem cells. The GFAP gene is repressed during early neurogenesis due to methylation of its STAT3 binding sites. Research published in 2001 demonstrated that DNMT3a maintains GFAP methylation until E14.5, delaying the differentiation of astrocytes.

=== miRNAs ===
==== Mechanisms ====
MiRNA mechanisms

Conditional knockout of Dicer (an enzyme essential for miRNA synthesis) in the mouse neocortex reduces cortical size, increases neuronal apoptosis, and disrupts cortical layering. Neuroepithelial and progenitor cells remain unaffected until embryonic day 14 (E14), after which they undergo apoptosis. A 2013 study confirmed that this stage-specific requirement for miRNAs ensures proper cortical development, although the miRNAs involved are unclear.

==== Key miRNAs in neurogenesis ====
MiRNAs play essential roles in neurogenesis by finely tuning gene expression to control neuron differentiation and migration. MiR-124, the most abundant CNS miRNA, promotes the transition of subventricular zone progenitors into neuroblasts by suppressing SOX9. A 2009 study indicated that miR-124 silences SOX9 via a conserved binding site in its 3'UTR, enabling progression along the neuronal lineage. Another example is miR-9, which regulates neuronal differentiation and self-renewal. A 2016 study found that ectopic expression of miR-9 in the mouse cortex prematurely activates NEUROD1 (a pro-neuronal gene) and disrupts neuronal migration by targeting FOXG1.

==== Beyond fine-tuning ====
Contrary to the idea that miRNAs fine-tune gene expression, miR-9 and miR-124 can reprogram human fibroblasts into neurons without the need for transcription factors like NeuroD1. A 2018 study demonstrated that these miRNAs can remodel chromatin accessibility at key neuronal loci such as MAP2 and SYN1, enabling the conversion of fibroblasts to neurons (although this method is less efficient than approaches based on transcription factors).

These epigenetic mechanisms are not confined to embryonic development. In the adult brain, dynamic DNA methylation, histone modifications, and miRNAs continue to orchestrate neurogenesis in niches such as the hippocampal dentate gyrus and subventricular zone. DNMT3a-dependent methylation and of miR-124 activity play a crucial role in maintaining the balance between neuronal stem-cell quiescence and activation. This regulation is essential for lifelong neural plasticity and cognitive function.

== Adult neurogenesis ==
=== Adult DNA methylation ===
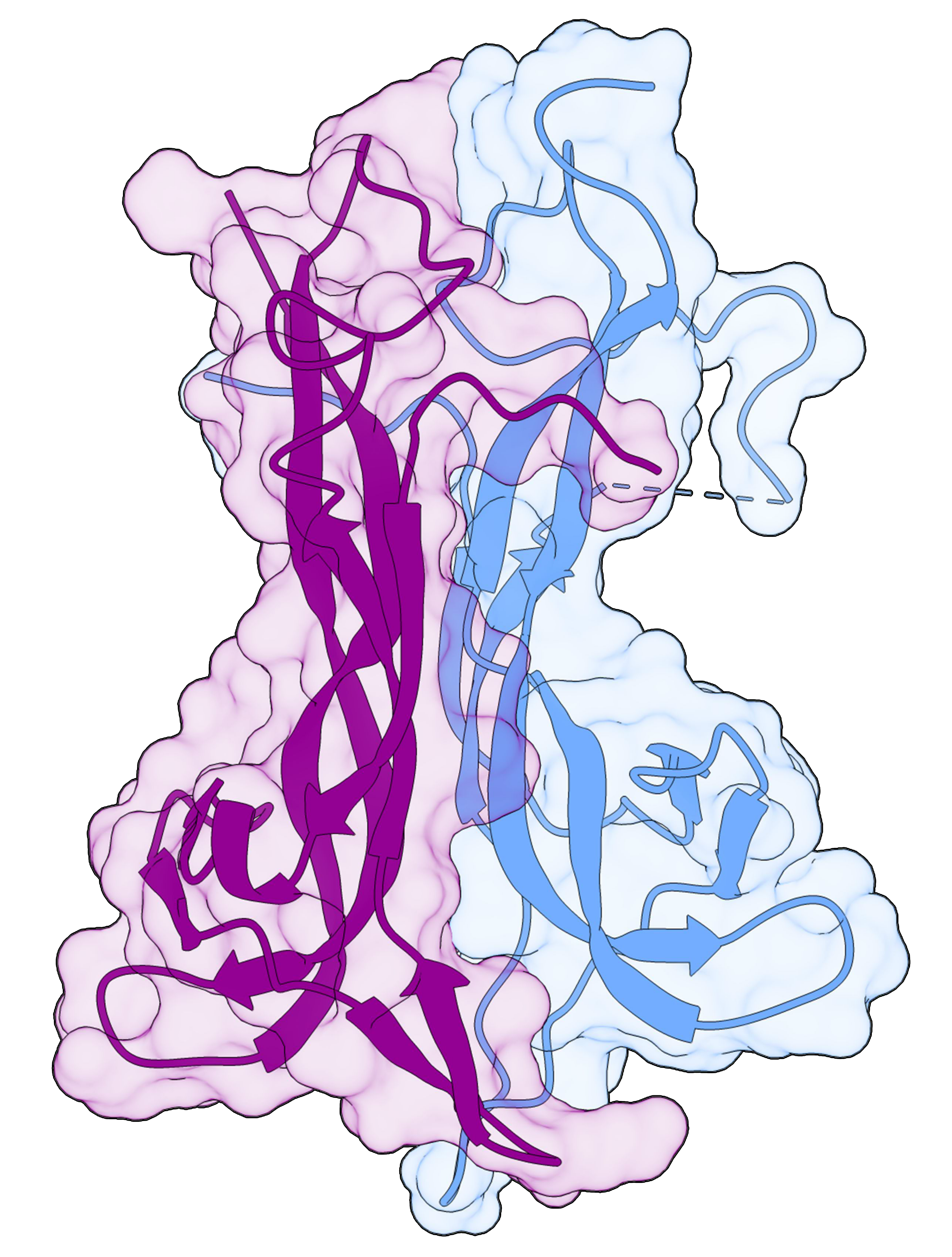
Illustration of a brain-derived neurotrophic factor protein, essential for neuronal development

Neurogenesis that persists through adulthood is known as adult neurogenesis. An important animal gene involved in the epigenetic regulation of adult neurogenesis is the growth arrest and DNA-damage-inducible, beta (GADD45B) gene, often studied in rodents. Through the demethylation of promoters, GADD45B activates genes such as brain-derived neurotrophic factor (Bdnf) and basic fibroblast growth factor (FGF-2 or bFGF); both are essential for neural progenitor-cell development. There is increased expression of Bdnf and FGF2 with upregulation of GADD45B, resulting in more neural progenitor cells in adulthood.

=== Histone acetylation in neural stem-cell regulation ===
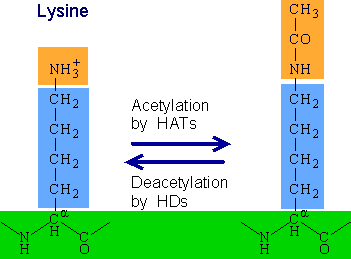
Histone acetylation and deacetylation: HATs add acetyl groups, loosening chromatin for gene activation; HDACs remove them, tightening chromatin for gene repression.

DNA is packaged into chromatin, a structure made up of nucleosome subunits consisting of four histone proteins: H2A, H2B, H3 and H4. Histone acetylation and deacetylation play a role in the proliferation and renewal of post-embryonic neural stem cells. H4 histones retain their basic charge in the absence of acetylation, allowing them to interact with the acidic pockets of H2A-H2B dimers in neighboring nucleosomes. This interaction reinforces nucleosome-nucleosome association, resulting in more tightly-packed chromatin. Acetylation neutralizes the basic charge of H4 histones, disrupting these interactions and preventing chromatin compaction. This process allows greater expression of target genes, such as brain-derived neurotrophic factor, which are involved in adult neurogenesis. Acetylation is made possible by histone acetyltransferases (HATs), which add acetyl groups to histones and promote gene expression by loosening chromatin structure. Histone deacetylases (HDACs) remove acetyl groups, leading to chromatin condensation and gene repression. Histone acetylation plays a key role in the differentiation of neural stem cells into specific cell types. A notable example is the chromatin regulator BRPF1, which is expressed in the developing central nervous system. It is crucial for the formation of brain regions such as the neocortex and dentate gyrus of the hippocampus. BRPF1 functions by activating histone acetyltransferases such as MOZ, MORF, and HBO1.

=== Role of HDAC Inhibitors in Promoting Neurogenesis ===
Valproic acid (VPA), a broad-spectrum HDAC inhibitor, promotes histone acetylation and gene expression.

Histone deacetylase inhibitors (HDACi)—such as valproic acid (VPA) and trichostatin A—can enhance adult neurogenesis by blocking HDAC activity, which promotes the differentiation of adult neural progenitor cells. In neural stem cells, HDAC1 and HDAC2 work with the transcription factor TLX to suppress genes that limit cell proliferation, including the cell cycle inhibitor P21 and the tumor suppressor Pten. This repression supports the self-renewal and proliferation of neural stem cells. However, when HDACs are inhibited—such as by VPA, an antiepileptic drug—it can shift neural stem cells toward neuronal differentiation. Similar to processes seen in embryonic neurogenesis, VPA can also suppress glial cell differentiation in adult neural stem cells. This effect is likely driven by the upregulation of neuron-specific genes, including neurogenic basic helix-loop-helix (bHLH) transcription factors like NEUROD, NEUROGENIN1, and MATH1. While HDAC inhibition can promote neurogenesis, complete loss of HDAC1 and HDAC2 in neural progenitor cells has the opposite effect, potentially preventing proper neuronal differentiation. Similarly, their loss in oligodendrocyte progenitor cells disrupts oligodendrocyte formation, highlighting that histone deacetylation plays distinct and essential roles at various stages of neural development.

=== MicroRNAs and Post-Transcriptional Regulation of Neurogenesis ===
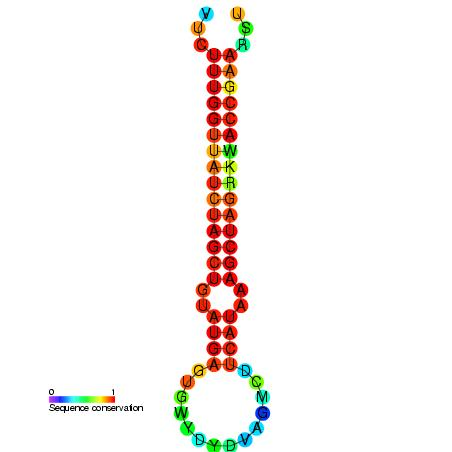
pri-mRNA secondary structure of miR-9.

MicroRNAs (miRNAs) are small noncoding RNAs that regulate gene expression at the post-transcriptional level, controlling protein production without altering the DNA sequence. One important microRNA in adult neurogenesis is miR-9, which plays a crucial role in cell differentiation. miR-9 targets the nuclear receptor TLX in adult neurogenesis to promote neural differentiation and inhibit neural stem cell proliferation. It also influences neuronal subtype specification and regulates axonal growth, branching, and targeting in the central nervous system through interactions with HES1, a neural stem cell homeostasis molecule.

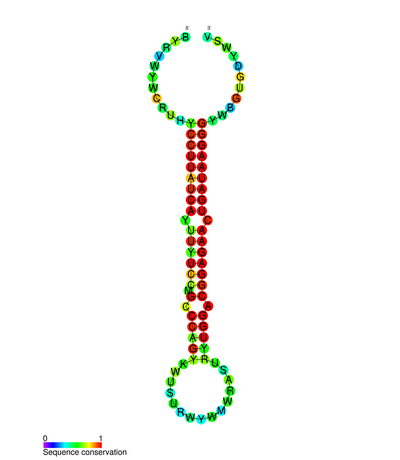
pri-mRNA secondary structure of miR-184.

Another crucial miRNA in adult neurogenesis is miR-124, which promotes cell cycle exit and neuronal differentiation. Several mouse studies have shown that ectopic expression of miR-124 leads to premature differentiation and depletion of neural progenitor cells in the subventricular zone (SVZ), a major adult neurogenic region lining the lateral ventricles. The SVZ continuously generates neuroblasts that migrate to the olfactory bulb, and miR-124 overexpression disrupts this process by forcing early cell cycle exit, ultimately reducing long-term neurogenesis. In addition to miR-9 and miR-124, other miRNAs play essential roles in regulation of adult neurogenesis. miR-137, miR-184 and miR-195 regulate adult neural stem cell proliferation, with their over-expression leading to up-regulated proliferation while their down-regulation leads to a decrease in neuronal proliferation. Methyl-CpG binding protein 1 (MBD1) represses miR-184, a microRNA that promotes the proliferation of adult neural stem/progenitor cells (aNSCs) while inhibiting their differentiation by targeting and downregulating Numblike (Numbl), a protein involved in promoting neuronal differentiation. In adult neurogenesis, MBD1, miR-184, and Numbl function together to balance stem cell maintenance and neuronal output. Similarly, miR-195 forms a negative regulatory loop with MBD1; its inhibition promotes aNSC differentiation, and its levels naturally decrease as differentiation proceeds. Disruptions in MBD1 or miRNA signaling have been linked to neurodevelopmental disorders, mood disorders, and impaired cognitive function, all of which underscore the importance of finely tuned adult neurogenesis.

== Astrocyte reprogramming ==
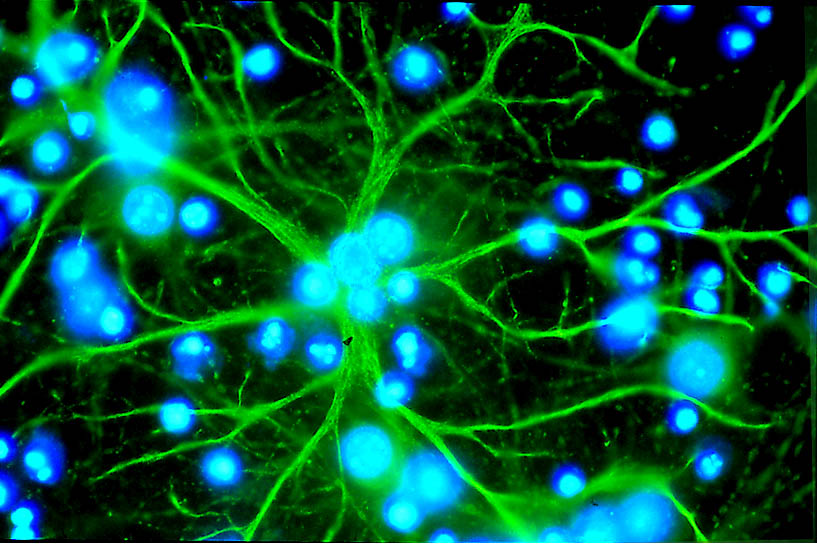
Fluorescent microscopy image astrocytes in the human brain.

Astrocytes are glial cells that form the blood-brain barrier and support the synapse. Unlike neurons, glial cells can alter their cell fate prior to reaching full maturation, and "dedifferentiate" due to epigenetic factors. While dedifferentiation is still possible, the expression of genes Mash1, NeuroG1 and NeuroG2 can reprogram astrocytes into neurons. This is made possible by the increased acetylation at the H3K9 and H3K14 residues near the NeuroG1 and NeuroG2 genes, trigger neuron differentiation.

Additionally, silencing DNA methylation mechanisms—particularly various DNA methyltransferases—prevents astrocyte progenitor cells from redifferentiating into their original glial cell fate. Repression of DNA methylation is essential to block genes required for astrocyte maturation, maintaining a more plastic, undifferentiated state. Overexpression of the histone methyltransferase Ezh2, which catalyzes tri-methylation at H3K27, represses genes involved in astrocyte maintenance, allowing the cell to retain a neural stem cell-like morphology. This shows that different methyltransferases can either promote or inhibit astrocyte dedifferentiation, depending on their activity. Although Ezh2 alone cannot induce dedifferentiation, it is necessary for the process, as its absence prevents astrocytes from reverting to a progenitor state. Once in this state, expression of NeuroD4 can drive neuronal differentiation, enabling neurogenesis from dedifferentiated astrocytes in the adult brain.

== In memory ==
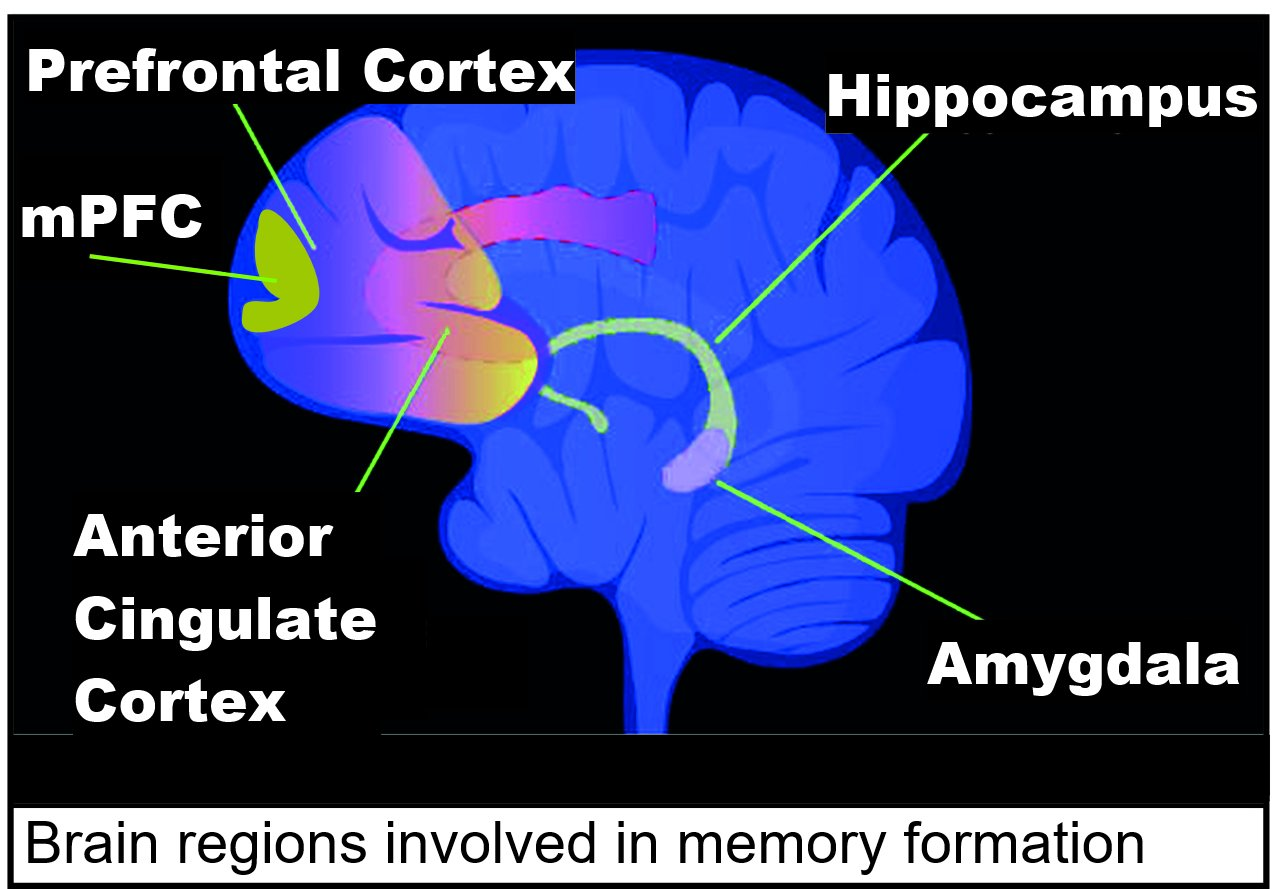
Image of the Brain to Identify the Hippocampus.

The Growth Arrest and DNA Damage inducible 45 (Gadd45) gene family plays a large role in the hippocampus. Gadd45 facilitates hippocampal long-term potentiation and enhances persisting memory for motor performance, aversive conditioning, and spatial navigation. Additionally, DNA methylation has been shown to be important for activity-dependent modulation of adult neurogenesis in the hippocampus, which is mediated by GADD45b. GADD45b seems to act as a sensor in mature neurons for environmental changes which it expresses through these methylation changes. This was determined by examining the effects of applying an electric stimulus to the hippocampal dentate gyrus (DG) in normal and GADD45b knockout mice. In normal mice application of electrical stimulation to the DG increased neurogenesis by increasing BDNF. However, in GADD45b deficient mice the electrical stimulus had less of an effect. Further analysis revealed that this effect is mediated through the activation of immediate early genes (IEGs), including c-Fos and Arc, which are crucial for synaptic plasticity.

Recent research has also linked GADD45b to cognitive flexibility, demonstrating that its deficiency impairs reversal learning in behavioral assays. This suggests that GADD45b influences both memory persistence and adaptability, making it a key target for neurocognitive interventions.

Further examination revealed that around 1.4% of CpG islands in DG neurons are actively methylated and demethylated upon electric shock. This shows that the post-mitotic methylation states of neurons are not static and given that electric shock equipment such as that used in the study has been shown to have therapeutic effects to human patients with depression and other psychiatric disorders, the possibility remains that epigenetic mechanisms may play an important role in the pathophysiology of neuropsychiatric disorders.

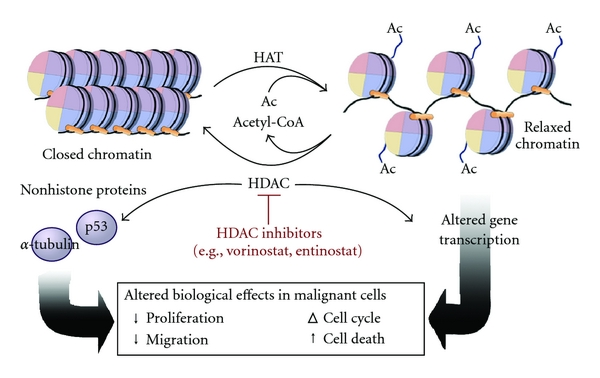
Diagram Illustrating Histone Acetylation and Deacetylation.

Histone modifications have also been linked to learning and memory. Histone acetylation, particularly at H3 and H4, has been associated with increased synaptic plasticity and memory formation. Studies indicate that histone deacetylase (HDAC) inhibitors, such as Trichostatin A (TSA) and sodium butyrate, enhance long-term potentiation and memory consolidation by promoting chromatin relaxation and increasing gene accessibility. Additionally, histone methylation plays a role in regulating neuronal plasticity. Specifically, H3K4 methylation has been shown to activate memory-related genes, whereas H3K9 and H3K27 methylation are associated with gene repression. The balance of these modifications influences cognitive function and memory retention. These modifications interact dynamically, with H3K4me3 enrichment linked to active transcription and memory consolidation, while H3K27me3-mediated repression prevents aberrant gene activation.

MicroRNAs also contribute to the epigenetic regulation of memory. miR-132, in particular, has been found to promote dendritic growth and synaptic plasticity, which are essential for learning processes. Dysregulation of miR-132 has been implicated in cognitive impairments, suggesting its role in memory-related disorders. Additionally, miR-124, a key regulator of neuronal differentiation, has been shown to influence synaptic function and plasticity by modulating chromatin structure and transcription factor expression. Emerging evidence suggests that miR-124 also regulates neuronal excitability by targeting ion channel transcripts, further influencing learning and memory pathways.

DNMT1 and DNMT3a are both required in conjunction for learning, memory, and synaptic plasticity. These enzymes contribute to the maintenance of methylation homeostasis, with DNMT3a facilitating de novo methylation of plasticity-related genes while DNMT1 ensures the stability of established epigenetic marks.

== Epigenetic dysregulation and neurological disorders ==
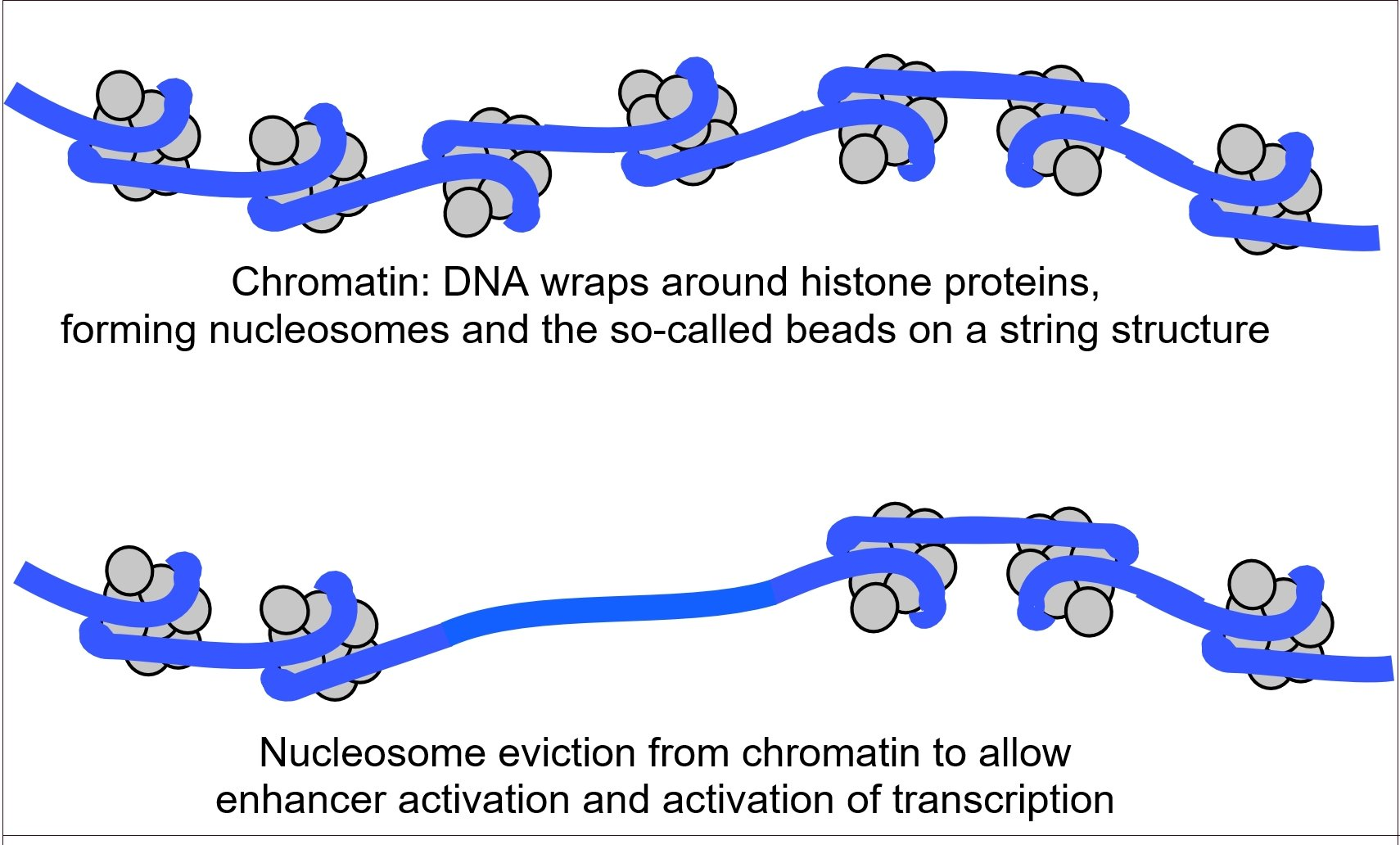
Visual Depiction of Chromatin as Euchromatin and Heterochromatin.

Epigenetic dysregulation, or alterations in epigenomic machinery, can dysregulate DNA methylation and histone acetylation processes. The epigenetic machinery influences neural differentiation regulation (i.e. neurogenesis) and are also involved in processes related to memory consolidation and learning in healthy individuals. DNA methylation and histone modifications play a critical role in modulating gene expression related to synaptic plasticity, which is essential for learning and memory formation. Increasing age can produce various epigenetic changes such as reduced global heterochromatin, nucleosome remodeling, altered histone marks, and changes in DNA methylation. For instance, nucleosome loss occurs due to aging because core histone proteins are lost and less protein synthesis occurs. Epigenetic control of enhancer regions in neurons has been linked to neurodegenerative diseases, particularly Alzheimer's disease, where dysregulated chromatin accessibility contributes to neuronal dysfunction. Notably, chromatin loops that regulate enhancer-promoter interactions appear to be disrupted in neurodegenerative conditions, leading to widespread transcriptional alterations. As aging is the main risk for many neurological disorders, epigenetic dysregulation can in turn lead to alterations on the transcriptional level of genes involved in the pathogenesis of neural degenerative diseases such as Parkinson's disease, Alzheimer's disease, Huntington's disease, schizophrenia, and bipolar disease.

DNA hydroxymethylation, a modification mediated by TET enzymes, has recently been implicated in the aging brain. Studies show that global 5-hydroxymethylcytosine (5hmC) levels decline with age, potentially contributing to neurodegeneration through loss of gene activation at critical neuronal loci.

Recent studies highlight that epigenetic mutations affecting chromatin regulators can result in widespread transcriptional disruptions, contributing not only to common neurodegenerative diseases but also to rare neurological conditions. For example, mutations in MECP2, a key epigenetic regulator, lead to Rett syndrome, a severe neurodevelopmental disorder characterized by intellectual disability and motor impairments.

=== Alzheimer's disease ===
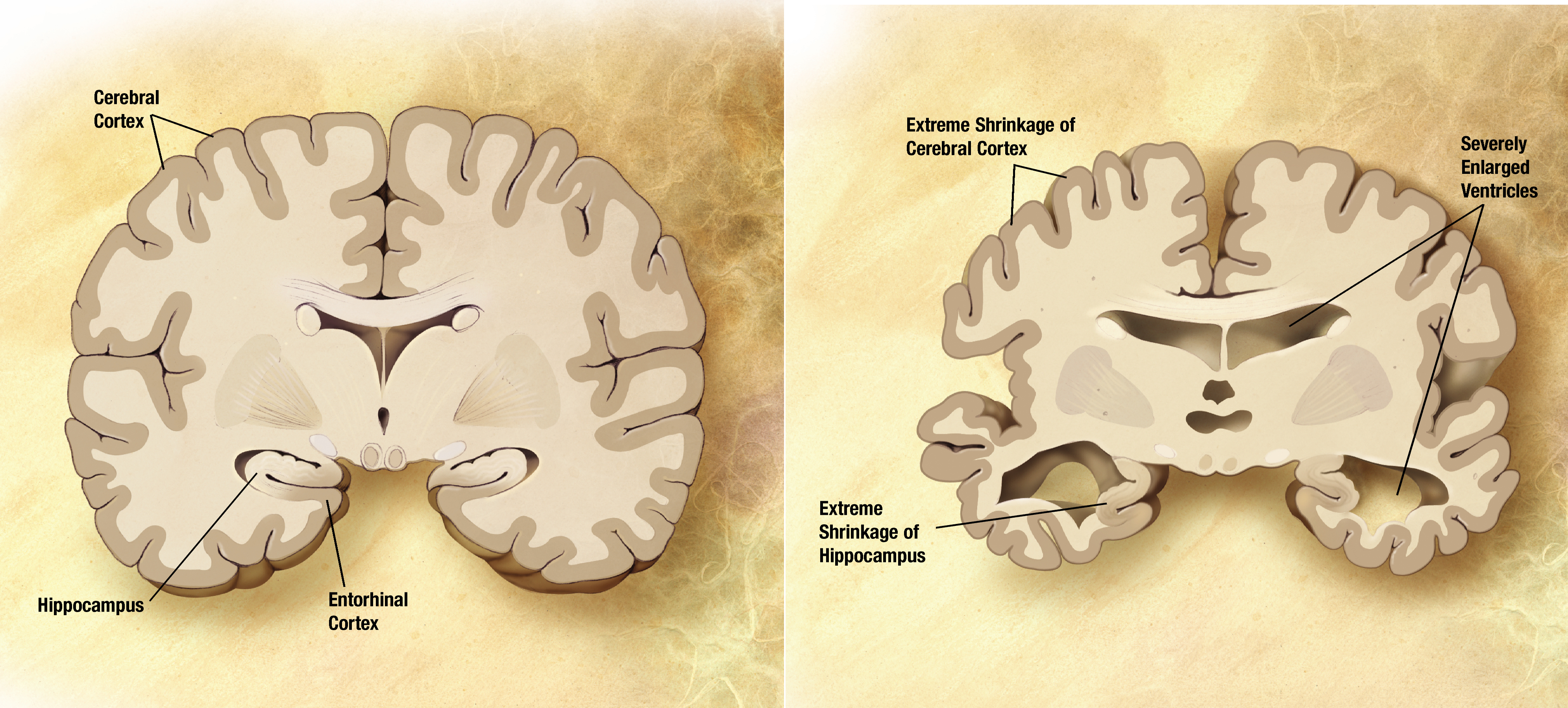
Brain Comparison of Alzheimer's vs. Non-Alzheimer's.

MicroRNA expression is critical for neurogenesis. In patients with Alzheimer's disease miR-9 and miR-128 are upregulated, while miR-15a is downregulated. These microRNAs have been shown to regulate key neuronal genes involved in synaptic plasticity and neuroinflammation, further linking their dysregulation to cognitive decline in Alzheimer's patients. Alzheimer's patients also show decreases in brain-derived neurotrophic factor, which has been shown to be repressed through DNA methylation. BDNF reduction impairs neuronal survival and synaptic function, exacerbating memory deficits associated with the disease. Loss of BDNF signaling is associated with synaptic atrophy, contributing to the hallmark cognitive deficits of Alzheimer's disease. Although one of the strongest pieces of evidence for epigenetic influence in Alzheimer's is the gene that controls the protein responsible for amyloid plaque formation, APP. This gene has very high GC content in its promoter region, meaning that it is highly susceptible to DNA methylation. This promoter site has been shown to naturally reduce methylation with aging, exemplifying the parallels between aging and Alzheimer's already well known. Epigenetic regulation of enhancer regions in neurons has also been implicated in Alzheimer's disease, with studies showing that chromatin accessibility changes contribute to disease progression by altering transcriptional programs essential for neuronal function. Additionally, recent findings suggest that differential DNA methylation of tau-related genes contributes to tau pathology, another defining feature of Alzheimer's disease.

Heavy metals also seem to interfere with epigenetic mechanisms. Specifically in the case of APP, lead exposure earlier in life has been shown to cause a marked over-expression of the APP protein, leading to more amyloid plaque later in life in the aging brain. Other environmental toxins, such as air pollutants and pesticides, have also been suggested to induce epigenetic modifications that contribute to Alzheimer's pathology.

DNA methylation's age relation has been further investigated in the promoter regions of several Alzheimer's related genes in the brains of postmortem late-onset Alzheimer's disease patients. The older patients seem to have more abnormal epigenetic machinery than the younger patients, despite the fact that both had died from Alzheimer's. Though this in of itself is not conclusive evidence of anything, it has led to an age-related epigenetic drift theory where abnormalities in epigenetic machinery and exposure to certain environmental factors which occur earlier in life lead to aberrant DNA methylation patterns far later, contributing to sporadic Alzheimer's Disease predisposition. This epigenetic drift theory suggests that cumulative changes in DNA methylation, histone modifications, and chromatin remodeling over time contribute to neurodegeneration, providing a potential link between aging and late-onset Alzheimer's disease.

Illustration of Histone Modifications.

Histone modifications may also have an impact in Alzheimer's disease, but the differences between HDAC effects in rodent brains compared to human brains have researchers puzzled. As the focus for neurodegenerative diseases begins to shift towards epigenetic pharmacology, it can be expected that the interactions of histone modifications with respect to neurogenesis will become clearer. Histone deacetylase (HDAC) inhibitors have shown promise in preclinical studies, as they can restore cognitive function by enhancing synaptic plasticity and memory consolidation, though their effects in humans remain under investigation.

=== Huntington's disease ===
Histone acetylation has received increasing support over the years as a proposed mechanism through which epigenetic dysregulation leads changes in gene expression that contribute to HD. Studies that look at mice with HD versus the wild type (WT) have shown that specific gene loci (Drd2, Penk1, Actb, and Grin1) decrease in histone acetylation levels, suggesting that a mutation of the Huntington (HTT) gene and its overexpression may be the cause of this epigenetic dysregulation. Additionally, research has demonstrated that mutant HTT can interfere with histone acetyltransferase (HAT) activity, further reducing histone acetylation and leading to widespread transcriptional repression in neurons.

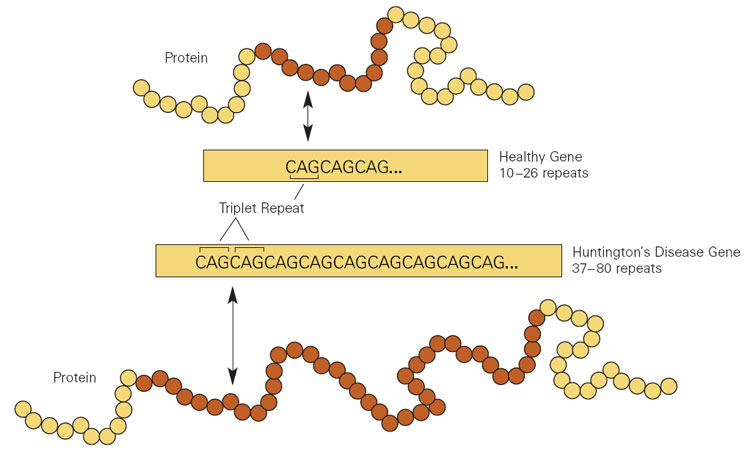
Repetitions of the cytosine-adenine-guanine (CAG) nucleotide sequence.

It has been thought that HDAC inhibitors (HDACis) could partially reverse the low acetylation levels seen in patients with HD. Preclinical studies have been performed using various HDACis [such as suberoxylanilide hydroxamic acid (SAHA), Trichostatin A (TSA), phenylbutyrate, and sodium butyrate (NaB)] that target HDACI and HDACII. Although these inhibitors improve some phenotypes of HD in mice, such as neuropathology and motor function, these beneficial effects do not lead towards a conclusion for the definitive need for increasing acetylation levels in HD patients. Recent findings suggest that HDAC inhibition may not only affect histone proteins but also modulate non-histone targets involved in neuronal survival, axonal transport, and protein aggregation.

However, inactivation of a target of SAHA, Hdac 4, alleviates neurodegenerative complications in mice with HD through a transcription-independent mechanism which acts upon mutant Htt aggregation processes-which may indicate that there is a mechanism involving non-histone proteins. The proposed mechanism through which SAHA is speculated to act is through a RANBP2-mediated proteasome degradation model, where HDAC inhibition promotes enhanced clearance of misfolded mutant HTT aggregates. In this mechanism, SAHA is shown to down-regulate Hdac 4 through an increase in sumoylation, which is then followed up with the activation of degradation through a proteasomal pathway. This mechanism reveals the connectivity between acetylation, deacetylation, and sumoylation processes.

Chemical Structure of Sodium Phenylbutyrate.

As of 2014, HDACi treatment has not been shown to restore normal expression of neuronal-identity genes. However clinical studies using HDACi are currently ongoing and the results are pending, with the Phase II studies showing promise for safe and tolerable use of several compounds such as phenylbutyrate. Newer approaches are investigating more selective HDAC inhibitors that target specific isoforms, aiming to minimize off-target effects while maximizing therapeutic benefits.

Non-histone-mediated beneficial effects of HDACi have also been documented in models of Parkinson disease, suggesting common mechanisms between several neurodegenerative diseases. This overlap highlights the potential of epigenetic-based therapies to target multiple neurodegenerative conditions by restoring transcriptional homeostasis and reducing toxic protein accumulation.

=== Parkinson's disease ===
DNA methylation analysis showed that there is significant dysregulation of methylation on CpG islands in patients with PD when compared to healthy individuals. Although this was genome-wide, this also occurred on many PD risk genes. Specifically, differential methylation patterns have been identified in genes associated with dopaminergic neuron survival, inflammation, and mitochondrial function, highlighting epigenetic regulation as a key factor in PD pathogenesis.

Mitochondrial DNA methylation of cytosine has also been shown to fluctuate over time due to age variance, as there is a growing body of literature linking mtDNA methylation to aging and oxidative stress. A study from 2015 by Hashizume et al. showed that SHMT2 mRNA levels are significantly reduced in the fibroblasts of old people when compared to younger individuals. The study also further indicated that decreased GCAT and SHMT2 levels of gene expression via shRNA and siRNA, respectively, in the fibroblasts of young patients led to a respiratory chain dysfunction typical for senile individuals-suggesting that an epigenetic mechanism may be the cause for the phenotypic change. These findings reinforce the role of mitochondrial epigenetics in cellular aging and suggest that PD-related mitochondrial dysfunction may, in part, be driven by epigenetic modifications. As mitochondria play a role in the development of the PD, further research into the area will help uncover any implications that mitochondrial DNA methylation plays in the pathogenesis of PD.

Diagram Depicting Dopaminergic Pathways in the Brain.

The use of dopaminergic neurons that have been isolated from the PD patients indicated that there were increases in acetylation (at H2A, H3 and H4) when compared to the age-control group. Histone acetylation changes have been linked to transcriptional dysregulation in PD, affecting genes responsible for neuronal survival and synaptic plasticity. Another study involving MPP+ (a compound that can cause a disease state resembling mammals and humans with PD)-treated cells and (MPP+)-treated mouse brains showed decreased HDAC levels, as well as in midbrain samples from patients with PD. This is seen potentially due to how MPP+ promotes the breakdown of HDAC1 and HDAC2 via autophagy, a bodily process of cycling out old cells to make room for newer, healthier cells. These results point toward the stress of histone modifications in regard to chromatin remodeling and its implication in the pathogenesis of PD. Further, altered histone deacetylation has been shown to affect key pathways involved in neuroinflammation and dopaminergic neuron survival, contributing to disease progression.

miRNAs are also emerging as relevant contributors to neurodegeneration in PD. In particular, the frontal cortex PD patients have shown higher levels of LRRK2 and lower levels of miR-205 when compared to healthy individuals. Connecting this to the findings of miR-205's ability to bind to the 3′ UTR of LRRK2 mRNA and suppress expression, as well as miR-205's prevention of defects after introduction to a R1441G LRRK2 mutation, these results point towards miR-205 and its regulatory role in LRRK2 expression-which in turn suggests a regulatory role in the pathogenesis of PD. This highlights the therapeutic potential of miRNA-based interventions aimed at restoring normal gene expression in PD patients.

In another study in which increasing microtubule acetylation using deacetylase inhibitors or the tubulin acetylase αTAT1 showed prevention of the association of mutant LRRK2 with microtubules, inhibition of deacetylases HDAC6 and Sirt2 through knockdown processes rescued both axonal transport and locomotor behavior. This further connects to the common mechanisms involving HDACi in various neurodegenerative diseases. Targeting HDAC6 and Sirt2 has been proposed as a potential neuroprotective strategy, as these enzymes regulate cellular stress responses and cytoskeletal stability in neurons.

=== Bipolar Disorder ===
Diagram of the Subtypes of Bipolar Disorder.

Bipolar disorders are both highly complex and heritable, which makes it interesting to examine for epigenetic modifications. DNA methylation, DNA hydroxymethylation, and histone modifications are all capable of contributing to the formation of bipolar disorder. Epigenetic mechanisms can influence key neurotransmitter systems, neuroinflammatory pathways, and circadian rhythm genes, all of which are implicated in bipolar disorder pathophysiology.

For example, studies of monozygotic twins revealed that individuals with bipolar disorder had lower methylation of the peptidylprolyl isomerase E-like (PPIEL) gene, which can be attributed to the dopamine transmission. The studies indicated that hypermethylation of SLC6A4, a serotonin transporter gene, is also involved with bipolar disorder. Altered serotonin transporter methylation has been linked to mood instability and antidepressant response in affected individuals. Greater expression of DNA methyltransferase 1 in cortical GABAergic interneurons may enable hypermethylation. Hypermethylation may prompt hydroxymethylation to occur in order to overcompensate for the repressive effects of hypermethylation.

The methylation of CpG regions are relevant to bipolar disorders. Patients with bipolar disorder showed lower methylation levels for the CpG region of the KCNQ3 gene, which is responsible for the voltage-gated K+ channel. Since voltage-gated potassium channels regulate neuronal excitability, their dysregulation could contribute to the manic and depressive episodes characteristic of bipolar disorder. Childhood maltreatment contributed to the methylation status of CpG2 III of 5-hydroxytryptamine 3A, which alters how maltreatment affects bipolar disorder. These findings suggest that early-life stressors can leave lasting epigenetic marks that modulate the risk and severity of bipolar disorder later in life.

Moreover, therapeutic interventions such as engineered transcription factors could modify chromatin structure to address the epigenetic changes found in those with bipolar disorder. DNA methyltransferase (DNMT) inhibitors and histone deacetylase (HDAC) inhibitors could possibly reverse epigenetic modifications in order to therapeutically address bipolar disorder. HDAC inhibitors have been shown to regulate gene expression patterns involved in mood stabilization, and preclinical studies suggest they may enhance the efficacy of conventional mood stabilizers such as lithium. DNMT inhibitors and HDAC often produces antidepressant-like effects. However, challenges remain in developing targeted epigenetic therapies that can selectively modify aberrant epigenetic marks without widespread off-target effects.

== Epigenetic therapies for neurodegenerative and psychiatric disorders ==
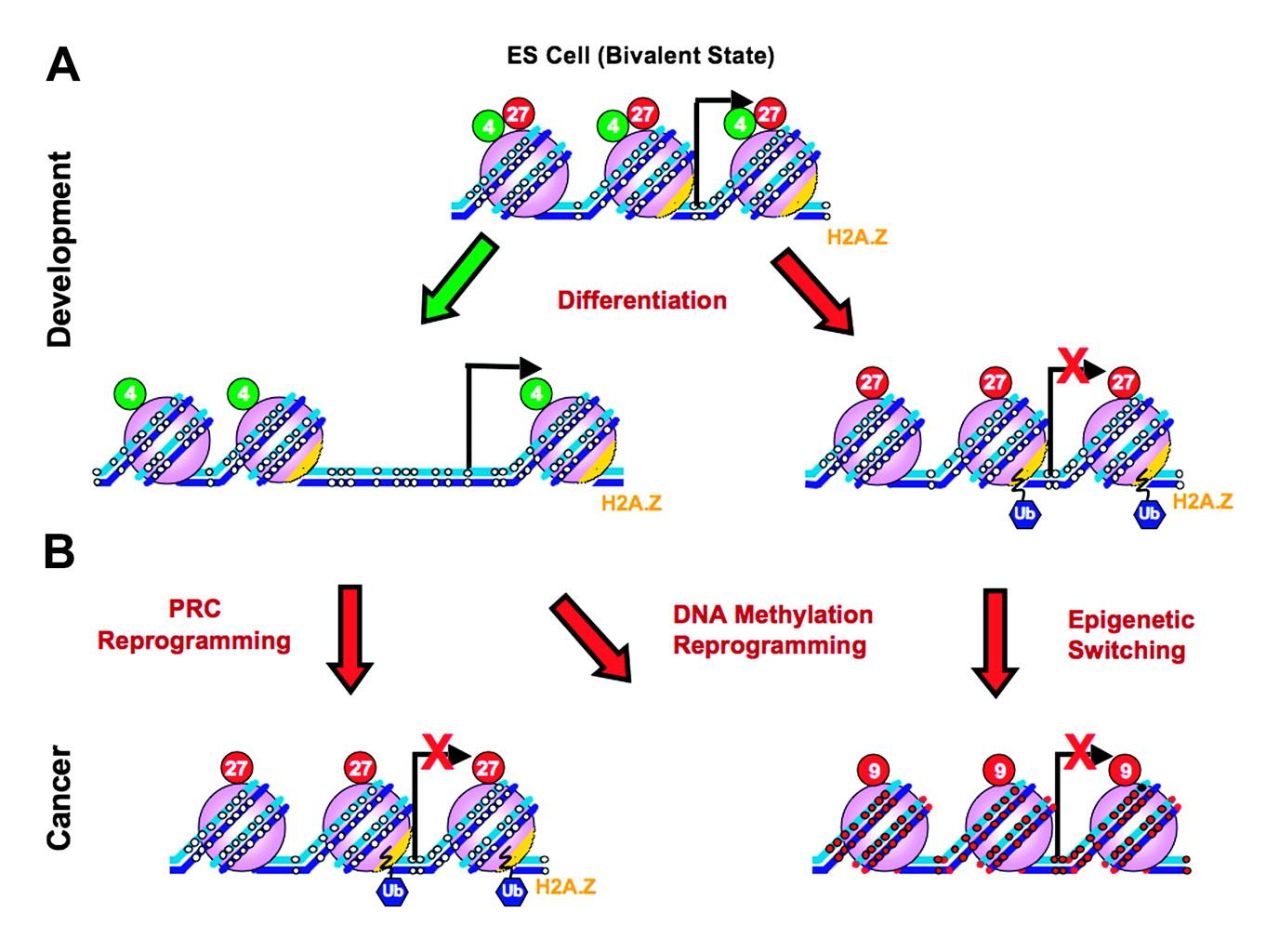
Diagram of Epigenetic Therapy.

Given the growing evidence of epigenetic involvement in neurological and psychiatric disorders, researchers are investigating epigenetic-based therapies. HDAC inhibitors, such as valproic acid and vorinostat, have been explored as potential treatments for Alzheimer's, Parkinson's, and Huntington's diseases due to their ability to enhance gene expression related to neuronal survival and synaptic plasticity.

Similarly, DNA methylation inhibitors, such as 5-azacytidine and RG108, are being investigated for their potential to reverse hypermethylation of critical genes in disorders like schizophrenia and Alzheimer's disease. However, challenges remain in developing targeted epigenetic therapies that selectively modify disease-relevant genes without causing widespread epigenetic disruption.

MicroRNA-based therapies are also under exploration, with strategies including miRNA mimics to restore deficient microRNAs or miRNA inhibitors (antagomirs) to suppress overexpressed microRNAs in disease contexts. For example, miR-132 mimics have shown promise in restoring synaptic function in Alzheimer's disease models, while miR-137 modulators are being explored for potential schizophrenia treatments.
