= TDH =

TDH can refer to:

- Terre des hommes, Swiss children's rights charity organisation
- Total dynamic head
- L-threonine dehydrogenase
- Turkey's Change Movement (Turkish: Türkiye Değişim Hareketi), a Turkish political party
- (+)-Thujan-3-ol dehydrogenase, an enzyme
- TDH (news agency), Turkmenistan
- TommyLee Dauphinais Howard, rapper
