= KBL =

KBL may refer to:

- Kumari Bank Limited, a commercial bank of Nepal
- Kabul International Airport, IATA airport code for the airport in Kabul, Afghanistan
- Karnataka Bank Limited
- Kirloskar Brothers Limited, a leading Pump manufacturer of India
- KBL, a cable/DBS channel in Pittsburgh, Pennsylvania, now known as SportsNet Pittsburgh
- KBL European Private Bankers, one of Europe's largest onshore private banking groups, headquartered in Luxembourg
- Kikki, Bettan & Lotta, a Swedish-Norwegian super trio, active 2001-2004 and consisting Kikki Danielsson, Elisabeth "Bettan" Andreassen and Lotta Engberg
- Kilusang Bagong Lipunan, a political party in the Philippines
- Korean Basketball League, the professional men's basketball league in South Korea
- Kotha Bangaru Lokam, a 2008 Telugu film
- Glycine C-acetyltransferase, an enzyme
- Kadyos, baboy, kag langka, a stew made from pigeon peas, pork, and jackfruit from the Philippines
