= Zbtb7 =

Mammalian protein found in Homo sapiens

Zbtb7, whose protein product is also known as Pokemon, is a gene that functions as a regulator of cellular growth and a proto oncogene.

Zbtb7 is a member of the POK (POZ and Krüppel) family of genes, and the ZBTB protein family that contains zinc finger and BTB domains. It is also known as LRF10 (leukemia/lymphoma-related factor), OCZF11 (osteoclast-derived zinc finger), and FBI1 (1-3) (fourteen-three-three beta interactant).

Zbtb7 is a transcription factor that regulates pathways involved in cell growth and transcription and it specifically represses many activities. When this gene binds to a consensus sequence, it prevents transcription by controlling the conformation of chromatin and bringing other transcription factors to gene regulation sites. This gene controls access to gene transcription regulation regions. Zbtb7 prevents SP1, a transcription factor, from binding to DNA which will halt the process of transcribing DNA to RNA. Downstream effects of Zbtb7 activity include failure to transcribe ARF, a critical tumor suppressor. Zbtb7 is also involved in the regulation of p53, another tumor suppressor gene. As an oncogene, Zbtb7 is overexpressed in many types of cancer, including lung, liver, prostate, and oral.

== Oncogenic studies on Zbtb7 ==
In initial studies using mouse embryonic fibroblasts, researchers found that in the absence of Zbtb7, cellular pathways that convert normal cells into tumor cells did not develop. However, when Zbtb7 was overexpressed, pathways for the transformation of normal cells to cancer cells resulted, both in vitro and in vivo. From these observations, researchers concluded that Zbtb7 is often overexpressed in human cancers, and so it can be used to understand biological pathways and patient prognosis.

The relationship between Zbtb7 and breast cancer has been investigated. Based on a clinical study, it was concluded that the expression of Zbtb7 is related to the severity of the grade of cancer. High expression of the gene was apparent in patients with grades II and III cancer, while low expression of the gene was found in patients with grade I and II tumors. Zbtb7 can also serve as a biomarker for patient survival. It was shown that patients with low expression of Zbtb7 were less likely to experience a recurrence in the following five years compared to those with high expression of the gene.

Consistent results were concluded in a later study investigating the relationship between Zbtb7 expression and transitional cell carcinoma (TCC) in the bladder. Higher expression of this gene was associated with later stage, more severe grade, higher recurrence, and lower survival. As a result, it is assumed that Zbtb7 expression may be related to the onset, growth, and proliferation of TCC tumors. Researchers stated that some of their data is not statistically significant due to a small sample size and failure to follow-up with patients, so further study is recommended to verify the relationship between Zbtb7 and TCC patient outcomes.

Zbtb7 has also been studied in association with renal carcinoma. The study indicated that Zbtb7 was present in abundance in renal carcinoma specimens and that overexpression of the gene was related to increases in cell growth and invasion into other cells and tissues. However, when Zbtb7 was silenced, this activity was not apparent. miR-137, a tumor suppressor miRNA was found to decrease the expression of Zbtb7. When Zbtb7 levels increase, it is capable of binding to the promoter region and preventing transcription of miR-137. Together, Zbtb7 and miR-137 form an autoregulatory loop that mediates the onset, growth, and spread of cancer.

Zbtb7 is abundantly expressed in colorectal cancer (CRC) as well. Treatment for CRC includes administration of 5-Fluorouracil (5-FU), chemotherapy also used to treat other cancers, such as pancreatic cancer and breast cancer. Some CRC patients have developed resistance to 5-FU. It has been shown that overexpression of Zbtb7 may increase 5-FU resistance through the NF-[kappa]B signaling pathway and thus allow for further proliferation of cancer cells. However, the introduction of SN50, an NF-[kappa]B inhibitor reverses resistance caused by Zbtb7. Therefore, the relationship between Zbtb7 and NF-[kappa]B may be important in reducing 5-FU resistance in CRC patients.

== Etymology ==
Pokemon is the name given to the protein product of Zbtb7 gene by the research team at Memorial Sloan Kettering Cancer Center (MSKCC), which discovered its oncogenic function. It stands for "POK erythroid myeloid ontogenic [sic] (Note: Spelled like this in the original article; likely a misspelling of oncogenic) factor" and is most likely a backronym of the Pokémon media franchise. The Pokémon Company threatened MSKCC with legal action in December 2005 for creating an association between cancer and the media franchise, and as a consequence MSKCC is now referring to it by its gene name Zbtb7.

== Genes ==
- ZBTB7A
- ZBTB7B

== See also ==
- Sonic hedgehog, a protein that is named after Sonic the Hedgehog, a video game character.
- Pikachurin, a retinal protein named after Pikachu, a Pokémon.
