= Obefazimod =

Experimental ulcerative colitis drug

Identifiers
- IUPAC name: 8-chloro-N-[4-(trifluoromethoxy)phenyl]quinolin-2-amine
- CAS Number: 1258453-75-6
- PubChem CID: 49846599
- DrugBank: DB14828
- ChemSpider: 34537418
- UNII: 26RU378B9V
- KEGG: D12345
- ChEMBL: ChEMBL4297344

Chemical and physical data
- Formula: C_{16}H_{10}ClF_{3}N_{2}O
- Molar mass: 338.71 g·mol^{−1}
- 3D model (JSmol): Interactive image
- SMILES: C1=CC2=C(C(=C1)Cl)N=C(C=C2)NC3=CC=C(C=C3)OC(F)(F)F
- InChI: InChI=1S/C16H10ClF3N2O/c17-13-3-1-2-10-4-9-14(22-15(10)13)21-11-5-7-12(8-6-11)23-16(18,19)20/h1-9H,(H,21,22); Key:OZOGDCZJYVSUBR-UHFFFAOYSA-N

Obefazimod is an investigational new drug that is being evaluated for the treatment of ulcerative colitis. It is miR-124 micro RNA upregulator. Obefazimod was developed by the French biotech company Abivax SA, whose shares rose by more than 500% when the phase 3 data showed promising results.
