= ZBTB7A =

Protein-coding gene in the species Homo sapiens

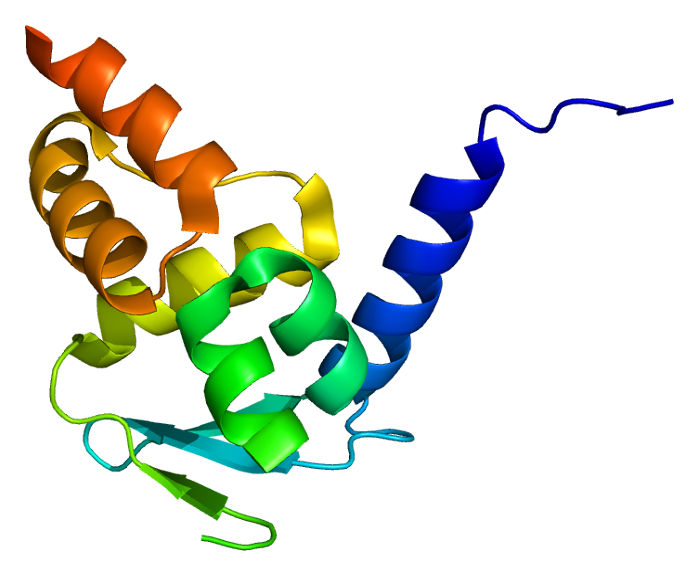

Identifiers
- Aliases: ZBTB7A, FBI-1, FBI1, LRF, ZBTB7, ZNF857A, pokemon, TIP21, zinc finger and BTB domain containing 7A, MNDLFH
- External IDs: OMIM: 605878; MGI: 1335091; GeneCards: ZBTB7A
Available structures
PDB	Ortholog search: PDBe RCSB
PDB	List of PDB id codes 2IF5, 2NN2

Gene location (Human)
Chr.	Chromosome 19 (human)
Band	19p13.3	Start	4,043,303 bp
Band	19p13.3	End	4,066,899 bp

Gene location (Mouse)
Chr.	Chromosome 10 (mouse)
Band	10|10 C1	Start	80,971,054 bp
Band	10|10 C1	End	80,988,829 bp
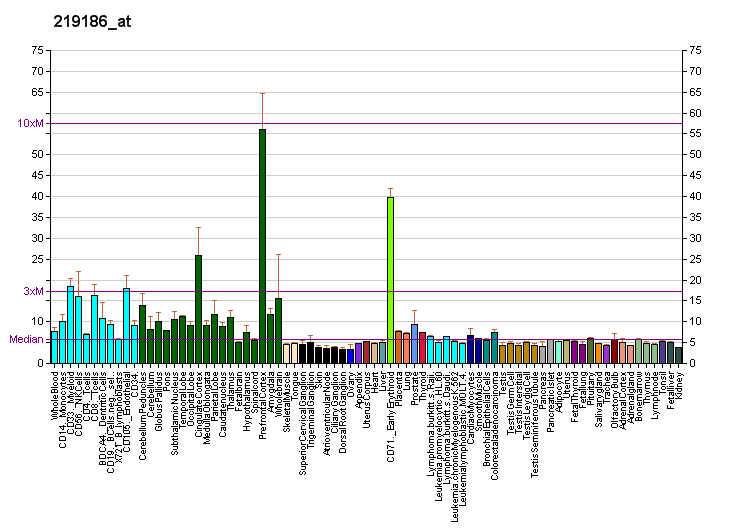

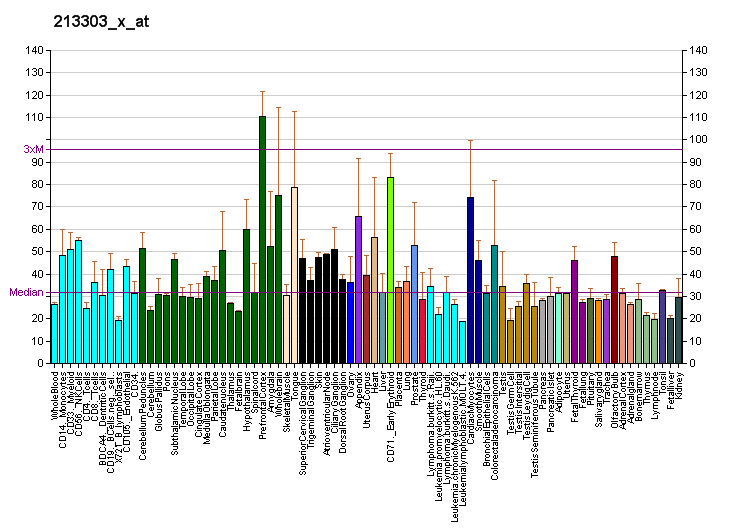

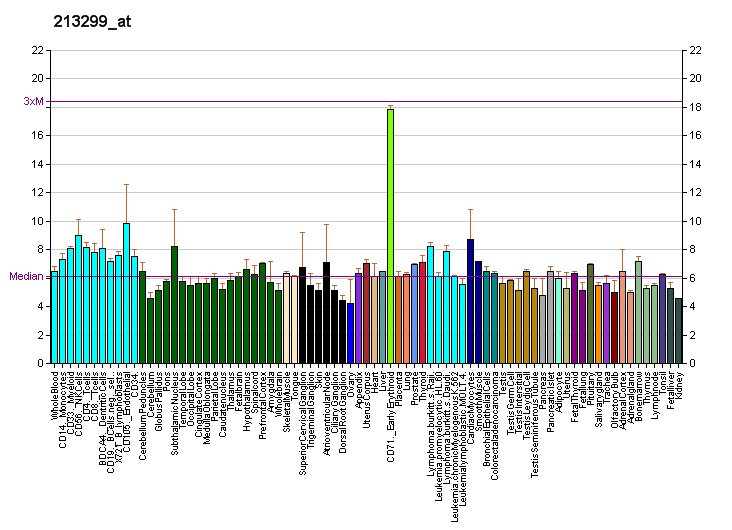
RNA expression pattern
Bgee	Human / Mouse (ortholog); Top expressed in: nipple; internal globus pallidus; middle temporal gyrus; pylorus; cerebellar vermis; Brodmann area 23; cardia; vulva; superior surface of tongue; ventral tegmental area / Top expressed in: ascending aorta; aortic valve; inner renal medulla; superior frontal gyrus; glomerulus; lip; granulocyte; right kidney; esophagus; cerebellar cortex; More reference expression data
BioGPS	More reference expression data
Gene ontology
Molecular function	RNA polymerase II cis-regulatory region sequence-specific DNA binding; DNA binding; DNA-binding transcription repressor activity, RNA polymerase II-specific; protein binding; histone acetyltransferase binding; metal ion binding; nucleic acid binding; DNA-binding transcription factor activity, RNA polymerase II-specific; transcription corepressor binding; DNA-binding transcription factor activity; transcription corepressor activity; sequence-specific DNA binding; SMAD binding; androgen receptor binding
Cellular component	nucleus; cytoplasm; NuRD complex; site of double-strand break; DNA-dependent protein kinase complex
Biological process	multicellular organism development; cell differentiation; negative regulation of transcription, DNA-templated; regulation of transcription, DNA-templated; negative regulation of transcription by RNA polymerase II; transcription, DNA-templated; regulation of alternative mRNA splicing, via spliceosome; regulation of glycolytic process; chromatin organization; chromatin remodeling; cellular response to DNA damage stimulus; B cell differentiation; negative regulation of transforming growth factor beta receptor signaling pathway; protein localization to nucleus; regulation of apoptotic process; erythrocyte maturation; fat cell differentiation; negative regulation of Notch signaling pathway; regulation of DNA-binding transcription factor activity; positive regulation of NF-kappaB transcription factor activity; negative regulation of androgen receptor signaling pathway; double-strand break repair via classical nonhomologous end joining; regulation of transcription regulatory region DNA binding
Sources:Amigo / QuickGO
Orthologs
Databases	NCBI: entry; OMA: entry
Species	Human	Mouse
Entrez	51341	16969
Ensembl	ENSG00000178951	ENSMUSG00000035011
UniProt	O95365	O88939
RefSeq (mRNA)	NM_015898; NM_001317990; NM_020224	NM_010731
RefSeq (protein)	NP_001304919; NP_056982	NP_034861; NP_001391790; NP_001391791; NP_001391792; NP_001391793 NP_001391794; NP_001391795; NP_001391796
Location (UCSC)	Chr 19: 4.04 – 4.07 Mb	Chr 10: 80.97 – 80.99 Mb
PubMed search
- Wikidata
View/Edit Human	View/Edit Mouse

Zinc finger and BTB domain-containing protein 7A is a protein that in humans is encoded by the ZBTB7A gene.

== Interactions ==
ZBTB7A has been shown to interact with BCL6.

== See also ==
- Zbtb7
