= Glycine C-acetyltransferase =

Identifiers
- EC no.: 2.3.1.29
- CAS no.: 37257-11-7

Databases
- IntEnz: IntEnz view
- BRENDA: BRENDA entry
- ExPASy: NiceZyme view
- KEGG: KEGG entry
- MetaCyc: metabolic pathway
- PRIAM: profile
- PDB structures: RCSB PDB PDBe PDBsum
- Gene Ontology: AmiGO / QuickGO
Search
- PMC: articles
- PubMed: articles
- NCBI: proteins

Glycine C-acetyltransferase (EC 2.3.1.29) is an enzyme that catalyzes the chemical reaction:

glycine
+
acetyl-CoA
(S)-2-amino-3-ketobutyric acid
+ coenzyme A

The two substrates of this enzyme are glycine and acetyl-CoA. Its products are (S)-2-amino-3-ketobutyric acid and coenzyme A.

This enzyme belongs to the family of transferases, specifically those acyltransferases transferring groups other than aminoacyl groups. The systematic name of this enzyme class is acetyl-CoA:glycine C-acetyltransferase. Other names in common use include 2-amino-3-ketobutyrate CoA ligase, 2-amino-3-ketobutyrate coenzyme A ligase, 2-amino-3-ketobutyrate-CoA ligase, glycine acetyltransferase, and aminoacetone synthase. This enzyme and L-threonine 3-dehydrogenase act together to degrade threonine to glycine. It employs one cofactor, pyridoxal phosphate.

== Structural studies ==
As of late 2007, only one structure has been solved for this class of enzymes, with the PDB accession code 1FC4.

== Human genes ==
- GCAT
