= ZBTB7B =

Protein-coding gene in humans

Identifiers
- Aliases: ZBTB7B, THPOK, ZBTB15, ZFP-67, ZFP67, ZNF857B, c-KROX, hcKROX, CKROX, zinc finger and BTB domain containing 7B
- External IDs: OMIM: 607646; MGI: 102755; GeneCards: ZBTB7B

Gene location (Human)
Chr.	Chromosome 1 (human)
Band	1q21.3	Start	155,002,630 bp
Band	1q21.3	End	155,018,523 bp

Gene location (Mouse)
Chr.	Chromosome 3 (mouse)
Band	3 F1|3 39.09 cM	Start	89,284,951 bp
Band	3 F1|3 39.09 cM	End	89,302,083 bp
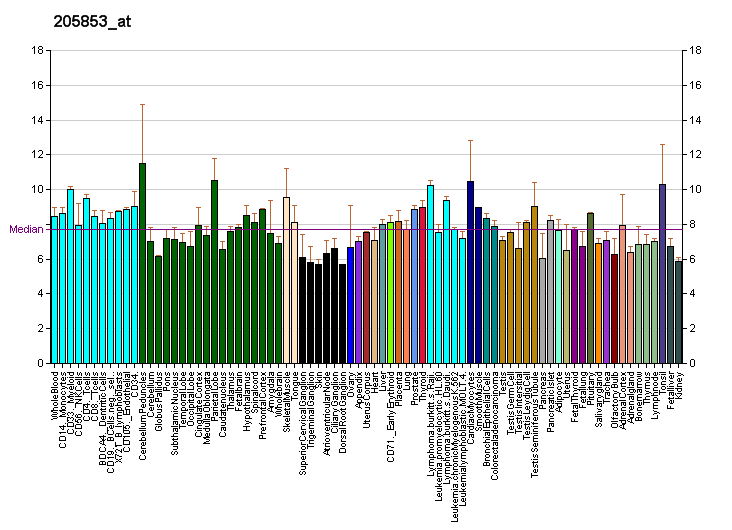
RNA expression pattern
Bgee	Human / Mouse (ortholog); Top expressed in: monocyte; mucosa of transverse colon; skin of abdomen; skin of leg; granulocyte; nipple; cardia; body of stomach; salivary gland; mucosa of pharynx / Top expressed in: granulocyte; pyloric antrum; lip; neural layer of retina; tibiofemoral joint; esophagus; lens; yolk sac; muscle of thigh; gastric mucosa; More reference expression data
BioGPS	More reference expression data
Gene ontology
Molecular function	DNA binding; protein binding; metal ion binding; nucleic acid binding; RNA polymerase II cis-regulatory region sequence-specific DNA binding; DNA-binding transcription activator activity, RNA polymerase II-specific; DNA-binding transcription factor activity; DNA-binding transcription factor activity, RNA polymerase II-specific; cis-regulatory region sequence-specific DNA binding; protein homodimerization activity; histone deacetylase binding
Cellular component	nucleus; nucleoplasm
Biological process	multicellular organism development; ectoderm development; cell differentiation; regulation of transcription, DNA-templated; transcription by RNA polymerase II; transcription, DNA-templated; regulation of CD4-positive, alpha-beta T cell differentiation; regulation of CD8-positive, alpha-beta T cell differentiation; positive regulation of transcription by RNA polymerase II; regulation of gene expression; negative regulation of T-helper 17 cell differentiation; lactation; positive regulation of gene expression; response to insulin; positive regulation of CD4-positive, alpha-beta T cell differentiation; negative regulation of CD8-positive, alpha-beta T cell differentiation; positive regulation of insulin receptor signaling pathway; positive regulation of brown fat cell differentiation; adaptive thermogenesis; positive regulation of SREBP signaling pathway; negative regulation of transcription by RNA polymerase II; NK T cell differentiation; negative regulation of gene expression; positive regulation of histone deacetylation; negative regulation of NK T cell proliferation; positive regulation of cold-induced thermogenesis
Sources:Amigo / QuickGO
Orthologs
Databases	NCBI: entry; OMA: entry
Species	Human	Mouse
Entrez	51043	22724
Ensembl	ENSG00000160685	ENSMUSG00000028042
UniProt	O15156	Q64321
RefSeq (mRNA)	NM_001252406; NM_001256455; NM_001377451; NM_001377452; NM_001377453 NM_001377454; NM_001377455	NM_009565; NM_001355206; NM_001355211; NM_001355212
RefSeq (protein)	NP_001239335; NP_001243384; NP_001364380; NP_001364381; NP_001364382 NP_001364383; NP_001364384	NP_033591; NP_001342135; NP_001342140; NP_001342141
Location (UCSC)	Chr 1: 155 – 155.02 Mb	Chr 3: 89.28 – 89.3 Mb
PubMed search
- Wikidata
View/Edit Human	View/Edit Mouse

Zinc finger and BTB domain-containing protein 7B is a protein that in humans is encoded by the ZBTB7B gene. ZFP67 is an early growth response gene that encodes a zinc finger-containing transcription factor that binds to the promoter regions of type I collagen genes (e.g. COL1A1; MIM 120150) and has a role in development.[supplied by OMIM]

== See also ==
- Zbtb7
