= Abivax =

French biotechnology company

- Type: Public (Société Anonyme)
- Traded as: Euronext Paris: ABVX; CAC Next 20
- ISIN: FR0012333284
- Industry: Biotechnology; Pharmaceutical
- Founded: 4 December 2013; 12 years ago
- Founder: Phillipe Pouletty
- Headquarters: Paris, France
- Key people: Marc de Garidel (CEO)
- Website: www.abivax.com

Abivax SA is a clinical stage biotechnology company focused on developing innovative treatments that harness the body’s natural regulatory mechanisms to modulate the immune response in patients with chronic inflammatory diseases.

Abivax has a program in clinical development with its lead drug candidate, obefazimod (formerly ABX464), to treat ulcerative colitis. Another program in Crohn’s disease is also in preparation and other potential inflammatory indications are being evaluated.

The company’s headquarters are based in Paris, France with a US office in Waltham, Massachusetts. Abivax’s Research and development work is conducted at its research center based in Montpellier, France.

== History ==
Abivax was founded in december 2013 in Paris, by the French immunologist Philippe Pouletty.

In 2015, Abivax launched its initial public offering on the stock market Euronext in Paris, raising EUR 57.7m, a record amount for a French biotechnology company on the Euronext in Paris.

In October 2023, Abivax launched its initial public offering (IPO) on the Nasdaq Global Market in the US, raising EUR 232m, the largest ever US IPO of a French listed biotech.

Initially, Abivax focused on the development of a novel treatment in HIV with lead drug candidate obefazimod. As the molecule showed a strong anti-inflammatory effect in preclinical models, Abivax decided to conduct a Phase 2a clinical study in ulcerative colitis, an inflammatory bowel disease (IBD). Based on the promising results of this clinical study in ulcerative colitis, the company decided to shift its focus towards the treatment of chronic inflammatory diseases.

August 2025, the stock price of Abivax surged by around 580% following dual Phase III success in ulcerative colitis. Hedge Funds who were invested in the company made substantial gains.

July 2026, the Company issued 7,360,000 American Depositary Shares (ADSs), raising $920 million, equivalent to approximately 807.4 million euros.

== Products ==
=== Obefazimod in inflammatory diseases ===
Abivax focuses on the treatment of inflammatory bowel diseases, namely ulcerative colitis and Crohn’s disease.

Its lead drug candidate, obefazimod, is an oral, first-in-class, small molecule that has demonstrated safety and tolerability as well as profound anti-inflammatory activity in preclinical as well as clinical trials in ulcerative colitis.

=== Obefazimod for the treatment of ulcerative colitis ===
Abivax’s lead drug candidate, obefazimod, has completed Phase 2a and Phase 2b clinical induction trials, investigating its anti-inflammatory effect and its potential ability to treat adults with moderately to severely active ulcerative colitis, as well as the corresponding follow-on open label extension studies.

Obefazimod is currently in Phase 3 clinical trials for the treatment of moderately to severely active ulcerative colitis ("ABTECT program").

1,200 UC patients across 36 countries in over 600 study sites will take part in the pivotal Phase 3 program that covers North America, Europe, Latin America, and Asia Pacific.

=== Obefazimod for the treatment of Crohn’s disease ===
Based on the encouraging safety profile and efficacy results observed with obefazimod in ulcerative colitis, Abivax is planning to initiate a Phase 2a clinical trial for the treatment of Crohn’s disease.

== Abivax research activities ==
Abivax is conducting all research and development work in Montpellier where some of the company’s staff is based at its collaborative laboratory. The scientists in Montpellier closely collaborate with the French National Center for Scientific Research (CNRS), the Institut Curie and the University of Montpellier.

== Notes ==
- "Abivax provides 2024 strategic outlook and lays out key milestones over next 12 months". BioSpace. January 22, 2024.
