= GCAT =

Protein-coding gene in the species Homo sapiens

Identifiers
- Aliases: GCAT, KBL, glycine C-acetyltransferase
- External IDs: OMIM: 607422; MGI: 1349389; GeneCards: GCAT
Enzyme activity
EC #	BRENDA	ExPASy	KEGG	MetaCyc
2.3.1.29	↗	↗	↗	↗
RNA expression pattern
Bgee	Human / Mouse (ortholog); Top expressed in: body of pancreas; right lobe of liver; left ventricle; oocyte; endothelial cell; prefrontal cortex; Brodmann area 9; amygdala; nucleus accumbens; cingulate gyrus / n/a; More reference expression data
BioGPS	n/a
Gene ontology
Molecular function	glycine C-acetyltransferase activity; transferase activity; pyridoxal phosphate binding; acyltransferase activity; catalytic activity
Cellular component	mitochondrion; nucleus; nucleoplasm; nuclear speck; mitochondrial inner membrane
Biological process	cellular amino acid metabolic process; metabolism; biosynthesis; threonine catabolic process; L-threonine catabolic process to glycine
Sources:Amigo / QuickGO
Orthologs
Databases	NCBI: entry
Species	Human	Mouse
Entrez	23464	26912
Ensembl	n/a	ENSMUSG00000006378
UniProt	O75600	O88986
RefSeq (mRNA)	NM_001171690; NM_014291	NM_001161712; NM_013847
RefSeq (protein)	NP_001165161; NP_055106	NP_001155184; NP_038875
Location (UCSC)	n/a	n/a
PubMed search
- Wikidata
View/Edit Human	View/Edit Mouse

Glycine C-acetyltransferase is a protein that in humans is encoded by the GCAT gene.

== Function ==
The degradation of L-threonine to glycine consists of a two-step biochemical pathway involving the enzymes L-threonine dehydrogenase and 2-amino-3-ketobutyrate coenzyme A ligase. L-Threonine is first converted into 2-amino-3-ketobutyrate by L-threonine dehydrogenase. This gene encodes the second enzyme in this pathway, which then catalyzes the reaction between 2-amino-3-ketobutyrate and coenzyme A to form glycine and acetyl-CoA. The encoded enzyme is considered a class II pyridoxal-phosphate-dependent aminotransferase. Alternate splicing results in multiple transcript variants. A pseudogene of this gene is found on chromosome 14.
