= (+)-Thujan-3-ol dehydrogenase =

Class of enzymes

Identifiers
- EC no.: 1.1.1.323

Databases
- IntEnz: IntEnz view
- BRENDA: BRENDA entry
- ExPASy: NiceZyme view
- KEGG: KEGG entry
- MetaCyc: metabolic pathway
- PRIAM: profile
- PDB structures: RCSB PDB PDBe PDBsum
Search
- PMC: articles
- PubMed: articles
- NCBI: proteins

(+)-Thujan-3-ol dehydrogenase (EC 1.1.1.323, d-3-thujanol dehydrogenase, TDH) is an enzyme with systematic name (+)-thujan-3-ol:NAD(P)^{+} oxidoreductase. This enzyme catalyses the following chemical reaction

(+)-thujan-3-ol + NAD(P)^{+} $\rightleftharpoons$ (+)-thujan-3-one + NAD(P)H + H^{+}

This enzyme is isolated from the plant Tanacetum vulgare.
