= BRPF1 =

Protein-coding gene in the species Mus musculus

Identifiers
- Aliases: BRPF1, BR140, bromodomain and PHD finger containing 1, IDDDFP
- External IDs: OMIM: 602410; MGI: 1926033; GeneCards: BRPF1
Available structures
PDB	Ortholog search: PDBe RCSB
PDB	List of PDB id codes 4QYD, 5C7N, 4QYL, 5FFW, 5FFY, 4LC2, 2X4Y, 2X35, 2RS9, 2D9E, 3MO8, 5FFV, 5FG4, 2X4X, 3L42, 5FG5, 2X4W, 5ERC, 4UYE, 5C6S, 5EWD, 5EVA, 5C89, 5C85, 5E3G, 5DYC, 5C87, 5G4S, 5DY7, 5EM3, 5ETB, 5G4R, 5EWC, 5EWH, 5DYA, 5EPS, 5E3D, 5EQ1, 5ETD, 5EPR, 5D7X, 5EV9

Gene location (Human)
Chr.	Chromosome 3 (human)
Band	3p25.3	Start	9,731,729 bp
Band	3p25.3	End	9,748,019 bp

Gene location (Mouse)
Chr.	Chromosome 6 (mouse)
Band	6|6 E3	Start	113,284,098 bp
Band	6|6 E3	End	113,301,821 bp
RNA expression pattern
Bgee	Human / Mouse (ortholog); Top expressed in: oocyte; secondary oocyte; granulocyte; gonad; monocyte; dorsal motor nucleus of vagus nerve; gingival epithelium; lower lobe of lung; bone marrow cell; left testis / Top expressed in: granulocyte; crypt of lieberkuhn of small intestine; Rostral migratory stream; Paneth cell; stroma of bone marrow; lacrimal gland; lobe of cerebellum; cerebellar vermis; lymph node; thymus; More reference expression data
BioGPS	n/a
Gene ontology
Molecular function	DNA binding; protein binding; metal ion binding; nucleic acid binding; histone acetyltransferase activity (H3-K23 specific)
Cellular component	MOZ/MORF histone acetyltransferase complex; nucleus; nucleoplasm; cytosol; plasma membrane; cytoplasm
Biological process	positive regulation of transcription, DNA-templated; regulation of transcription, DNA-templated; histone H3 acetylation; transcription, DNA-templated; regulation of signal transduction by p53 class mediator; histone H3-K23 acetylation; chromatin organization
Sources:Amigo / QuickGO
Orthologs
Databases	NCBI: entry; OMA: entry
Species	Human	Mouse
Entrez	7862	78783
Ensembl	ENSG00000156983	ENSMUSG00000001632
UniProt	P55201	B2RRD7
RefSeq (mRNA)	NM_001003694; NM_004634; NM_001319049; NM_001319050	NM_001282126; NM_001282127; NM_001282128; NM_030178
RefSeq (protein)	NP_001003694; NP_001305978; NP_001305979; NP_004625	NP_001269055; NP_001269056; NP_001269057; NP_084454
Location (UCSC)	Chr 3: 9.73 – 9.75 Mb	Chr 6: 113.28 – 113.3 Mb
PubMed search
- Wikidata
View/Edit Human	View/Edit Mouse

Peregrin also known as bromodomain and PHD finger-containing protein 1 is a protein that in humans is encoded by the BRPF1 gene located on 3p26-p25. Peregrin is a multivalent chromatin regulator that recognizes different epigenetic marks and activates three histone acetyltransferases (Moz, Morf and Hbo1). BRPF1 contains two PHD fingers, one bromodomain and one chromo/Tudor-related Pro-Trp-Trp-Pro (PWWP) domain.

== Function ==
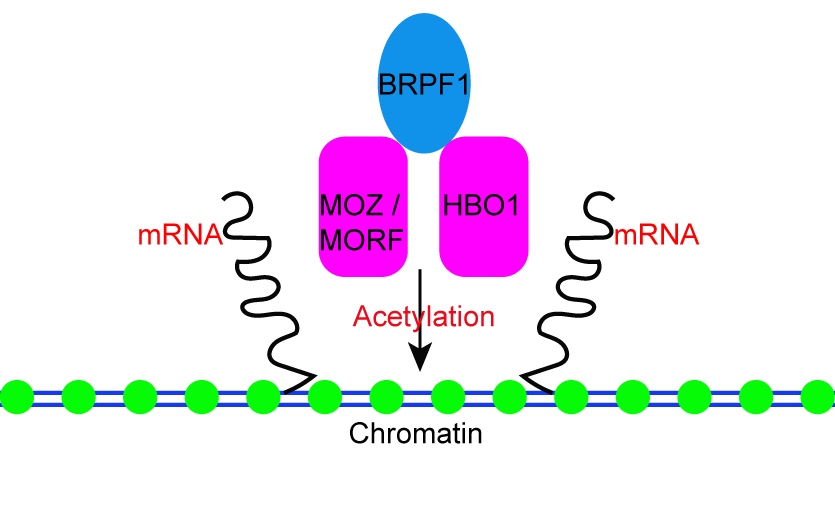
Brpf1 forms a stable complex with Moz/Morf-Hbo1 and targets to chromatin to regulate transcription.

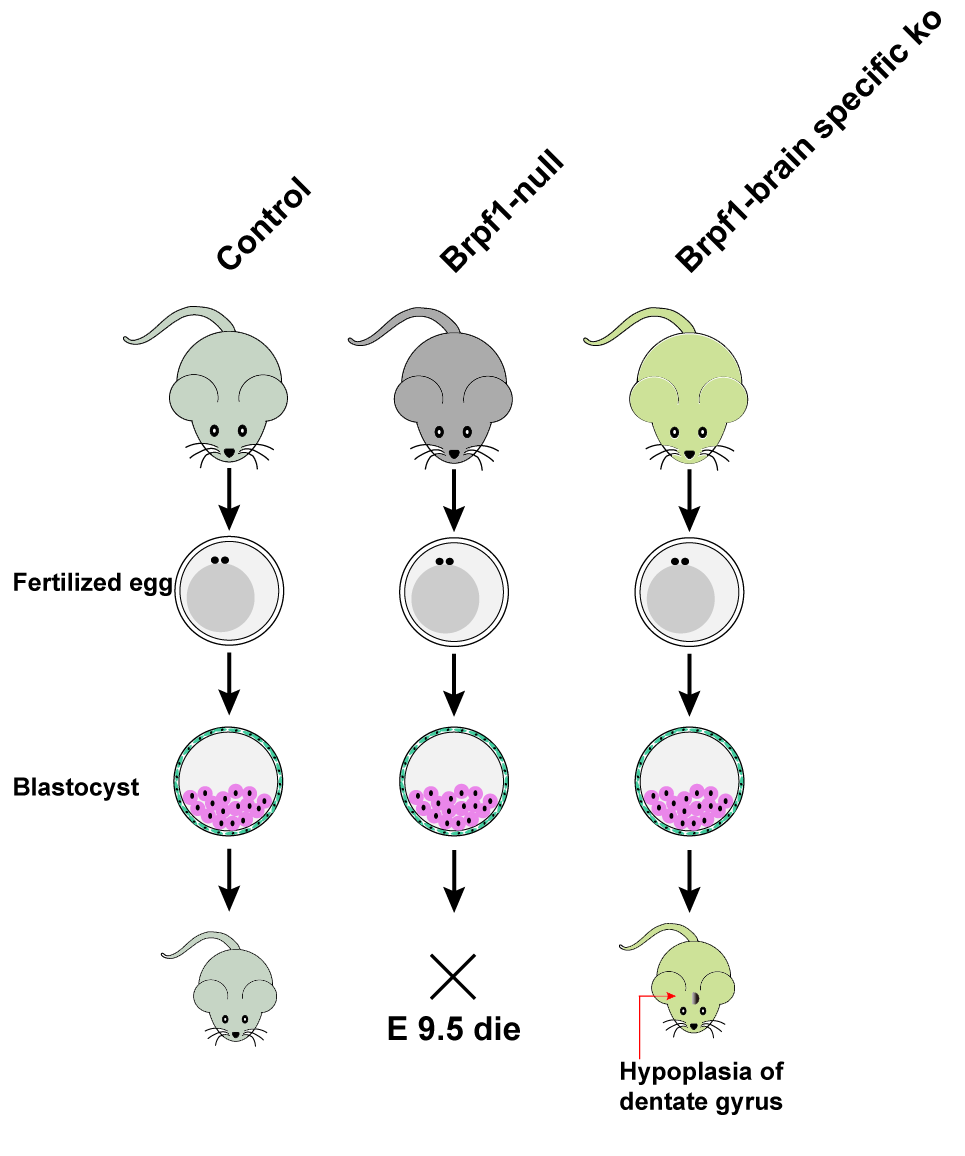
Brpf1 null mutant mouse dies at embryonic day 9.5. Forebrain-specific knock out of Brpf1 cause hypoplasia in the dentate gyrus of mouse.

=== Embryo development ===
Brpf1 gene is very conserved and has a critical role in different developmental processes. Zebrafish BRPF1, which is coordinated by its particular set of PWWP domains, mediates Moz -dependent histone acetylation and maintains Hox genes expression throughout vertebrate development, hence determines the proper pharyngeal segmental identities. Furthermore, Brpf1 may not only has significant role for maintaining the anterior-posterior axis of the craniofacial skeleton, but also the dorsal-ventral axis of the caudal skeleton. Recent studies have shown that ablation of the mouse Brpf1 gene causes embryonic lethality at embryonic day 9.5. Specifically, Brpf1 regulates placenta vascular formation, neural tube closure, primitive hematopoiesis and embryonic fibroblast proliferation.

For the central nervous system, Brpf1 has high expression and is essential for the development of several important structures, including neocortex and dentate gyrus in the hippocampus. Brpf1 is dynamically expressed during forebrain development, especially the hippocampal neurogenesis. Brpf1 shares phenotypes with transcription factors Sox2, Tlx and Tbr2 in dentate gyrus development and has potential link to neural stem cells and progenitors. Except for the forebrain, Brpf1 is also required for the proper patterning of the craniofacial cartilage, which is derived from neural crest cells that migrate from the hindbrain.

=== Cancer development ===
Recently, Brpf1 was reported to play the tumor suppressor or oncogenic role in several malignant tumors, including leukemia, medulloblastoma and endometrial stromal sarcoma. Brpf1 was considered a tumor suppressor gene because mutations in cancer cells appear to diminish the function of Brpf1 However, oncogenic role of Brpf1 is also possible in cancer. For example, Brpf1 can form a stable complex with Moz-Tif2, which could lead to the development of human acute myeloid leukemia (AML). There is another Brpf1 related complex Brpf1–Ing5–Eaf6, which also plays a direct role in cancer.

== See also ==
- Pattern formation
- Regional specification
