= Mir-9/mir-79 microRNA precursor family =

Precursor microRNA family

mir-9
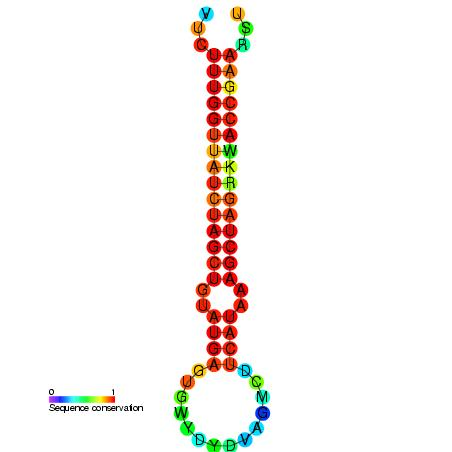
- miR-9 microRNA secondary structure and sequence conservation.

Identifiers
- Symbol: mir-9
- Rfam: RF00237
- miRBase family: MIPF0000014
- HGNC: 31641
- OMIM: 611186

Other data
- RNA type: microRNA
- Domain: Eukaryota;
- PDB structures: PDBe

The miR-9 microRNA (homologous to miR-79), is a short non-coding RNA gene involved in gene regulation. The mature ~21nt miRNAs are processed from hairpin precursor sequences by the Dicer enzyme. The dominant mature miRNA sequence is processed from the 5' arm of the mir-9 precursor, and from the 3' arm of the mir-79 precursor. The mature products are thought to have regulatory roles through complementarity to mRNA. In vertebrates, miR-9 is highly expressed in the brain, and is suggested to regulate neuronal differentiation. A number of specific targets of miR-9 have been proposed, including the transcription factor REST and its partner CoREST.

== Species distribution ==
miR-9 has been identified in Drosophila (MI0000129), mouse (MI0000720) and human (MI0000466), and the related miR-79 in C. elegans (MI0000050) and Drosophila melanogaster (MI0000374).

== Role in disease ==
microRNAs have been implicated in human cancer in a number of studies. It has been shown that human miR-9 expression levels are reduced in many breast cancer samples due to hypermethylation an epigenetic modification. Hildebrandt et al. show that two genes encoding for has-miR-9 are significantly hypermethylated in clear cell renal carcinoma tumours.
