= Neurogenin-1 =

Protein-coding gene

NEUROG1

Identifiers
- Aliases: NEUROG1, AKA, Math4C, NEUROD3, bHLHa6, ngn1, neurogenin 1
- External IDs: OMIM: 601726; MGI: 107754; GeneCards: NEUROG1

Gene location (Human)
Chr.	Chromosome 5 (human)
Band	5q31.1	Start	135,534,282 bp
Band	5q31.1	End	135,535,964 bp

Gene location (Mouse)
Chr.	Chromosome 13 (mouse)
Band	13 B1|13 30.06 cM	Start	56,398,291 bp
Band	13 B1|13 30.06 cM	End	56,399,976 bp
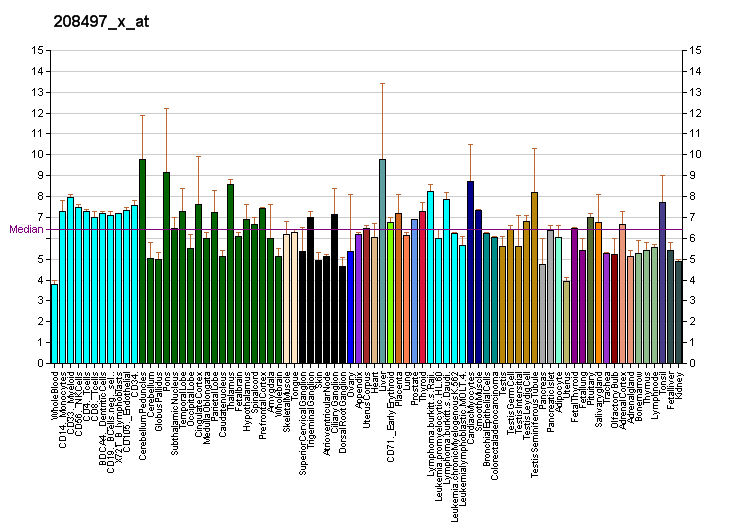
RNA expression pattern
Bgee	Human / Mouse (ortholog); Top expressed in: ganglionic eminence; ventricular zone; right ovary / Top expressed in: ventricular zone; urethra; female urethra; male urethra; rhombic lip; hair; trigeminal ganglion; Jacobson's organ; embryo; pretectal area; More reference expression data
BioGPS	More reference expression data
Gene ontology
Molecular function	DNA binding; protein dimerization activity; DNA-binding transcription factor activity; chromatin binding; protein binding; protein homodimerization activity; E-box binding; sequence-specific double-stranded DNA binding; DNA-binding transcription factor activity, RNA polymerase II-specific
Cellular component	perikaryon; soma; nucleus
Biological process	regulation of neuron differentiation; neurogenesis; cell differentiation; cell fate commitment; regulation of transcription, DNA-templated; regulation of transcription by RNA polymerase II; positive regulation of DNA-binding transcription factor activity; positive regulation of exit from mitosis; transcription, DNA-templated; nervous system development; multicellular organism development; positive regulation of neuron differentiation; neuron differentiation; positive regulation of transcription by RNA polymerase II; thorax and anterior abdomen determination; trigeminal nerve development; vestibulocochlear nerve formation; peristalsis; auditory behavior; genitalia morphogenesis; inner ear morphogenesis; regulation of muscle organ development; genitalia development; inner ear development; neuromuscular process controlling balance; mastication; cochlea development; cochlea morphogenesis; craniofacial suture morphogenesis; learned vocalization behavior; negative regulation of relaxation of muscle; negative regulation of saliva secretion; hard palate morphogenesis
Sources:Amigo / QuickGO
Orthologs
Databases	NCBI: entry; OMA: entry
Species	Human	Mouse
Entrez	4762	18014
Ensembl	ENSG00000181965	ENSMUSG00000048904
UniProt	Q92886	P70660
RefSeq (mRNA)	NM_006161	NM_010896
RefSeq (protein)	NP_006152	NP_035026
Location (UCSC)	Chr 5: 135.53 – 135.54 Mb	Chr 13: 56.4 – 56.4 Mb
PubMed search
- Wikidata
View/Edit Human	View/Edit Mouse

Neurogenin-1 is a protein that in humans is encoded by the NEUROG1 gene.

== Interactions ==
NEUROG1 has been shown to interact with CREB-binding protein and decapentaplegic homolog 1.
