= Mir-124 microRNA precursor family =

miR-124 microRNA precursor family
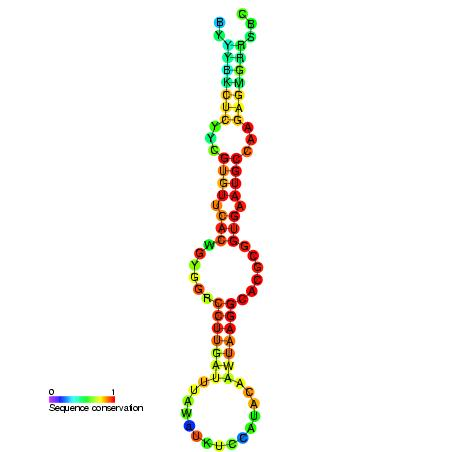
- Predicted secondary structure and sequence conservation of mir-124

Identifiers
- Symbol: mir-124
- Rfam: RF00239
- miRBase: MI0000443
- miRBase family: MIPF0000021

Other data
- RNA type: Gene; miRNA
- Domain: Eukaryota
- GO: GO:0035195 GO:0035068
- SO: SO:0001244
- PDB structures: PDBe

The miR-124 microRNA precursor is a small non-coding RNA molecule that has been identified in flies (MI0000373), nematode worms (MI0000302), mouse (MI0000150) and human (MI0000443). The mature ~21 nucleotide microRNAs are processed from hairpin precursor sequences by the Dicer enzyme, and in this case originates from the 3′ arm. miR-124 has been found to be the most abundant microRNA expressed in neuronal cells. Experiments to alter expression of miR-124 in neural cells did not appear to affect differentiation. However these results are controversial since other reports have described a role for miR-124 during neuronal differentiation.

== Targets of miR-124 ==
- Visvanathan et al. showed that miR-124 targets the mRNA of the anti-neural function protein SCP1 (small C-terminal domain phosphatase 1).
- Makeyev et al. showed that miR-124 directly targets PTBP1 (PTB/hnRNP I) mRNA, which encodes a global repressor of alternative pre-mRNA splicing in non-neuronal cells.
- Arrant et al. wrote that miR-124 changes glutamate receptor composition in the prefrontal cortex and can decrease social dysfunction in frontotemporal dementia.

== Clinical medicine ==
Presence of the G allele, compared to the C allele, in SNP rs531564 in pri-miR-124-1, measured by PCR-RFLP in leukocyte DNA, is linked to a reduced risk of gastric cancer (e.g. GG v CC OR 0.34 95% CI 0.19-0.59, p<0.001).
