= Mir-184 =

Non-coding microRNA molecule

mir-184
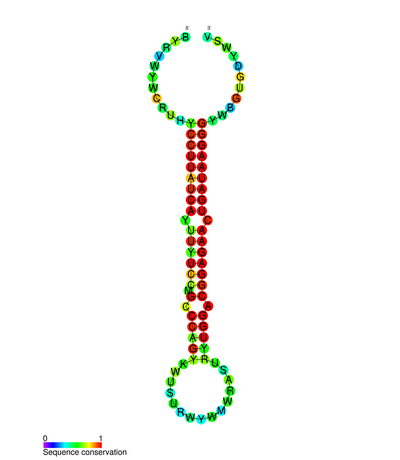
- miR-184 microRNA secondary structure and sequence conservation

Identifiers
- Symbol: mir-184
- Rfam: RF00657
- miRBase family: MIPF0000059
- NCBI Gene: 406960
- HGNC: 31555
- OMIM: 613146

Other data
- RNA type: microRNA
- Domain(s): Eukaryota; Chordata
- PDB structures: PDBe

In molecular biology, miR-184 microRNA is a short non-coding RNA molecule. MicroRNAs (miRNAs) function as posttranscriptional regulators of expression levels of other genes by several mechanisms. Several targets for miR-184 have been described, including that of mediators of neurological development, apoptosis and it has been suggested that miR-184 plays an essential role in development.

MicroRNAs can bind to the three prime untranslated region (3'UTR) of the target messenger RNA (mRNA). Binding of the miRNA can hinder translation of mRNA by promoting degradation or inducing deadenylation.

== Genomic location ==
miR-184 is a single copy gene and evolutionarily conserved at the nucleotide level from flies to humans. In humans, miR-184 is located within region 25.1 on the q-arm of chromosome 15, and its corresponding transcript is comparatively small (84bp) which is not encoded near other clustered miRNAs. In the mouse genome, miR-184 is located in an imprinted locus on mouse chromosome 9, and it is 55 kb away from the nearest coding gene.

The genomic region immediately surrounding miR-184 does not contain a classic CpG island, but does contain several CpG-rich sequences that are suitable for MBD1 binding.

== Expression ==
miR-184 displays a tissue- and developmental-specific expression pattern. In mammals, mature miR-184 is particularly enriched in the brain and testis, along with the corneal epithelium. Depolarization of cortical neurons results in pri-miR-184 expression in an allele specific manner. High expression is observed in suprabasal cells of the corneal epithelium in the mouse model, along with expression in mouse testis and brain tissue. In Zebrafish, it is expressed in lens, hatching gland and epidermis (shown by Northern blot). miR-184 is expressed ubiquitously in Drosophila embryos, larvae and adults, and its expression pattern displays dynamic changes during the development of embryo, especially in the central nervous system. However, the temporal and spatial expression pattern of miR-184 is still being debated.

== Role in neuronal cells ==
C. Liu et al. showed that Methyl-CpG binding protein 1 (MBD1) regulates the expression of several miRNAs in adult neural stem/progenitor cells (aNSCs) and, specifically, that miR-184 is directly repressed by MBD1. High levels of miR-184 promotes cell proliferation but inhibits differentiation of aNSCs, whereas inhibition of miR-184 rescued phenotypes associated with MBD1 deficiency.

Numblike (Numbl) is known to be important in embryonic neural stem cell function and cortical brain development and has been identified as a downstream target of miR-184. It has been found that exogenously expressed Numbl could rescue aNSC proliferation and differentiation deficits resulting from either elevated miR-184 or MBD1 deficiency.

== Other Targets ==
An analysis of the primary transcript of miR-184 (pri-mir-184) in several mouse tissues revealed specific expression in the brain and testis. Its expression is repressed by the binding of methyl-CpG binding protein 2 (MeCP2) to its promoter, but is upregulated by the release of MeCP2 after depolarization, suggesting a link between miRNAs and DNA methylation pathways . J. Yu et al. demonstrated that the lipid phosphatase SH2-containing phosphoinositide 5'phosphatase 2 (SHIP2) is a target of miRNA-205 (miR-205) in epithelial cells, and that the corneal epithelial-specific miR-184 can interfere with the ability of miR-205 to suppress SHIP2 levels. The mechanism by which miR-184 negatively regulates miR-205 appears to be unique, and is the first example of a miRNA negatively regulating another to maintain levels of a target protein. miR-184 does not directly affect SHIP2 translation, but instead prevents miR-205 from interacting with SHIP2 mRNA. Interfering with miR-205 function by using a synthetic antagomir, or by the ectopic expression of miR-184, is thought to lead to a coordinated damping of the Akt signaling pathway via SHIP2 induction.

R. Weitzel et al. showed that miR-184 mediates NFAT1 translational regulation in umbilical cord blood (UCB) graft CD4+ T-cells leading to blunted allogenic responses.

J. Roberts et al. found that miR-184 repressed the expression of Argonaute 2 in epidermal keratinocytes. Similarly, Tattikota et al. showed miR-184 reduced Argonaute 2 levels in the MIN6 mouse pancreatic beta islet cell line.

Furthermore, miR-184 has multiple roles in Drosophila female germline development.

Finally, a recent study identified miR-184 as essential for embryonic corneal commitment of pluripotent stem cells.

== Disease relevance ==
• A single base mutation in the seed region of miR-184 causes EDICT syndrome, a hereditary eye disease.

• A mutation altering the miR-184 seed region causes familial keratoconus with cataract.

• Rett syndrome.

• Several forms of cancer (see below) including elevation of miR-184 levels in squamous cell carcinoma of the tongue. All-trans-retinoic acid induces miR-184 expression in neuroblastoma cell line and ectopic miR-184 causes apoptosis.

• miR-184 has been implicated in ischemia-induced retinal neovascularization.

=== Angiogenesis and cancer ===
Dysregulation of miRNA expression is thought to play a part in abnormal gene expression in cancer cells, and miR-184 has been implicated in several forms of cancer. MYCN has been found to contribute to tumorigenesis, in part, by repressing miR-184, leading to increased levels of the serine/threonine kinase, AKT2. AKT2 is a major effector of the phosphatidylinositol 3-kinase (PI3K) pathways, one of the most potent survival pathways in cancer, and is a direct target of miR-184. It has been suggested that MYCN provides a tumourigenic effect, in part, by protecting AKT2 mRNA from degradation by miR-184, permitting the PI3K pathway to remain functional.

miR-184 has been found to be significantly increased in the tumor cells in comparison with the normal epithelial cells of the tongue. High miR-184 levels were not only detected in the tumor tissues, but also in the plasma of patients with tongue squamous cell carcinoma (SCC). Decreased plasma levels of miR-184 were observed in patients after surgical removal of the primary tumor, suggesting that it is a potential oncogenic miRNA in tongue SCC. Inhibiting miR-184 promotes apoptosis as well as hindering cell proliferation in cultured tongue SCC cells. Furthermore, over expression of miR-184 in neuroblastoma cell lines results in apoptosis. SND1 expression is regulated by miR-184 in gliomas.

== See also ==
- MicroRNA
