= MiR-137 =

miR-137
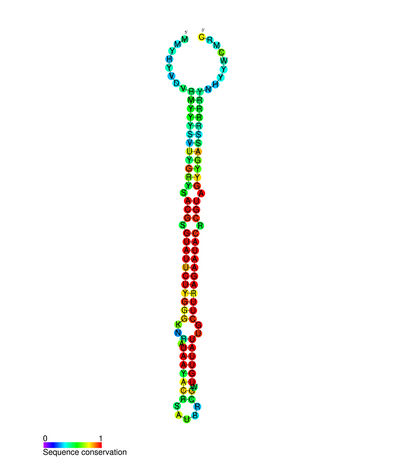
- miR-137 microRNA secondary structure and sequence conservation

Identifiers
- Symbol: mir-137
- Rfam: RF00694
- miRBase family: MIPF0000106
- NCBI Gene: 406928
- HGNC: 31523

Other data
- RNA type: microRNA
- Domain(s): Eukaryota; Metazoa;
- PDB structures: PDBe

In molecular biology, miR-137 (or microRNA-137) is a short non-coding RNA molecule that functions to regulate the expression levels of other genes by various mechanisms. miR-137 is located on human chromosome 1p22 and has been implicated to act as a tumor suppressor in several cancer types including colorectal cancer, squamous cell carcinoma and melanoma via cell cycle control.

Recent genome-wide association studies (GWAS) have provided evidence to suggest that single nucleotide polymorphisms in the vicinity of the MIR137 gene are statistically associated with schizophrenia and other psychiatric disorders.

miR-137 is shown to regulate neural stem cell proliferation and differentiation in mouse embryonic stem cells, and neuronal maturation, including regulation of dendrite length, branch points, end points, and spine density in mouse adult hippocampal neuroprogenitor-derived and mouse fetal hippocampus neurons. Decreased spine density has also been observed in the dorsolateral cortex of patients with schizophrenia.

miR-137 belongs to the miR-137 clan (a clan is group of two or more RNA families that have arisen from a single evolutionary origin, as derived from their related structure and function). The miR-137 clan contains two members: miR-137 and miR-234; the total number of RNA domains in the clan is 112.

== Chromosomal location and transcription ==
miR-137 is located on chromosome 1p22 within the non-protein-coding RNA gene AK094607. It is transcribed as a non-coding primary miRNA (pri-miRNA) transcript, which is then processed into precursor miRNA (pre-miRNA) and finally into the mature and functional miRNA of 21 to 25 nucleotides. The mature miRNA functions by binding to the 3' untranslated region (3' UTR) of multiple target mRNAs. This binding in turn results in an inhibition of translation of the target protein or degradation of the target messenger RNA.

The post-transcriptional processing of microRNA-137 can be altered by presence of a 15-bp variable nucleotide tandem repeat in the primary miRNA transcript, which leads to change in folding and the secondary structure of miR-137. This alteration is believed to cause inefficient processing of miR-137 to its mature form, and serve as a mechanism to downregulate miR-137 expression in various human melanoma cell lines.

== Expression pattern ==
miR-137 has been reported to be enriched in neurons. In particular, in situ hybridisation showed an enhanced expression of miR-137 within the dentate gyrus and the molecular layer of adult hippocampus, a region of the brain with significant plasticity and continuous production of new neurons.

miR-137 is also found to be constitutively expressed in normal colonic epithelium in humans.

== Epigenetic regulation and cancers ==
miR-137 is embedded within a CpG island, a genomic region containing high frequency of CpG dinucleotides, and is reported to be frequently silenced by promoter hyper-methylation in many tumour types, including colorectal, gastric, breast and squamous cell carcinoma of the head and neck.

miR-137 is epigenetically silenced in colorectal adenomatous tissues to the same extent as in colorectal cancer tissues, suggesting that methylation of miRNA is an early event in colorectal carcinogenesis.

Analysis of promoter methylation in oral rinses of patients with squamous cell carcinoma of the head and neck showed that miR-137 methylation is associated with female gender and inversely associated with body mass index. Furthermore, epigenetic alteration of miR-137 appears to be frequently detected in patients' oral rinses and may serve as a future biomarker in DNA methylation panels.

== Targets ==
Several target genes of miR-137 have been documented and shown to play important roles in various human cancers, cell cycle signalling and mouse embryonic stem cell development.

Balaguer et al. identified a list of 32 genes targeted by miR-137 by cross-referencing the global gene expression analysis of HCT 116 colorectal carcinoma cells after transfection of miR-137 with the list of predicted miR-137 targets via miRecords database. Among these targets, LSD1 (Lysine-specific histone demethylase 1A, also known as KDM1A) has been shown to be directly downregulated by miR-137 via binding to its 3'UTR. LSD1 is implicated in maintaining the undifferentiated phenotype of prostate cancer and neuroblastoma, thereby promoting tumour growth. It is thus postulated that miR-137 plays a tumour suppressive role by negatively modulating LSD1 protein expression.

Liu et al. further showed that miR-137 targets Cdc42 (cell division cycle 42), a well-known member of the Rho GTPase family found be upregulated in many human cancer types such as colorectal, testicular and breast cancers. In particular, the target site for miR-137 in the Cdc42 3' UTR is highly conserved across various species including human, chimpanzee, mouse, rat, dog and chicken. By inhibiting the Cdc42/PAK signalling pathway, miR-137 decreases proliferation, invasion and G0/G1 cell cycle progression of colorectal cancer cells.

miR-137 has also been shown to directly inhibits CDK6 (Cyclin-dependent kinase 6) expression and decreases the level of phosphorylated RB (retinoblastoma), a known CDK6 downstream target. This is proposed to be the mechanism whereby miR-137 induces differentiation and inhibits proliferation of adult mouse neural stem cells, oligodendroma-derived stem cells, as well as human glioblastoma multiforme-derived stem cells. In addition, miR-137 targets Mib1 (Mind Bomb-1), a ubiquitin ligase known to be important for neurogenesis and neurodevelopment.

Another notable target of miR-137 is MITF (Micropthalmia Associated Transcription Factor), a master regulator of melanocyte development and function that is thought to be frequently misregulated in human melanomas. It is proposed that miR-137 also acts as a tumour suppressor in melanoma cells by down-regulating both MITF and CDK6.

In mouse embryonic stem cells (ESCs), Jarid1b (also known as KDM5b, a histone H3 Lysine 4 demethylase) has recently been shown to be another direct target of miR-137. Jarid1b is frequently expressed early in mouse embryonic development and is thought to maintain the expression of undifferentiated ESC markers. By suppressing Jarid1b protein level, miR-137 is believed to play a role in modulating the differentiated state of mouse ESCs.

Stephan Ripke et al. have identified fourteen target sites predicted by TargetScan: C6orf47 (open reading frame of chromosome 6), HLA-DQA1 (Major histocompatibility complex, class II, DQ alpha 1), TNXB (A member of the tenascin family, also known as hexabrachion-like protein is a glycoprotein that is expressed in connective tissues including skin, joints and muscles) VARS (Valyl-tRNA synthetase), WBP1L (WW domain binding protein 1-like), CACNA1C (Calcium channel, voltage-dependent, L type, alpha 1C subunit), DPYD (Dihydropyrimidine dehydrogenase [NADP+]), CACNB2 (Voltage-dependent L-type calcium channel subunit beta-2), TSSK6 (Testis-Specific Serine Kinase 6), NT5DC2 (Cytosolic 5'-nucleotidase), PITPNM2 (Membrane-associated phosphatidylinositol transfer protein 2), SBNO1 (strawberry notch homolog 1), ZEB2 (Zinc finger E-box-binding homeobox 2) and PRKD3 (Serine/threonine-protein kinase D3).

Neault et al. recently identified miR-137 as a senescence effector miRNA induced by oncogenic Ras. More specifically, miR-137 inhibits KDM4A, a histone lysine demethylase participating in gene repression and the bypass of oncogene-induced senescence in vivo. KDM4A targets CHD5, a tumour suppressor and positive regulator p53 expression. It was observed that miR-137 expression is lost in Ras-dependent pancreatic cancer, and that restoration of its expression leads to cellular growth arrest and senescence in pancreatic cancer cells.

== See also ==
- MicroRNA
