= CTDSP1 =

Protein-coding gene in humans

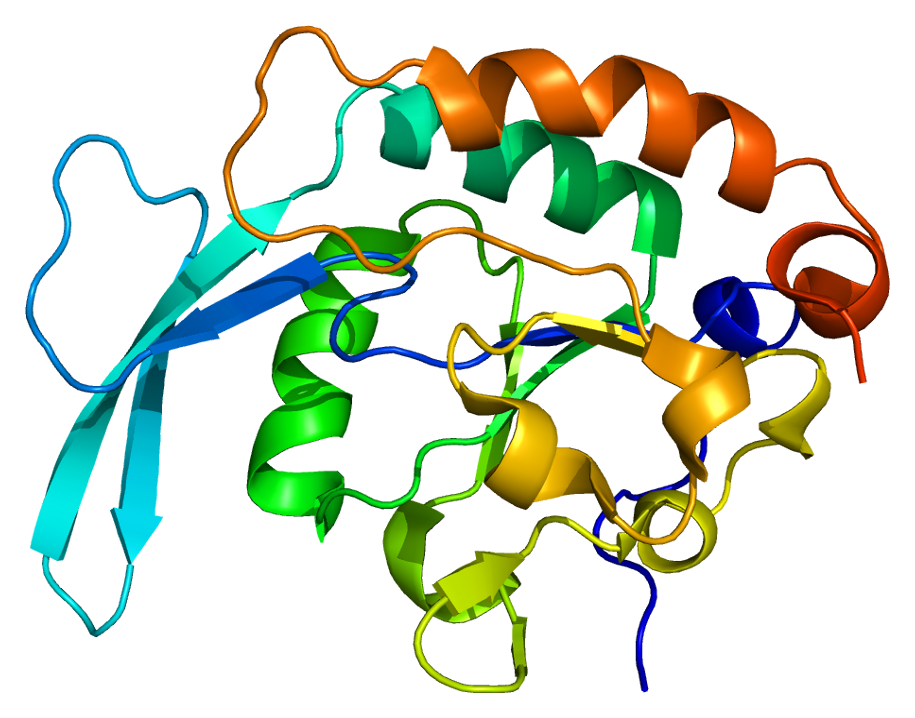

Identifiers
- Aliases: CTDSP1, NIF3, NLI-IF, NLIIF, SCP1, CTD small phosphatase 1
- External IDs: OMIM: 605323; MGI: 2654470; GeneCards: CTDSP1
Available structures
PDB	Ortholog search: PDBe RCSB
PDB	List of PDB id codes 1T9Z, 1TA0, 2GHQ, 2GHT, 3L0B, 3L0C, 3L0Y, 3PGL, 4YGY, 4YH1
Enzyme activity
EC #	BRENDA	ExPASy	KEGG	MetaCyc
3.1.3.16	↗	↗	↗	↗

Gene location (Human)
Chr.	Chromosome 2 (human)
Band	2q35	Start	218,398,256 bp
Band	2q35	End	218,405,941 bp

Gene location (Mouse)
Chr.	Chromosome 1 (mouse)
Band	1|1 C3	Start	74,430,668 bp
Band	1|1 C3	End	74,436,444 bp
RNA expression pattern
Bgee	Human / Mouse (ortholog); Top expressed in: granulocyte; right coronary artery; gastric mucosa; body of stomach; Descending thoracic aorta; apex of heart; left uterine tube; right ovary; canal of the cervix; popliteal artery / Top expressed in: granulocyte; urinary bladder; adrenal gland; white adipose tissue; muscle tissue; muscle of thigh; human kidney; lip; skeletal muscle tissue; esophagus; More reference expression data
BioGPS	n/a
Gene ontology
Molecular function	phosphatase activity; RNA polymerase II CTD heptapeptide repeat phosphatase activity; protein binding; phosphoprotein phosphatase activity; hydrolase activity; metal ion binding
Cellular component	extracellular exosome; nucleus; nucleoplasm
Biological process	regulation of transcription by RNA polymerase II; negative regulation of G1/S transition of mitotic cell cycle; negative regulation of protein phosphorylation; negative regulation of neurogenesis; protein dephosphorylation; negative regulation of neuron differentiation
Sources:Amigo / QuickGO
Orthologs
Databases	NCBI: entry; OMA: entry
Species	Human	Mouse
Entrez	58190	227292
Ensembl	ENSG00000144579	ENSMUSG00000026176
UniProt	Q9GZU7	P58466
RefSeq (mRNA)	NM_001206878; NM_001206879; NM_021198; NM_182642	NM_153088
RefSeq (protein)	NP_001193807; NP_067021; NP_872580	NP_694728
Location (UCSC)	Chr 2: 218.4 – 218.41 Mb	Chr 1: 74.43 – 74.44 Mb
PubMed search
- Wikidata
View/Edit Human	View/Edit Mouse

Carboxy-terminal domain RNA polymerase II polypeptide A small phosphatase 1 is an enzyme that in humans is encoded by the CTDSP1 gene.

== Interactions ==
CTDSP1 has been shown to interact with SNAI1.
