= L-threonine 3-dehydrogenase =

Class of enzymes

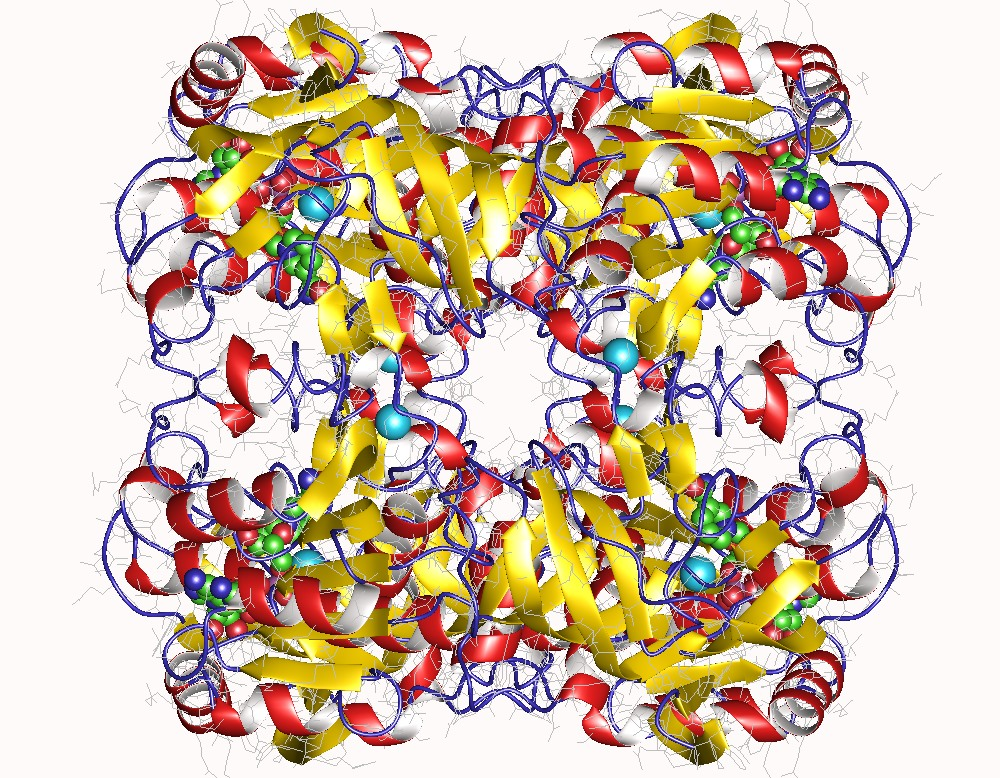
- L-threonine 3-dehydrogenase homotetramer, Thermus thermophilus

Identifiers
- EC no.: 1.1.1.103
- CAS no.: 9067-99-6

Databases
- BRENDA: enzyme data
- ExPASy: NiceZyme view
- KEGG: enzyme entry
- MetaCyc: metabolic pathway
- Rhea: reactions
- PDB structures: RCSB PDB PDBe PDBsum
- Gene Ontology: AmiGO / QuickGO
Search
- PMC: articles
- PubMed: articles
- NCBI: proteins

In enzymology, L-threonine 3-dehydrogenase (EC 1.1.1.103), or just threonine dehydrogenase, is an enzyme that participates in the process of breaking down threonine in certain non-human organisms like mice. In particular, it catalyzes the chemical reaction

L-threonine
+ NAD^{+}
H^{+}
H^{+}
(S)-2-amino-3-ketobutyric acid
+ NADH

The two substrates of this enzyme are L-threonine and oxidised nicotinamide adenine dinucleotide (NAD^{+}). Its products are (S)-2-amino-3-ketobutyric acid, reduced NADH, and a proton.

This enzyme belongs to the family of oxidoreductases, specifically those acting on the CH-OH group of donor with NAD^{+} or NADP^{+} as acceptor. The systematic name of this enzyme class is L-threonine:NAD^{+} oxidoreductase. Other names in common use include L-threonine dehydrogenase, and threonine 3-dehydrogenase.

== In humans ==
TDH

Identifiers
- Aliases: TDH, SDR14E1P, L-threonine dehydrogenase (pseudogene)
- External IDs: GeneCards: TDH

Gene location (Human)
Chr.	Chromosome 8 (human)
Band	8p23.1	Start	11,339,637 bp
Band	8p23.1	End	11,368,452 bp
Orthologs
Databases	NCBI: entry; OMA: entry
Species	Human	Mouse
Entrez	157739	n/a
Ensembl	ENSG00000154316; ENSG00000284856	n/a
UniProt	n a	n/a
RefSeq (mRNA)	NM_152566	n/a
RefSeq (protein)	n/a	n/a
Location (UCSC)	Chr 8: 11.34 – 11.37 Mb	n/a
PubMed search		n/a
- Wikidata
View/Edit Human

In humans, the homolog gene, TDH, is a non-functional pseudogene. The loss of an acceptor splice site consistently leads to a non-functional truncated protein. The primary pathway for threonine degradation in humans instead starts with threonine ammonia-lyase (aka threonine dehydratase) and produces propionyl-CoA instead of glycine.

== Structural studies ==
As of late 2007, 3 structures have been solved for this class of enzymes, with PDB accession codes PDB: 2D8A, PDB: 2DFV, and PDB: 2DQ4.
