= Small nucleolar RNA SNORD19 =

Type of RNA molecule found in eukaryotic cells

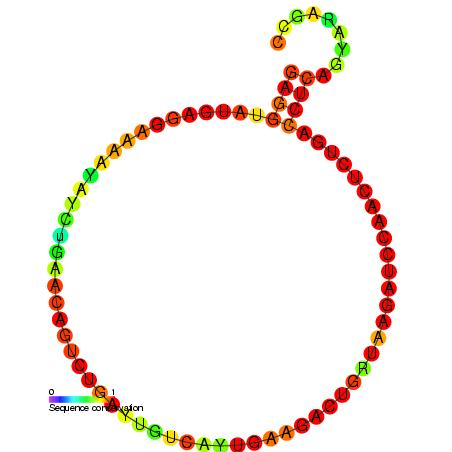
- Predicted secondary structure and sequence conservation of SNORD19

Identifiers
- Symbol: SNORD19
- Alt. Symbols: snoHBII-108
- Rfam: RF00569

Other data
- RNA type: Gene; snRNA; snoRNA; C/D-box
- Domain: Eukaryota
- GO: GO:0006396 GO:0005730
- SO: SO:0000593
- PDB structures: PDBe

In molecular biology, SNORD19 (also known as HBII-108) is a non-coding RNA (ncRNA) molecule which functions in the biogenesis (modification) of other small nuclear RNAs (snRNAs). This type of modifying RNA is located in the nucleolus of the eukaryotic cell which is a major site of snRNA biogenesis. It is known as a small nucleolar RNA (snoRNA) and also often referred to as a guide RNA.

SNORD19 belongs to the C/D box class of snoRNAs which contain the conserved sequence motifs known as the C box (UGAUGA) and the D box (CUGA). Most of the members of the box C/D family function in directing site-specific 2'-O-methylation of substrate RNAs.

HBII-108 is the human orthologue of the mouse MBII-108 and is predicted to guide 2'O-ribose methylation of the small subunit (SSU) ribosomal RNA (rRNA), 18S, on position G683. In the human genome snoRNA HBII-108 is located in the introns of the gene nucleostemin (NS), along with another snoRNA HBII-210.
