= Suppressyn =

Mammalian protein found in Homo sapiens

ERVH48-1

Identifiers
- Aliases: ERVH48-1, C21orf105, NDUFV3-AS1, endogenous retrovirus group 48 member 1, SUPYN
- External IDs: GeneCards: ERVH48-1

Gene location (Human)
Chr.	Chromosome 21 (human)
Band	21q22.3	Start	42,916,803 bp
Band	21q22.3	End	42,925,630 bp
RNA expression pattern
Bgee	Human / Mouse (ortholog); Top expressed in: placenta; sperm; gonad; decidua; bone marrow; ganglionic eminence; muscular system; muscle; muscle of thigh; body of pancreas / n/a; More reference expression data
BioGPS	n/a
Gene ontology
Molecular function	protein binding
Cellular component	plasma membrane; extracellular region; extracellular space
Biological process	syncytium formation
Sources:Amigo / QuickGO
Orthologs
Databases	NCBI: entry; OMA: entry
Species	Human	Mouse
Entrez	90625	n/a
Ensembl	ENSG00000233056	n/a
UniProt	M5A8F1	n/a
RefSeq (mRNA)	NM_001308491	n/a
RefSeq (protein)	NP_001295420	n/a
Location (UCSC)	Chr 21: 42.92 – 42.93 Mb	n/a
PubMed search		n/a
- Wikidata
View/Edit Human

Suppressyn (SUPYN) is a protein that in humans is encoded by the ERVH48-1 (endogenous retrovirus group 48 member 1) gene.

Suppressyn is expressed in embryos before implantation in the placenta, and also in the placenta. It was originally a gene for a viral coat protein that has become stably integrated within the genomes of humans and other hominids. The function of this endogenous retrovirus protein is possibly to protect against infection by mammalian type D retroviruses. This is one of hundreds of similar genes.

Suppressyn binds to the receptor for syncytin-1 in the trophoblast.

== Gene ==
The gene structure of suppressyn resembles that of the HERV gene. This structure contains the viral genes gag, pol, and env, flanked by two long-terminal repeats (LTRs). These long-terminal repeats contain all the necessary genetic elements for transcription and translation initiation and termination, this includes enhancers, promoters, and polyadenylation sites. Although this gene is present in multiple locations throughout the genome, the 21q22.3 locus encodes a full-length sequence in reverse orientation. The env genes, in particular, code for envelope glycoproteins that play a role in receptor recognition and membrane binding. Env genes frequently encode syncytin proteins, which are involved in various physiological functions of the placenta. Suppressyn, syncytin-1, and syncytin-2, proteins encoded by env genes, are all essential for placental development. Specifically, syncytin-1 and syncytin-2 facilitate trophoblast fusion, a critical process in placenta formation.

== Structure ==
Suppressyn is a 160 amino acid protein which weighs 18 kDa. It contains an O-linked glycosylation site in which glycan groups can covalently bond to amino acids containing hydroxy groups such as serine and threonine. The protein also lacks a transmembrane domain and immunosuppressive domain which is common to other genes in the family such as syctiyn-1 and synctiyn-2. Even though the suppressyn affects the immune response of the placenta, the absence of an immunosuppressive domain inhibits its ability to affect the maternal immune response.

PDB: 8OUI

== Function ==
Suppressyn, also known as the ERVH48-1/SUPYN gene, is an endogenous retrovirus expressed in human preimplantation embryos and during early and late placental development. It functions as a negative regulator of trophoblast and primary placental cell fusion, playing a crucial role in placental formation and allowing fetal-maternal interactions. The SUPYN gene remains active throughout all stages of trophoblast differentiation and has been found in many trophoblast cell types such as villous trophoblasts, extravillous trophoblast, progenitor cytotrophoblast cells, and intermediate trophoblast. SUPYN expression was also observed in locations where intermediate trophoblast cells would replace the endothelial cells of maternal blood vessels. This suggests that suppressyn is also involved in the re-structuring of blood vessels to prepare the uterus for the implantation and growth of the fetus.

Recent research has also discovered that suppressyn helps protect embryos from viral infection through its interaction with ASCT2. ASCT2 are frequently used by type D retroviruses to enter and infect cells, making it a site of frequent infection by a variety of diseases. However, suppressyn binding to ASCT2 blocks the ability of other pathogens from binding and making it impossible for viruses to enter the cell. Further supporting this hypothesis is the fact that SUPYN is often turned on when placental viruses are detected, suggesting that suppressyn proteins have antiviral activities.

=== ASCT2 glycosylation ===
Suppressyn binds to Alanine, Serine, Cysteine Transporter 2 (ASCT2), inhibiting the fusion of cells in the placenta. By competitively binding to ASCT2, suppressyn inhibits synctiyn-1 binding, a fusogenic protein from the same family which promotes the fusion of trophoblast and primary placental cells. This binding occurs in the cytoplasm, and the SUPYN interaction with ASCT2 inhibits N-type Glycosylation of ASCT2. The interplay between these two proteins, allows for the regulation of the cell fusion process to promote appropriate placental formation. Overexpression of SUPYN protein in the TS21 placenta increases its level of association with ASCT2, thus, increasing the proportion of ASCR2 with immature N-glycosylation. This has been suggested as another method by which suppressyn can regulate cell fusion rates and control placental development.

=== Germ cell layer differentiation ===
Following gastrulation, suppressyn becomes expressed in two germ layers, the endoderm and the mesoderm, and it is expressed in vitro and in vivo. When knocking out ERVH48-1 from human pluripotent stem cells (hPSCs) in vitro, there was limited disturbance of the transcriptome due to a minimal amount of notable differentially expressed genes. However, the loss of this gene reduced the expression level of marker genes for the endoderm and mesoderm lineages. In differentiated hPSCs, this lessened the upregulation of endoderm and mesoderm-specific genes. Suppressyn is crucial for proper mesoderm, cardiac progenitor, and cardiomyocyte differentiation. It is required and expressed at all stages of that conversion process. When ERVH48-1 was knocked out, beating cardiomyocytes did not develop. This can be rescued by overexpression of ERVH48-1 in those knockout cells. Without suppressyn, the differentiation process is slowed down, and hPSCs destined to be heart cells are alternatively diverted towards an ectoderm-like cell fate. The ERVH48-1 gene encodes a signal peptide that localizes the suppressyn protein to sub-cellular membrane compartments, located around the nuclear periphery. This signal peptide is essential for the interaction between and localization of ERVH48-1 and its downstream target, SFRP2. Suppressyn moderates extracellular SFRP2 levels by keeping it inside the cell. ERVH48-1 works alongside TRIM21 to polyubiquitinate SFRP2 and signal for its degradation. ERVH48-1 knockout cells had increased SFRP2 protein and the overexpression of ERVH48-1 lead to reduced SFRP2. ERVH48-1 regulates the WNT/β-catenin signaling pathway that influences the differentiation of endoderm and mesoderm germ cell layers. It does so by preventing SFRP2 interference from antagonistic binding.

=== Regulation of cell fusion ===
Suppressyn is a negative regulator that acts by directly inhibiting the fusion of cells together. In low oxygen conditions, there is an increase in ERVH48-1 transcription and suppressyn translation, indicating that the level of suppressyn is responsive to the level of oxygen. The response to those conditions is mediated by hypoxia-inducible factors binding to a 5'LTR HIF binding sequence instead of to the ERVH48-1 promoter. In examining the ERVH48-1 coding region on chromosome 21, heavily methylated CpG sites were found in tissues that don't express suppressyn, including the pancreas, liver, and kidney. DNA methylation of the 5' LTR promoter region is a regulatory mechanism allowing for suppressyn to be specifically expressed in the placenta. GATA transcription factors, that are only found in trophoblast cell lines that express suppressyn, were predicted to bind to sites within the 5' LTR and endogenous retroviral internal enhancer sequences of ERVH48-1.

== Evolution ==
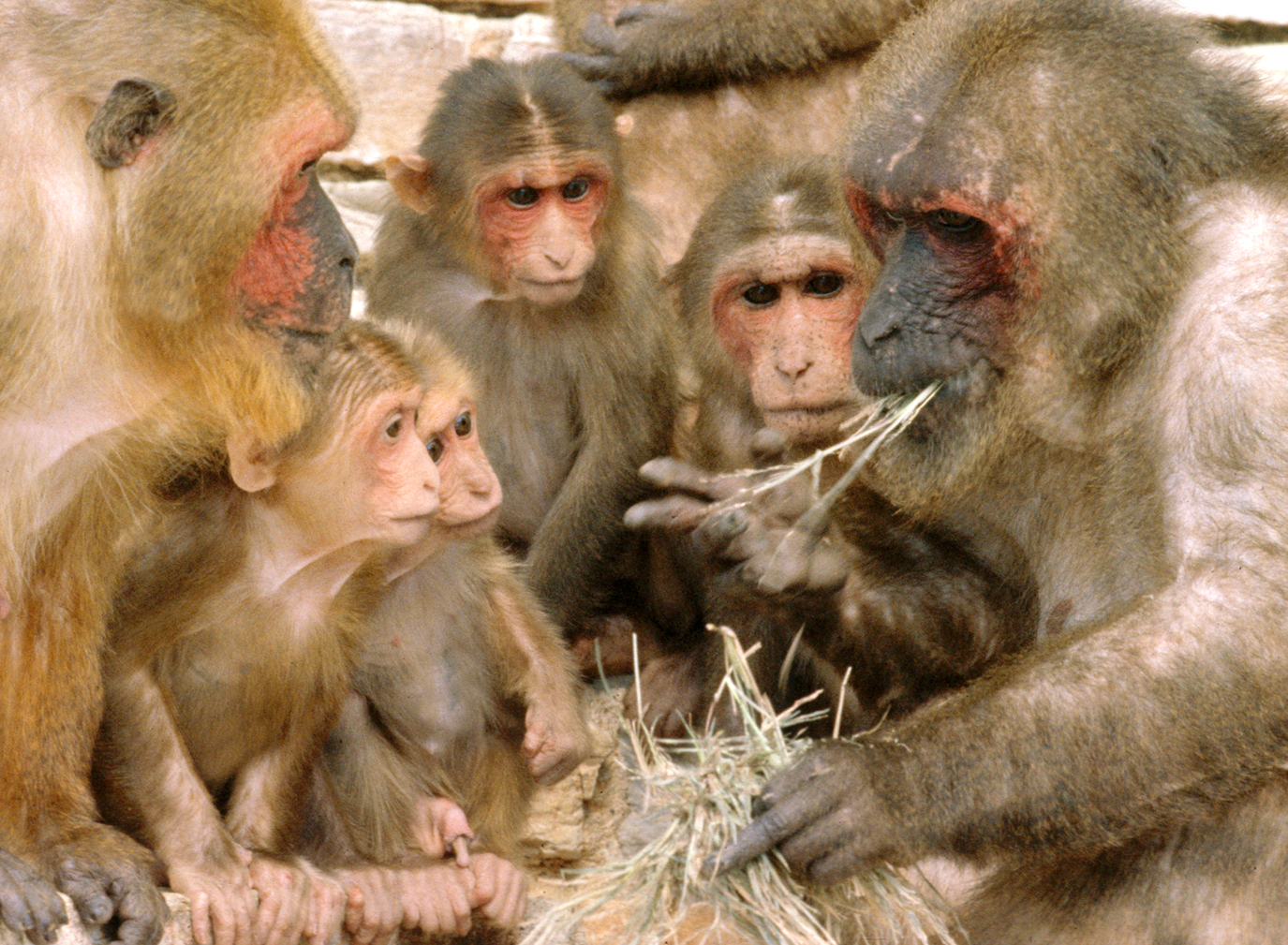
Image of the Catarrhine Primates

SUPYN originates from the HERVH48 provirus gene and is considered an endogenous retroviral gene that became part of the human genome upon retrovirus infection. As mentioned previously, SUPYN blocks the entry of other viruses by interacting with the ASCT2 receptor, and the ability to interact with this receptor in the first place is indicative of its retroviral origin. Phylogenetic analysis of the gene revealed that orthologous HERVH48 provirus genes were only found in the genomes of Hominids and Old-World Monkeys (OWM). This finding suggested that the SUPYN gene was inserted into the Catarrhine primates, 27-38 million years ago. The SUPYN gene has been conserved across all hominids for over 20 million years, indicating that it is still considered a beneficial gene to protect against retroviral infection, further supporting the hypothesis that it is an endogenous retrovirus (ERV).

== Clinical significance ==
=== Acute myeloid leukemia ===
Supressyn has significant implications for diagnosis and prognosis of acute myeloid leukemia, a blood cancer where myeloid blasts cannot differentiate properly, resulting in disease progression. Human endogenous retroviruses play a crucial role in the pathogenesis of AML. Particularly, Supressyn and synctin-2 have been identified as promising biomarkers for AML prognosis. Supressyn and synctin-2 expression levels are higher in AML patients than in healthy individuals. AML patients with higher supressyn expression are associated with better overall survival, lower cytogenic risks, and the absence of NPM1 mutations, suggesting a better prognosis. Furthermore, supressyn levels vary between age groups indicating a connection between supressyn expression and symptoms of AML. Low risk AML patients show higher expression levels and longer survival times. Supressyn is also involved in immune related pathways. Specifically, it is positively correlated with T-helper cells, central memory T cells, and immunoinhibitors that suppress immune responses. It is also negatively correlated with macrophages, immature dendritic cells and immunostimulators. Similarly, HERV-K env proteins have been shown to enhance B-cell responses in lung cancer, suggesting a role in immune activation.

=== Trisomy 21 ===
SUPYN expression is restricted to the placenta, where it negatively regulates syncytia formation within the villi. In placentas with Trisomy 21 (TS21), increased chromosomal copy number has been associated with elevated SUPYN transcription, translation, and secretion, suggesting a potential link between Down syndrome and heightened SUPYN expression. This association is further supported by clinical findings showing that women carrying TS21 pregnancies have significantly higher concentrations of secreted SUPYN in maternal serum. Moreover, TS21 placentas exhibit increased expression of ERVH48-1 transcripts and SUPYN protein compared to gestational age-matched disomic controls (16–20 weeks), reinforcing a connection between chromosomal abnormalities and altered placental signaling pathways.

SUPYN appears to play a regulatory role in trophoblast fusion in TS21 placental cells. Treatment with SUPYN-specific siRNA (small interfering RNA) results in a significant increase in CGB (Chorionic gonadotropin beta) transcript levels, suggesting that SUPYN may suppress genes involved in trophoblast differentiation. SUPYN also exhibits anti-fusogenic activity in primary TS21 placental cells, inhibiting their capacity to fuse. Following SUPYN knockdown, both ERVH48-1 transcript levels and SUPYN protein products are markedly reduced compared to untransfected and control-treated samples, confirming the specificity and effectiveness of the siRNA. However, knockdown experiments in human primary trophoblasts are often limited by low knockdown efficiency, which can result in robust baseline fusion and hinder detection of further increases in the fusion index.
