= Musashi-2 =

Protein-coding gene in the species Homo sapiens

MSI2
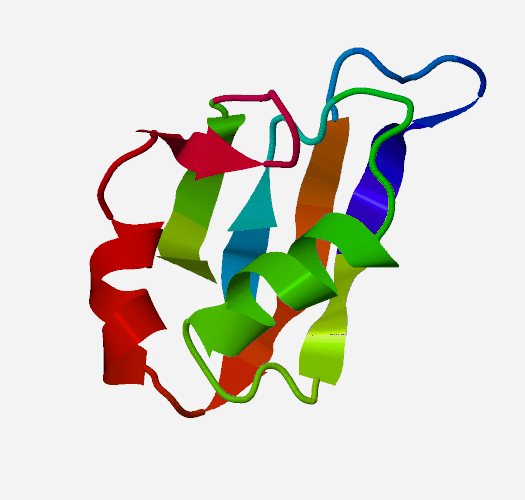

Identifiers
- Aliases: MSI2, MSI2H, musashi RNA binding protein 2, Musashi2, Musashi-2
- External IDs: OMIM: 607897; MGI: 1923876; GeneCards: MSI2

Gene location (Human)
Chr.	Chromosome 17 (human)
Band	17q22	Start	57,255,851 bp
Band	17q22	End	57,684,689 bp

Gene location (Mouse)
Chr.	Chromosome 11 (mouse)
Band	11|11 C	Start	88,230,208 bp
Band	11|11 C	End	88,609,339 bp
RNA expression pattern
Bgee	Human / Mouse (ortholog); Top expressed in: corpus epididymis; internal globus pallidus; pars reticulata; caput epididymis; renal medulla; bronchial epithelial cell; pars compacta; mucosa of paranasal sinus; corpus callosum; buccal mucosa cell / Top expressed in: Rostral migratory stream; ciliary body; retinal pigment epithelium; habenula; pineal gland; interventricular septum; olfactory epithelium; aortic valve; ankle; transitional epithelium of urinary bladder; More reference expression data
BioGPS	n/a
Gene ontology
Molecular function	protein binding; single-stranded RNA binding; nucleic acid binding; poly(U) RNA binding; RNA binding
Cellular component	cytoplasm; polysome; ribonucleoprotein complex
Biological process	stem cell development
Sources:Amigo / QuickGO
Orthologs
Databases	NCBI: entry; OMA: entry
Species	Human	Mouse
Entrez	124540	76626
Ensembl	ENSG00000153944	ENSMUSG00000069769
UniProt	Q96DH6	Q920Q6
RefSeq (mRNA)	NM_138962; NM_170721; NM_001322250; NM_001322251	NM_001201341; NM_054043; NM_001363194; NM_001363195; NM_001373923
RefSeq (protein)	NP_001309179; NP_001309180; NP_620412; NP_733839	NP_001188270; NP_473384; NP_001350123; NP_001350124; NP_001360852
Location (UCSC)	Chr 17: 57.26 – 57.68 Mb	Chr 11: 88.23 – 88.61 Mb
PubMed search
- Wikidata
View/Edit Human	View/Edit Mouse

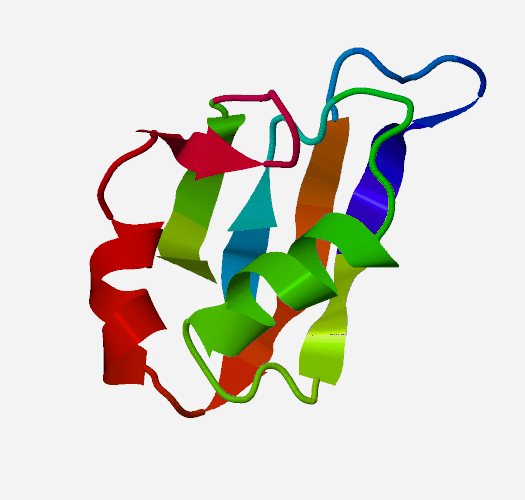
Musashi-2 protein in homolog 2 in Homo sapiens.

Musashi-2, also known as Musashi RNA binding protein 2, is a protein that in humans is encoded by the MSI2 gene. Like its homologue musashi-1 (MSI1), it is an RNA-binding protein involved in stemness.

== Expression ==
There are two homologue genes found in mammals, called musashi1 (MSI1) and musashi-2 (MSI2). Musashi-2 is an RNA-binding protein expressed in neuronal progenitor cells, including stem cells, and both normal and leukemic blood cells.

Musashi-2 also appears to be expressed in stem cells and in a wide variety of tissues, including the bulge region of the hair follicle, immature pancreatic β-cells and neural progenitor cells. Amongst the last ones, MSI2 is expressed in early stages of development, in the ventricular and subventricular zone, in cells of the astrocyte lineage. It was there that it was first discovered. Within the hematopoietic system, MSI2 is highly expressed in the most primitive progenitors, in stem cell compartments, and its overexpression has been found in myeloid leukemia cell lines. In neural cell lines, MSI2 protein, as well as its homologue MSI1, is exclusively located in the cytoplasm.

In humans, the MSI2 gene is located in chromosome 17q23.2. and has a sequence length of 1,414bp of which 987bp are encoded. In mice, MSI2 has been found to be in 11qB5-C and BC169841 in the African clawed frog (Xenopus laevis). There are two different isoforms of MSI2 expressed by embryonic stem cells that result from alternative splicing, isoform 1 and isoform 2. The first one is the larger canonical isoform, and the second one is the shorter, splice-variant Isoform.

== Function ==
This gene encodes an RNA-binding protein that is a member of the Musashi protein family. The encoded protein is translational regulator that targets genes involved in development and cell cycle regulation. Mutations in this gene are associated with poor prognosis in certain types of cancers. This gene has also been shown to be rearranged in certain cancer cells. The first musashi (abbreviation MSI) gene was first discovered in Drosophila and then later identified in other eukaryotic species.

MSI2 is involved in organismal development. As with the rest of Musashi family RNA-binding proteins, MSI2 is linked to tissue stem cells and has an influence in asymmetric cell division, germ and somatic stem cell function and cell fate determination in a variety of tissues.

As an RNA-binding protein, MSI2 is acts as a translational inhibitor. Through this molecular mechanism, MSI2 contributes in more than one vital aspect, as in the development of the nervous system, regulation of the Hematopoietic stem cell (HSC) compartment, or the self-renewal and pluripotency of embryonic stem cells. MSI2 takes part in a high number of pathways related to the self-renewal of some stem cells. However, it is not only focused in one specific type. Depending on the tissue where it is located, it develops different functions.

=== Embryonic stem cells ===
MSI2 belongs to the RNA-processing group of proteins which are associated with the transcription factor SOX2 during the early stages of differentiation. SOX2 is known to be essential during embryogenesis and in the self-renewal and pluripotency of embryonic stem cells. MSI2 has a high influence on it too, since the gain or loss of self-renewal capacity and the extent of differentiation depends on MSI2 levels. Although both of the isoforms of this protein are needed to the maintenance of the self-renewal, they are different on a functional way and they play different roles in some aspects of the process. For example, only isoform 1 expression is related to the cloning efficiency of embryonic stem cells.

=== Neural progenitor stem cells ===
In a similar way to MSI1, MSI2 is also active in the proliferation of pluripotent neural precursors cells of the embryo, during which both MSI1 and MSI2 are strongly co-expressed. Moreover, MSI1 and MSI2 regulate the multiplication and maintenance of a specific group inside of neural precursors cells: CNS (central neural system) stem cells populations. Therefore, MSI2 plays a significant role in the development and maintenance of CNS stem cells through post-transcriptional gene regulation.

=== Hematopoiesis ===
MSI2 is present in blood cells, in which its expression is situated in the hematopoietic system, more commonly in the most primitive cells. These are the LSK cells, which are composed by long-term hematopoietic stem cells (LT-HSCs), short-term HSCs (ST-HCSs) and multipotent progenitors (MPPs).

Self-renewal and differentiation processes in hematopoietic stem cells need to be highly regulated in order to maintain homeostasis and to avoid the growing of blood cell malignancies. It is this point is where Musashi-2 interferes. Therefore, MSI2's function in HSCs consists of regulating their proliferation and differentiation. Therefore, a decreasing on the level of MSI2 induces a reduction in the number of more primitive progenitors of HSCs.

== Clinical significance ==
As Musashi-2 is involved in the generation of hematopoietic cells, it is also linked with cancer pathologies:

=== Myeloid leukemia ===
It has been found that MSI2 plays an important role in myeloid leukemia. In both of chronic myelogenous leukemia (CML) and acute myeloid leukemia (AML), MSI2 regulates hematopoietic stem cell proliferation and does not allow the differentiation of its gene expression.

=== Chronic myelogenous leukemia ===
Chronic myelogenous leukemia (CML) progresses from the initial phase, where differentiated myeloid cells are accumulated, to the accelerated phase, where the expansion of these cells increases, and it ends with the blast crisis phase. It has been found that MSI2 participates together with BCR-ABL gene to stimulate the progress to the aggressive phase. The first evidence to consider its role in this phase is its high concentration compared with the first phase of the disease. One of the functions of the MSI2 is to regulate the expression of NUMB, causing its inhibition. Therefore, the function of the MSI2 in this disease is being studied together with Numb expression. However, while Numb is overexpressed during the chronic phase and decreases in the blast one, Musashi starts to be overexpressed in the last fatal phase of CML. The high expression of MSI2 interrupts the cellular differentiation and allows the expansion of immature leukemic cells causing the progress to the deadly phase.

=== Acute myeloid leukemia ===
As acute myeloid leukemia (AML) has a similar behavior to the aggressive phase of the CML, MSI2's role is similar there as well. It has been found that MSI2 is overexpressed in this type of leukemia and its activity is related with Numb consequently. Moreover, the high expression of MSI2 is related with a poor clinical outcome. In order to prove this, it has been demonstrated that with MSI's knockdown leads to a rising apoptosis and differentiation and to a decreasing proliferation. As a result, patients that develop leukemia without a high expression of MSI2 have a better prognostic.

== Diagnostic and therapeutic applications ==
MIS2 is a potential cancer biomarker as well as a drug target.

== See also ==
- Musashi-1
