= Musashi-1 =

Protein-coding gene in the species Homo sapiens

MSI1
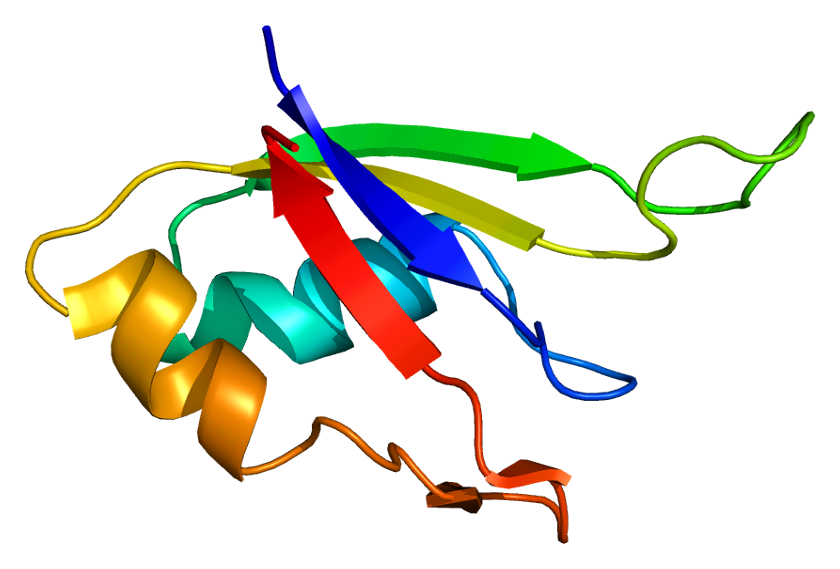

Identifiers
- Aliases: MSI1, musashi RNA binding protein 1
- External IDs: OMIM: 603328; MGI: 107376; GeneCards: MSI1
Available structures
PDB	Ortholog search: PDBe RCSB
PDB	List of PDB id codes 1UAW, 2MSS, 2MST, 2RS2

Gene location (Human)
Chr.	Chromosome 12 (human)
Band	12q24.31	Start	120,341,330 bp
Band	12q24.31	End	120,369,164 bp

Gene location (Mouse)
Chr.	Chromosome 5 (mouse)
Band	5|5 F	Start	115,567,658 bp
Band	5|5 F	End	115,593,757 bp
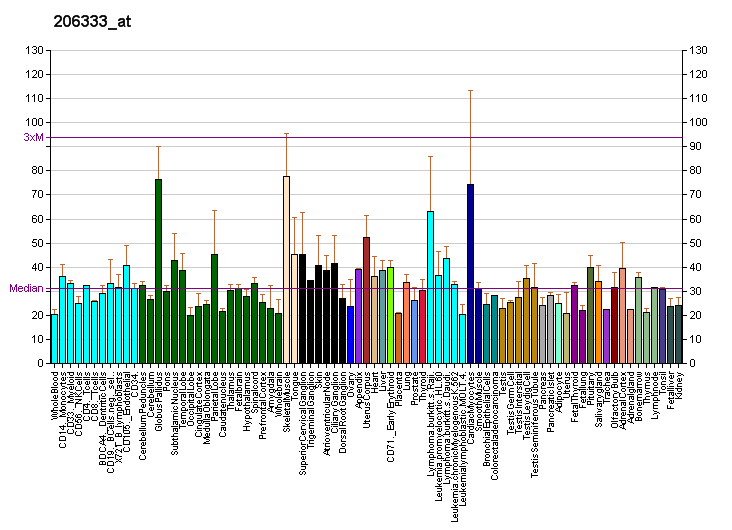
RNA expression pattern
Bgee	Human / Mouse (ortholog); Top expressed in: ventricular zone; ganglionic eminence; frontal pole; left testis; right testis; anterior pituitary; islet of Langerhans; amygdala; cingulate gyrus; anterior cingulate cortex / Top expressed in: neural layer of retina; ventricular zone; molar; epithelium of lens; Rostral migratory stream; ganglionic eminence; tail of embryo; habenula; epiblast; somite; More reference expression data
BioGPS	More reference expression data
Gene ontology
Molecular function	single-stranded RNA binding; nucleic acid binding; poly(U) RNA binding; identical protein binding; RNA binding
Cellular component	cytoplasm; polysome; nucleus; ribonucleoprotein complex
Biological process	nervous system development
Sources:Amigo / QuickGO
Orthologs
Databases	NCBI: entry; OMA: entry
Species	Human	Mouse
Entrez	4440	17690
Ensembl	ENSG00000135097	ENSMUSG00000054256
UniProt	O43347	Q61474
RefSeq (mRNA)	NM_002442	NM_008629; NM_001376960; NM_001376961; NM_001376962; NM_001376963
RefSeq (protein)	NP_002433	NP_032655; NP_001363889; NP_001363890; NP_001363891; NP_001363892
Location (UCSC)	Chr 12: 120.34 – 120.37 Mb	Chr 5: 115.57 – 115.59 Mb
PubMed search
- Wikidata
View/Edit Human	View/Edit Mouse

RNA-binding protein Musashi homolog 1 also known as Musashi-1 is a protein that in humans is encoded by the MSI1 gene.

== Function ==
This gene encodes a protein containing two conserved tandem RNA recognition motifs and functions as an RNA binding protein that is involved in post-transcriptional gene editing. It is a stem cell marker that controls the balance between self-renewal and terminal differentiation.

== Clinical significance ==
Over expression of this gene is associated with the grade of the malignancy and proliferative activity in gliomas and melanomas. An increased expression of MSI1 protein is observed in endometriosis and endometrial carcinoma siRNA-mediated inhibition of MSI expression in endometrial carcinoma cells induces apoptosis and inhibits cell proliferation by affecting the Notch signaling pathway

MSI1 is highly expressed in neural progenitor cells and is required for normal development of the brain. A mutation in these gene is responsible for autosomal recessive primary microcephaly. MSI1 also interacts with the Zika virus genome and may explain why these cells are highly susceptible to Zika virus infection.

== Name ==
The musashi (msi) mutant of Drosophila melanogaster, in which a homolog of the human MSI1 gene was discovered first, is characterized by formation of macrochaetes with double shafts. For this reason, the mutant and the corresponding gene and protein were named after Miyamoto Musashi who developed a double-bladed style of swordsmanship.

== See also ==
- Musashi-2
