= Choline acetyltransferase =

Protein-coding gene in the species Homo sapiens

Identifiers
- EC no.: 2.3.1.6
- CAS no.: 9012-78-6

Databases
- BRENDA: enzyme data
- ExPASy: NiceZyme view
- KEGG: enzyme entry
- MetaCyc: metabolic pathway
- Rhea: reactions
- PDB structures: RCSB PDB PDBe PDBsum
- Gene Ontology: AmiGO / QuickGO
Search
- PMC: articles
- PubMed: articles
- NCBI: proteins

CHAT
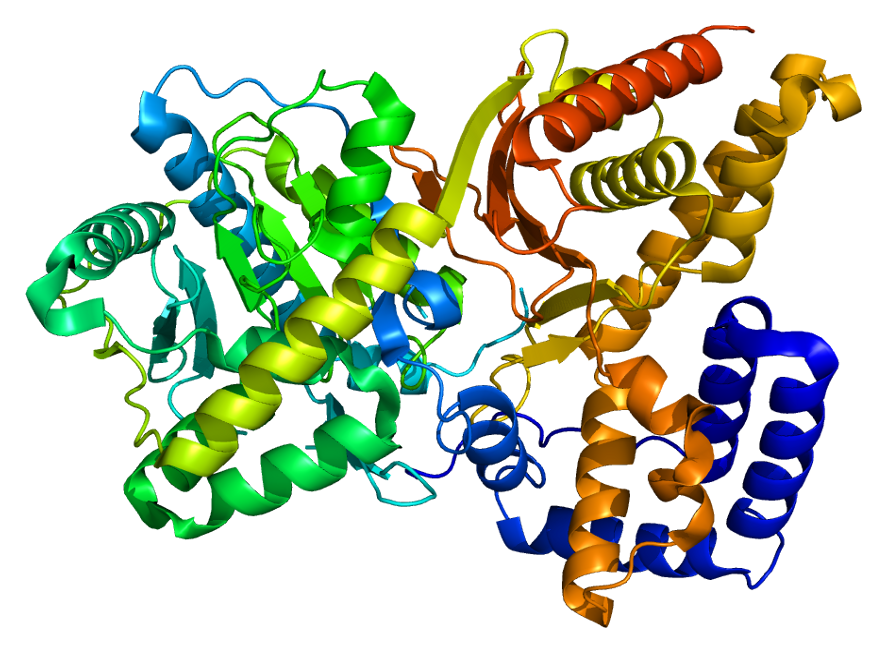

Identifiers
- Aliases: CHAT, CHOACTASE, CMS1A, CMS1A2, CMS6, choline O-acetyltransferase
- External IDs: OMIM: 118490; MGI: 88392; GeneCards: CHAT
Available structures
PDB	Ortholog search: PDBe RCSB
PDB	List of PDB id codes 2FY2, 2FY3, 2FY4, 2FY5
Enzyme activity
EC #	BRENDA	ExPASy	KEGG	MetaCyc
2.3.1.6	↗	↗	↗	↗

Gene location (Human)
Chr.	Chromosome 10 (human)
Band	10q11.23	Start	49,609,095 bp
Band	10q11.23	End	49,667,942 bp

Gene location (Mouse)
Chr.	Chromosome 14 (mouse)
Band	14 B|14 19.4 cM	Start	32,130,160 bp
Band	14 B|14 19.4 cM	End	32,187,946 bp
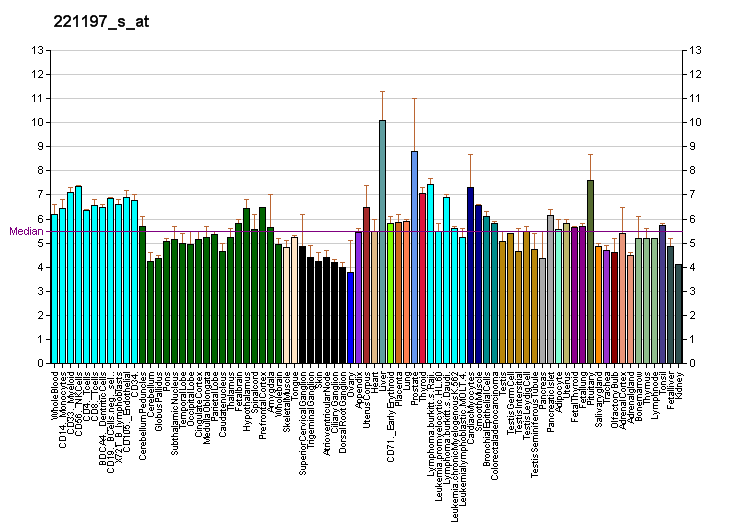
RNA expression pattern
Bgee	Human / Mouse (ortholog); Top expressed in: gonad; testicle; putamen; mucosa of transverse colon; caudate nucleus; nucleus accumbens; placenta; small intestine; duodenum; appendix / Top expressed in: facial motor nucleus; lumbar subsegment of spinal cord; habenula; nucleus ambiguus; anterior horn of spinal cord; striatum of neuraxis; central gray substance of midbrain; superior frontal gyrus; neural layer of retina; globus pallidus; More reference expression data
BioGPS	More reference expression data
Gene ontology
Molecular function	transferase activity; acyltransferase activity; choline O-acetyltransferase activity
Cellular component	cytoplasm; cytosol; nucleus; presynapse; neuron projection
Biological process	neurotransmitter biosynthetic process; phosphatidylcholine biosynthetic process; neurotransmitter secretion; neuromuscular synaptic transmission; acetylcholine biosynthetic process
Sources:Amigo / QuickGO
Orthologs
Databases	NCBI: entry; OMA: entry
Species	Human	Mouse
Entrez	1103	12647
Ensembl	ENSG00000070748	ENSMUSG00000021919
UniProt	P28329	Q8BQV2
RefSeq (mRNA)	NM_020986; NM_001142929; NM_001142933; NM_001142934; NM_020549 NM_020984; NM_020985	NM_009891
RefSeq (protein)	NP_001136401; NP_001136405; NP_001136406; NP_065574; NP_066264 NP_066265; NP_066266	NP_034021
Location (UCSC)	Chr 10: 49.61 – 49.67 Mb	Chr 14: 32.13 – 32.19 Mb
PubMed search
- Wikidata
View/Edit Human	View/Edit Mouse

Choline acetyltransferase (commonly abbreviated as ChAT, but sometimes CAT) is a transferase enzyme responsible for the synthesis of the neurotransmitter acetylcholine. ChAT catalyzes the transfer of an acetyl group from the coenzyme acetyl-CoA to choline, yielding acetylcholine (ACh). ChAT is found in high concentration in cholinergic neurons, both in the central nervous system (CNS) and peripheral nervous system (PNS). As with most nerve terminal proteins, ChAT is produced in the body of the neuron and is transported to the nerve terminal, where its concentration is highest. Presence of ChAT in a nerve cell classifies this cell as a "cholinergic" neuron. In humans, the choline acetyltransferase enzyme is encoded by the CHAT gene.

== History ==
Choline acetyltransferase was first described by David Nachmansohn and A. L. Machado in 1943. A German biochemist, Nachmansohn had been studying the process of nerve impulse conduction and utilization of energy-yielding chemical reactions in cells, expanding upon the works of Nobel laureates Otto Warburg and Otto Meyerhof on fermentation, glycolysis, and muscle contraction. Based on prior research showing that "acetylcholine's actions on structural proteins" were responsible for nerve impulses, Nachmansohn and Machado investigated the origin of acetylcholine.

An enzyme has been extracted from brain and nervous tissue which forms acetylcholine. The formation occurs only in presence of adenosinetriphosphate (ATP). The enzyme is called choline acetylase.

— Nachmanson & Machado, 1943

The acetyl transferase mode of action was unknown at the time of this discovery, however Nachmansohn hypothesized the possibility of acetylphosphate or phosphorylcholine exchanging the phosphate (from ATP) for choline or acetate ion. It was not until 1945 that Coenzyme A (CoA) was discovered simultaneously and independently by three laboratories, Nachmansohn's being one of these. Subsequently, acetyl-CoA, at the time called “active acetate,” was discovered in 1951. The 3D structure of rat-derived ChAT was not solved until nearly 60 years later, in 2004.

== Structure ==
The 3D structure of ChAT has been solved by X-ray crystallography PDB: 2FY2. Choline is bound in the active site of ChAT by non-covalent interactions between the positively charged amine of choline and the hydroxyl group of Tyr552, in addition to a hydrogen bond between choline's hydroxyl group and a histidine residue, His324.

The choline substrate fits into a pocket in the interior of ChAT, while acetyl-CoA fits into a pocket on the surface of the protein. The 3D crystal structure shows the acetyl group of acetyl-CoA abuts the choline binding pocket – minimizing the distance between acetyl-group donor and receiver.

Structure of choline acetyltransferase binding sites
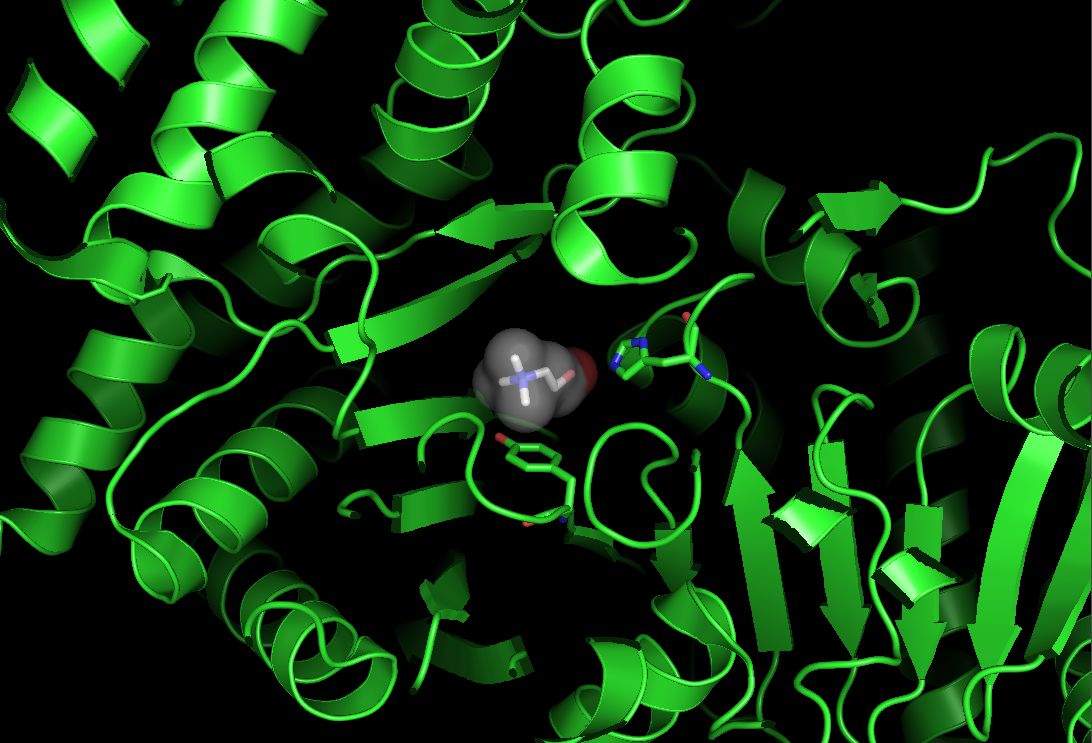
Crystal structure of choline ion bound in choline acetyltransferase. Side chain residues of His324A and Tyr552A shown.PDB: 2FY3

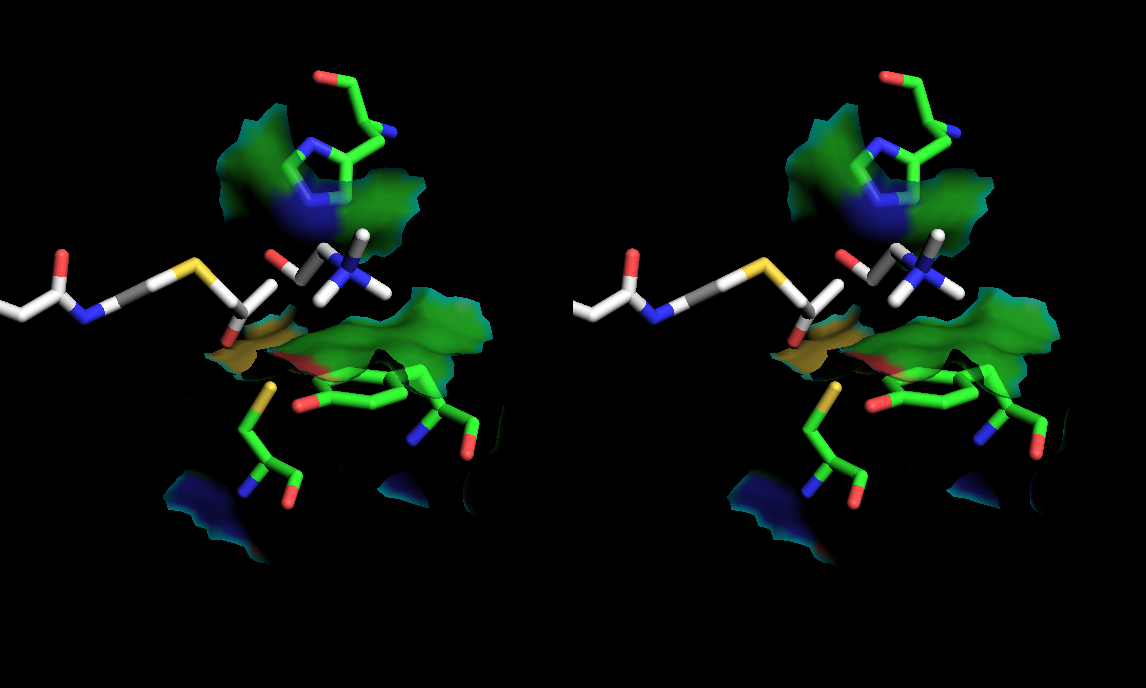
Stereoscopic depiction of choline and acetyl-CoA in ChAT active site.(PDB: 2FY3, PDB: 2FY5 - overlaid).

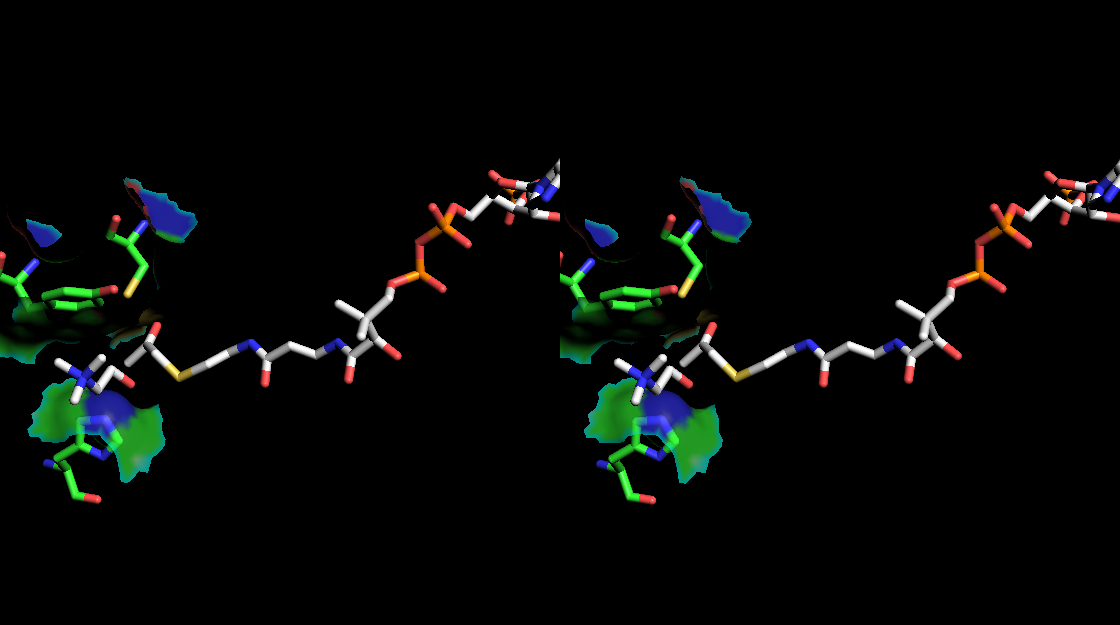
Stereoscopic depiction of choline and acetyl-CoA bound in ChAT active site - alternate angle. (PDB: 2FY3, PDB: 2FY5 - overlaid).

=== Homology ===
ChAT is very conserved across the animal genome. Among mammals, in particular, there is very high sequence similarity. Human and cat (Felis catus) ChAT, for example, have 89% sequence identity. Sequence identity with Drosophila is about 30%.

== Forms of ChAT ==
There are two forms of ChAT: Soluble form and membrane-bound form. The soluble form accounts for 80-90% of the total enzyme activity while the membrane-bound form is responsible for the rest of 10-20% activity. However, there has long been a debate on how the latter form of ChAT is bound to the membrane. The membrane-bound form of ChAT is associated with synaptic vesicles.

=== Common and peripheral isoforms of ChAT ===
There exist two isoforms of ChAT, both encoded by the same sequence. The common type ChAT (cChAT) is present in both the CNS and PNS. Peripheral type ChAT (pChAT) is preferentially expressed in the PNS in humans, and arises from exon skipping (exons 6–9) during post-transcriptional modification. Therefore, the amino acid sequence is very similar; however, pChAT is missing parts of the sequence present in cChAT. The pChAT isoform was discovered in 2000 based on observations that brain-derived ChAT antibodies failed to stain peripheral cholinergic neurons as they do for those found in the brain. This gene splicing mechanism which leads to cChAT and pChAT differences has been observed in various species, including both vertebrate mammals and invertebrate mollusks, suggesting this mechanism leads to some yet-unidentified evolutionary advantage.

== Function ==
Choline acetyltransferase catalyses a reaction which adds an acetyl group from coenzyme A to choline, to produce the neurotransmitter:

choline
+
acetyl-CoA
acetylcholine
+ coenzyme A

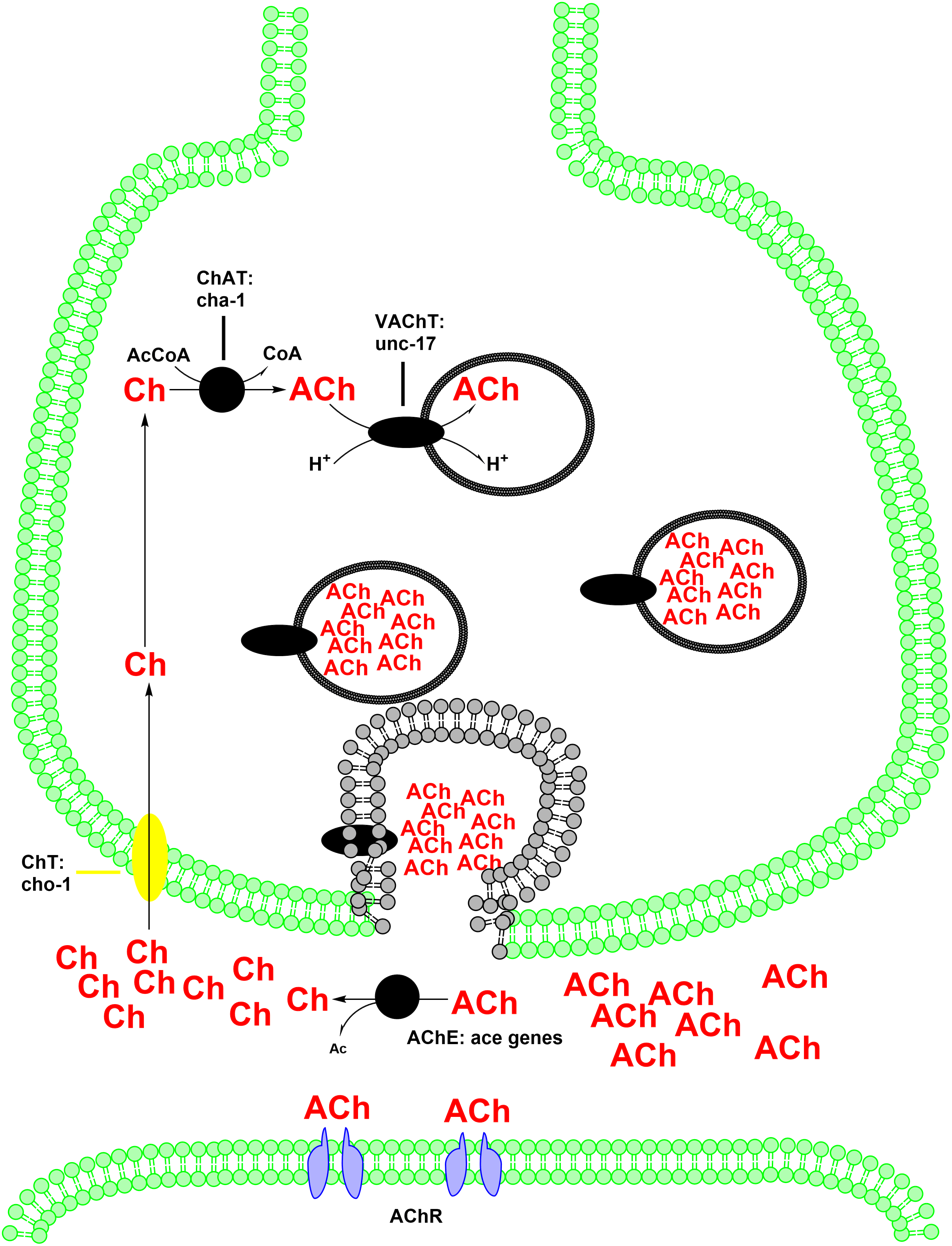
synthesis and transportation of ACh in cells

Cholinergic systems are implicated in numerous neurologic functions. Alteration in some cholinergic neurons may account for the disturbances of Alzheimer's disease. The protein encoded by this gene synthesizes the neurotransmitter, acetylcholine. Acetylcholine acts at two classes of receptors in the central nervous system – muscarinic and nicotinic – which are each implicated in different physiological responses. The role of acetylcholine at the nicotinic receptor is still under investigation. It is likely implicated in the reward/reinforcement pathways, as indicated by the addictive nature of nicotine, which also binds to the nicotinic receptor. The muscarinic action of acetylcholine in the CNS is implicated in learning and memory. The loss of cholinergic innervation in the neocortex has been associated with memory loss, as is evidenced in advanced cases of Alzheimer's disease. In the peripheral nervous system, cholinergic neurons are implicated in the control of visceral functions such as, but not limited to, cardiac muscle contraction and gastrointestinal tract function.

The enzyme is often used as an immunohistochemical marker for motor neurons (motoneurons).

== Mutations ==
Mutants of ChAT have been isolated in several species, including C. elegans, Drosophila, and humans. Most non-lethal mutants that have a non-wild type phenotype exhibit some activity, but significantly less than wild type.

In C. elegans, several mutations in ChAT have been traced to the cha-1 gene. All mutations result in a significant drop in ChAT activity. Percent activity loss can be greater than 98% in some cases. Phenotypic effects include slowed growth, decreased size, uncoordinated behavior, and lack of sensitivity toward cholinesterase inhibitors. Isolated temperature-sensitive mutants in Drosophila have all been lethal. Prior to death, affected flies show a change in behavior, including uncontrolled movements and a change in electroretinogram activity.

The human gene responsible for encoding ChAT is CHAT. Mutations in CHAT have been linked to congenital myasthenic syndrome, a disease which leads to general motor function deficiency and weakness. Further symptoms include fatal apnea. Out of ten isolated mutants, 1 has been shown to lack activity completely, 8 have been shown to have significantly decreased activity, and 1 has an unknown function.

== Clinical significance ==
=== Alzheimer's disease ===
The Alzheimer's disease (AD) involves difficulty in memory and cognition. The concentrations of acetylcholine and ChAT are remarkably reduced in the cerebral neocortex and hippocampus. Although the cellular loss and dysfunction of the cholinergic neurones is considered a contributor to Alzheimer disease, it is generally not considered as a primary factor in the development of this disease. It is proposed that the aggregation and deposition of the Beta amyloid protein, interferes with the metabolism of neurones and further damages the cholinergic axons in the cortex and cholinergic neurones in the basal forebrain.

=== Amyotrophic lateral sclerosis ===
The amyotrophic lateral sclerosis (ALS) is one of the most common motor neuron diseases. A significant loss of ChAT immunoreactivity is found in ALS. It is hypothesized that the cholinergic function is involved in an uncontrolled increase of intracellular calcium concentration whose reason still remains unclear.

=== Drugs ===
Neostigmine methylsulfate, an anticholinesterase agent, has been used to target ChAT. In particular, use of neostigmine methylsulfate has been shown to have positive effects against congenital myasthenic syndrome.

Exposure to estradiol has been shown to increase ChAT in female rats.

== See also ==
- Acetyltransferase
