= ELAV-like protein 4 =

Protein found in humans

ELAVL4

Identifiers
- Aliases: ELAVL4, HUD, PNEM, HuD, ELAV like neuron-specific RNA binding protein 4, ELAV like RNA binding protein 4
- External IDs: OMIM: 168360; MGI: 107427; GeneCards: ELAVL4
Available structures
PDB	Ortholog search: PDBe RCSB
PDB	List of PDB id codes 1FXL, 1G2E

Gene location (Human)
Chr.	Chromosome 1 (human)
Band	1p33-p32.3	Start	50,024,029 bp
Band	1p33-p32.3	End	50,203,772 bp

Gene location (Mouse)
Chr.	Chromosome 4 (mouse)
Band	4 C7|4 51.42 cM	Start	110,203,722 bp
Band	4 C7|4 51.42 cM	End	110,351,909 bp
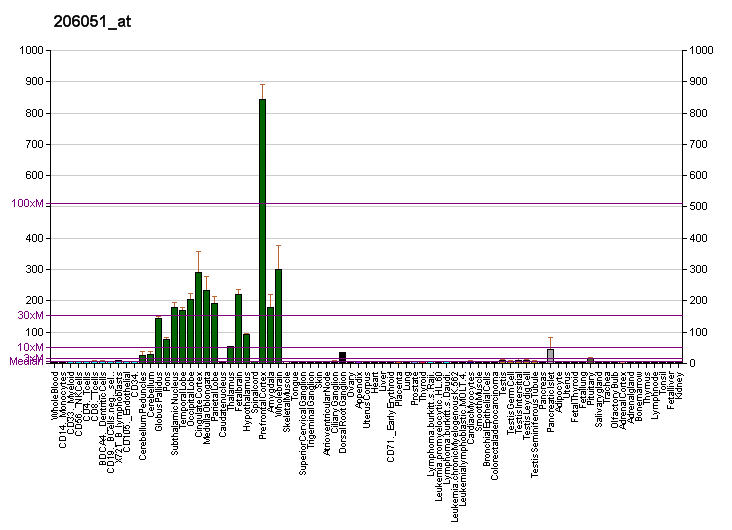
RNA expression pattern
Bgee	Human / Mouse (ortholog); Top expressed in: endothelial cell; ganglionic eminence; Brodmann area 23; middle temporal gyrus; pons; Brodmann area 46; parietal lobe; postcentral gyrus; superior frontal gyrus; sperm / Top expressed in: habenula; ventral tegmental area; medial vestibular nucleus; superior cervical ganglion; trigeminal ganglion; ganglionic eminence; neural tube; pontine nuclei; medial ganglionic eminence; Rostral migratory stream; More reference expression data
BioGPS	More reference expression data
Orthologs
Databases	NCBI: entry; OMA: entry
Species	Human	Mouse
Entrez	1996	15572
Ensembl	ENSG00000162374	ENSMUSG00000028546
UniProt	P26378	Q61701
RefSeq (mRNA)	NM_001144774; NM_001144775; NM_001144776; NM_001144777; NM_001294348 NM_021952; NM_001324208; NM_001324209; NM_001324212; NM_001324213; NM_001324214; NM_001324215; NM_001324216; NM_001324217	NM_001038698; NM_001163397; NM_001163399; NM_010488; NM_001347178 NM_001357190
RefSeq (protein)	NP_001138246; NP_001138247; NP_001138248; NP_001138249; NP_001281277 NP_001311137; NP_001311138; NP_001311141; NP_001311142; NP_001311143; NP_001311144; NP_001311145; NP_001311146; NP_068771	NP_001033787; NP_001156869; NP_001156871; NP_001334107; NP_034618 NP_001344119
Location (UCSC)	Chr 1: 50.02 – 50.2 Mb	Chr 4: 110.2 – 110.35 Mb
PubMed search
- Wikidata
View/Edit Human	View/Edit Mouse

HuD otherwise known as ELAV-like protein 4 is a protein that in humans is encoded by the ELAVL4 gene.

The HuD/ELAVL4 protein is an RNA-binding protein. HuD contains three RRM protein domains, enabling RNA binding.

HuD is expressed only in neurons and it binds to AU-rich element-containing mRNAs. As a result of this interaction the half-life of the transcript is increased. HuD is important in neurons during brain development and plasticity.

== Interactions ==
HuD (protein) has been shown to interact with NXF1.
