= Germ cell nuclear factor =

Protein-coding gene in the species Homo sapiens

NR6A1

Identifiers
- Aliases: NR6A1, CT150, GCNF, GCNF1, NR61, RTR, hGCNF, hRTR, nuclear receptor subfamily 6 group A member 1
- External IDs: OMIM: 602778; MGI: 1352459; GeneCards: NR6A1

Gene location (Human)
Chr.	Chromosome 9 (human)
Band	9q33.3	Start	124,517,275 bp
Band	9q33.3	End	124,771,311 bp

Gene location (Mouse)
Chr.	Chromosome 2 (mouse)
Band	2|2 B	Start	38,613,382 bp
Band	2|2 B	End	38,817,700 bp
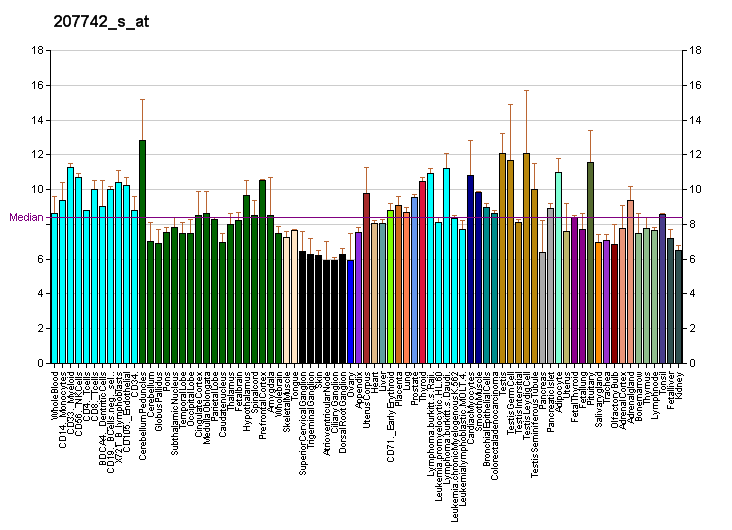

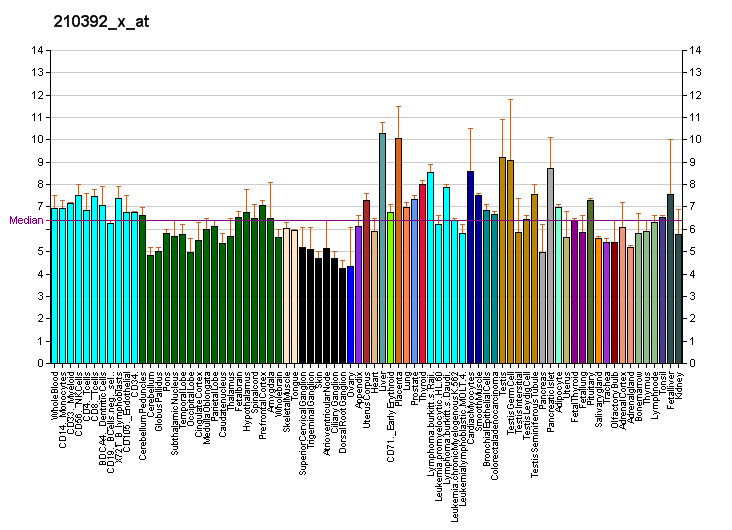

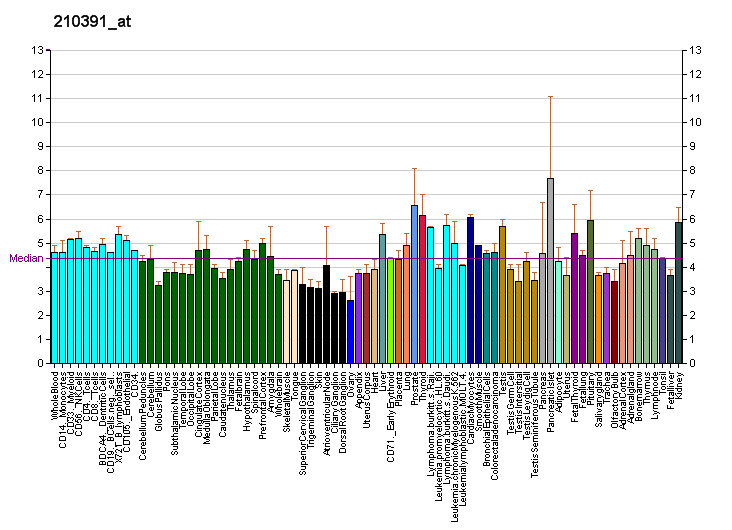
RNA expression pattern
Bgee	Human / Mouse (ortholog); Top expressed in: testicle; gonad; oocyte; secondary oocyte; buccal mucosa cell; right testis; left testis; sperm; left lobe of thyroid gland; right lobe of thyroid gland / Top expressed in: primitive streak; spermatid; epiblast; seminiferous tubule; secondary oocyte; lumbar spinal ganglion; zygote; spermatocyte; primary oocyte; yolk sac; More reference expression data
BioGPS	More reference expression data
Gene ontology
Molecular function	DNA binding; sequence-specific DNA binding; protein homodimerization activity; DNA-binding transcription factor activity; zinc ion binding; DNA-binding transcription activator activity, RNA polymerase II-specific; metal ion binding; steroid hormone receptor activity; nuclear receptor activity; RNA polymerase II cis-regulatory region sequence-specific DNA binding; DNA-binding transcription factor activity, RNA polymerase II-specific
Cellular component	nucleoplasm; nucleus; transcription regulator complex
Biological process	regulation of transcription, DNA-templated; negative regulation of transcription by RNA polymerase II; transcription, DNA-templated; gamete generation; spermatogenesis; transcription initiation from RNA polymerase II promoter; cell population proliferation; positive regulation of transcription by RNA polymerase II; intracellular steroid hormone receptor signaling pathway; intracellular receptor signaling pathway; steroid hormone mediated signaling pathway; transcription by RNA polymerase II
Sources:Amigo / QuickGO
Orthologs
Databases	NCBI: entry; OMA: entry
Species	Human	Mouse
Entrez	2649	14536
Ensembl	ENSG00000148200	ENSMUSG00000063972
UniProt	Q15406	Q64249
RefSeq (mRNA)	NM_001278546; NM_001489; NM_033334; NM_033335	NM_001159548; NM_001159549; NM_010264
RefSeq (protein)	NP_001265475; NP_001480; NP_201591; NP_201591.2	NP_001153020; NP_001153021; NP_034394
Location (UCSC)	Chr 9: 124.52 – 124.77 Mb	Chr 2: 38.61 – 38.82 Mb
PubMed search
- Wikidata
View/Edit Human	View/Edit Mouse

The germ cell nuclear factor (GCNF), also known as RTR (retinoid receptor-related testis-associated receptor) or NR6A1 (nuclear receptor subfamily 6, group A, member 1), is a protein that in humans is encoded by the NR6A1 gene. GCNF is a member of the nuclear receptor family of intracellular transcription factors .

In adults, GCNH is expressed mainly in the germ cells of gonads and is involved in the regulation of embryogenesis and germ cell differentiation.

Its expression pattern suggests that it may be involved in neurogenesis and germ cell development. The protein can homodimerize and bind DNA, but in vivo targets have not been identified. The gene expresses three alternatively spliced transcript variants.

In cells undergoing homologous recombination during meiosis, DNA intermediates are processed as an essential step in the exchange of information between parental homologous chromosomes. In eukaryotes the RTR complex, which consists of a type IA topoisomerase, a RecQ helicase and the structural protein RMI1, is employed in processing DNA recombination intermediates.
