= Vesicular inhibitory amino acid transporter =

Protein-coding gene in the species Homo sapiens

SLC32A1

Identifiers
- Aliases: SLC32A1, VGAT, VIAAT, solute carrier family 32 member 1
- External IDs: OMIM: 616440; MGI: 1194488; GeneCards: SLC32A1

Gene location (Human)
Chr.	Chromosome 20 (human)
Band	20q11.23	Start	38,724,486 bp
Band	20q11.23	End	38,729,372 bp

Gene location (Mouse)
Chr.	Chromosome 2 (mouse)
Band	2|2 H1	Start	158,452,687 bp
Band	2|2 H1	End	158,457,668 bp
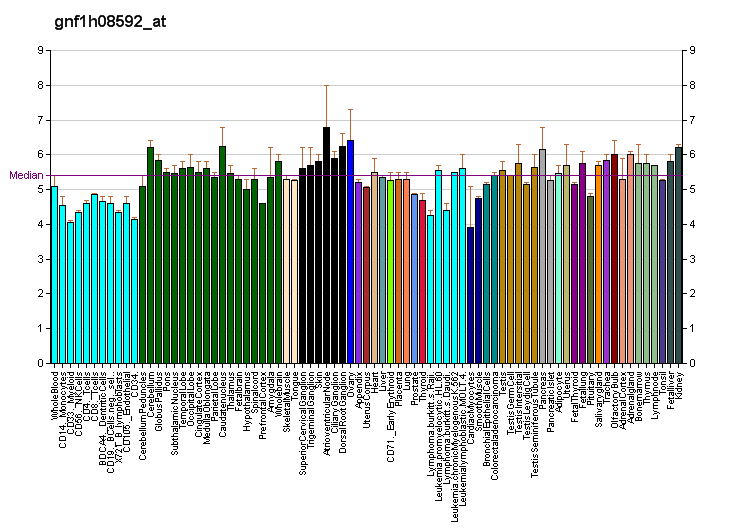
RNA expression pattern
Bgee	Human / Mouse (ortholog); Top expressed in: nucleus accumbens; putamen; prefrontal cortex; caudate nucleus; endothelial cell; external globus pallidus; cingulate gyrus; anterior cingulate cortex; middle temporal gyrus; right frontal lobe / Top expressed in: dorsal tegmental nucleus; nucleus accumbens; nucleus of stria terminalis; lateral septal nucleus; superior colliculus; globus pallidus; central gray substance of midbrain; medulla oblongata; Rostral migratory stream; olfactory tubercle; More reference expression data
BioGPS	More reference expression data
Gene ontology
Molecular function	glycine transmembrane transporter activity; amino acid transmembrane transporter activity; gamma-aminobutyric acid:proton symporter activity
Cellular component	integral component of membrane; membrane; synaptic vesicle; plasma membrane; clathrin-sculpted gamma-aminobutyric acid transport vesicle membrane; synapse; inhibitory synapse; synaptic vesicle membrane; presynaptic active zone; dendrite terminus; dendrite; cone cell pedicle; intracellular organelle; cell tip; neuron projection; neuron projection terminus; cytoplasmic vesicle membrane; cytoplasmic vesicle; integral component of synaptic vesicle membrane; GABA-ergic synapse
Biological process	amino acid transmembrane transport; ageing; ion transport; gamma-aminobutyric acid transport; neurotransmitter transport; hippocampus development; neurotransmitter secretion; glycine transport; neurotransmitter loading into synaptic vesicle
Sources:Amigo / QuickGO
Orthologs
Databases	NCBI: entry; OMA: entry
Species	Human	Mouse
Entrez	140679	22348
Ensembl	ENSG00000101438	ENSMUSG00000037771
UniProt	Q9H598	O35633
RefSeq (mRNA)	NM_080552	NM_009508
RefSeq (protein)	NP_542119	NP_033534
Location (UCSC)	Chr 20: 38.72 – 38.73 Mb	Chr 2: 158.45 – 158.46 Mb
PubMed search
- Wikidata
View/Edit Human	View/Edit Mouse

Vesicular inhibitory amino acid transporter is a protein that in humans is encoded by the SLC32A1 gene.

The protein encoded by this gene is an integral membrane protein involved in gamma-aminobutyric acid (GABA) and glycine uptake into synaptic vesicles. The encoded protein is a member of amino acid/polyamine transporter family II.

== See also ==
- Solute carrier family
