= SFRP2 =

Protein-coding gene in the species Homo sapiens

Identifiers
- Aliases: SFRP2, FRP-2, SARP1, SDF-5, secreted frizzled related protein 2
- External IDs: OMIM: 604157; MGI: 108078; HomoloGene: 56438; GeneCards: SFRP2; OMA:SFRP2 - orthologs

Gene location (Human)
Chr.	Chromosome 4 (human)
Band	4q31.3	Start	153,780,591 bp
Band	4q31.3	End	153,789,083 bp

Gene location (Mouse)
Chr.	Chromosome 3 (mouse)
Band	3 E3|3 37.37 cM	Start	83,673,628 bp
Band	3 E3|3 37.37 cM	End	83,681,623 bp
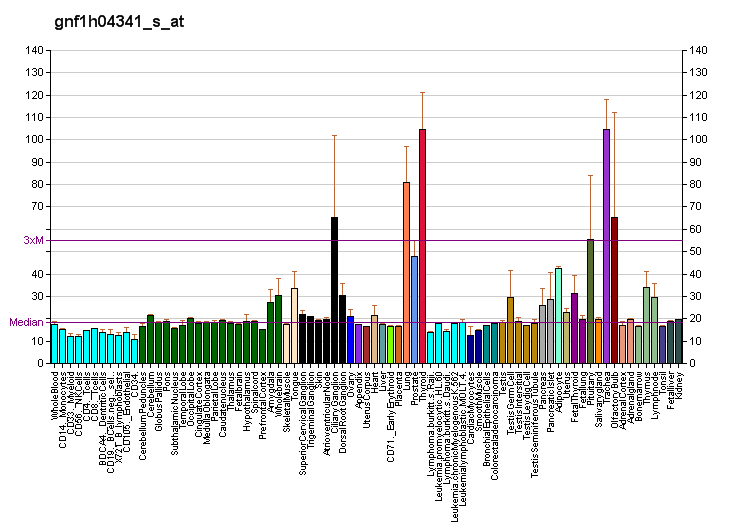

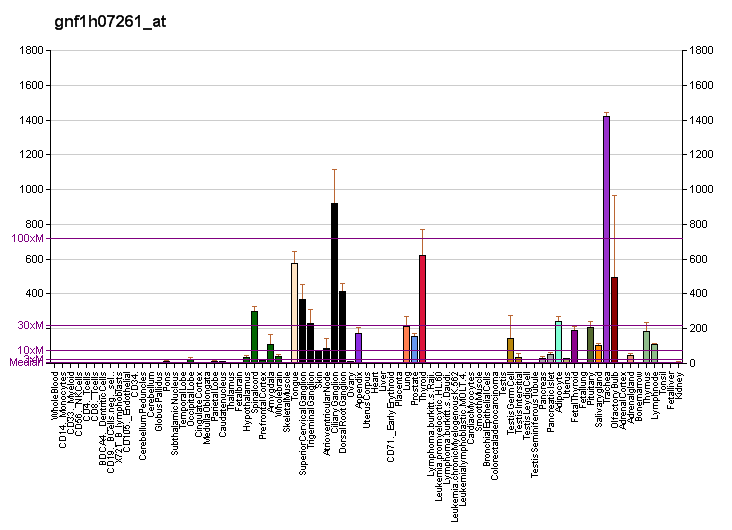
RNA expression pattern
Bgee	Human / Mouse (ortholog); Top expressed in: skin of arm; parietal pleura; gallbladder; vena cava; skin of thigh; trachea; skin of hip; lactiferous duct; pericardium; ventricular zone / Top expressed in: ascending aorta; aortic valve; calvaria; hand; endocardial cushion; renal corpuscle; condyle; fossa; internal carotid artery; external carotid artery; More reference expression data
BioGPS	More reference expression data
Gene ontology
Molecular function	fibronectin binding; receptor ligand activity; endopeptidase activator activity; integrin binding; enzyme activator activity; G protein-coupled receptor activity; Wnt-protein binding; Wnt-activated receptor activity
Cellular component	extracellular matrix; extracellular region; extracellular space; integral component of membrane; collagen-containing extracellular matrix
Biological process	cellular response to extracellular stimulus; positive regulation of endopeptidase activity; Wnt signaling pathway involved in somitogenesis; somitogenesis; cell differentiation; negative regulation of cysteine-type endopeptidase activity involved in apoptotic process; male gonad development; regulation of establishment of planar polarity; response to nutrient; collagen fibril organization; convergent extension involved in axis elongation; development of primary male sexual characteristics; positive regulation of canonical Wnt signaling pathway; negative regulation of mesodermal cell fate specification; cellular response to X-ray; cell-cell signaling; negative regulation of Wnt signaling pathway; bone morphogenesis; hematopoietic stem cell proliferation; chondrocyte development; embryonic digit morphogenesis; outflow tract morphogenesis; cardiac left ventricle morphogenesis; negative regulation of intrinsic apoptotic signaling pathway in response to DNA damage; Wnt signaling pathway; negative regulation of gene expression; sclerotome development; positive regulation of peptidyl-serine phosphorylation; positive regulation of angiogenesis; planar cell polarity pathway involved in neural tube closure; negative regulation of BMP signaling pathway; multicellular organism development; negative regulation of cardiac muscle cell apoptotic process; regulation of apoptotic process; positive regulation of cell growth; neural tube closure; negative regulation of peptidyl-tyrosine phosphorylation; negative regulation of cell migration; positive regulation of osteoblast differentiation; regulation of Wnt signaling pathway; cartilage development; regulation of cell population proliferation; regulation of stem cell division; negative regulation of extrinsic apoptotic signaling pathway via death domain receptors; negative regulation of cell growth; neural tube development; positive regulation of cell population proliferation; negative regulation of epithelial cell proliferation; positive regulation of apoptotic process; branching involved in blood vessel morphogenesis; post-anal tail morphogenesis; negative regulation of dermatome development; negative regulation of planar cell polarity pathway involved in axis elongation; positive regulation of cell adhesion mediated by integrin; negative regulation of transcription, DNA-templated; negative regulation of JUN kinase activity; positive regulation of fat cell differentiation; negative regulation of epithelial to mesenchymal transition; negative regulation of cell population proliferation; positive regulation of transcription by RNA polymerase II; digestive tract morphogenesis; anterior/posterior pattern specification; apoptotic process; negative regulation of canonical Wnt signaling pathway; regulation of midbrain dopaminergic neuron differentiation; regulation of neuron projection development; G protein-coupled receptor signaling pathway; non-canonical Wnt signaling pathway; regulation of signaling receptor activity; canonical Wnt signaling pathway
Sources:Amigo / QuickGO
Orthologs
Species	Human	Mouse
Entrez	6423	20319
Ensembl	ENSG00000145423	ENSMUSG00000027996
UniProt	Q96HF1	P97299
RefSeq (mRNA)	NM_003013	NM_009144
RefSeq (protein)	NP_003004	NP_033170
Location (UCSC)	Chr 4: 153.78 – 153.79 Mb	Chr 3: 83.67 – 83.68 Mb
PubMed search
- Wikidata
View/Edit Human	View/Edit Mouse

Secreted frizzled-related protein 2 is a protein that in humans is encoded by the SFRP2 gene. This gene encodes a member of the SFRP family that contains a cysteine-rich domain homologous to the putative Wnt-binding site of Frizzled proteins. SFRPs act as soluble modulators of Wnt signaling. Methylation of this gene is a potential marker for the presence of colorectal cancer.

New cardiomyocytes can be regenerated in the mouse heart via Sfrp2 and this may lead to treatment of heart injury .

== Cancer ==
SFRP2 gene has been detected progressively overexpressed in Human papillomavirus-positive neoplastic keratinocytes derived from uterine cervical preneoplastic lesions at different levels of malignancy. For this reason, this gene is likely to be associated with tumorigenesis and may be a potential prognostic marker for uterine cervical preneoplastic lesions progression.
