= GNL3 =

Protein-coding gene in the species Homo sapiens

Identifiers
- Aliases: GNL3, C77032, E2IG3, NNP47, NS, G protein nucleolar 3
- External IDs: OMIM: 608011; MGI: 1353651; GeneCards: GNL3

Gene location (Mouse)
Chr.	Chromosome 14 (mouse)
Band	14 B|14 19.09 cM	Start	30,734,390 bp
Band	14 B|14 19.09 cM	End	30,741,109 bp
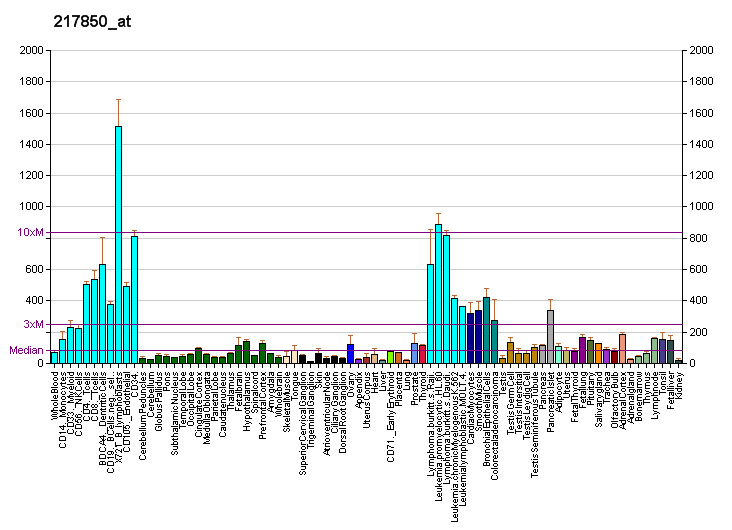
RNA expression pattern
Bgee	Human / Mouse (ortholog); Top expressed in: Achilles tendon; body of pancreas; islet of Langerhans; minor salivary glands; rectum; thymus; peritoneum; skin of abdomen; anterior pituitary; left uterine tube / Top expressed in: tail of embryo; epiblast; genital tubercle; embryo; morula; embryo; ovary; uterus; blastocyst; placenta; More reference expression data
BioGPS	More reference expression data
Gene ontology
Molecular function	nucleotide binding; GTP binding; protein binding; RNA binding; GTPase activity; mRNA 5'-UTR binding
Cellular component	membrane; nucleus; nucleoplasm; nucleolus; extracellular space; nuclear body
Biological process	positive regulation of protein localization to chromosome, telomeric region; positive regulation of telomere maintenance; cell population proliferation; regulation of cell population proliferation; positive regulation of pri-miRNA transcription by RNA polymerase II; positive regulation of protein sumoylation; stem cell division; stem cell population maintenance; ribosome biogenesis
Sources:Amigo / QuickGO
Orthologs
Databases	NCBI: entry
Species	Human	Mouse
Entrez	26354	30877
Ensembl	n/a	ENSMUSG00000042354
UniProt	Q9BVP2	Q8CI11
RefSeq (mRNA)	NM_206826; NM_014366; NM_206825	NM_153547; NM_178846
RefSeq (protein)	NP_055181; NP_996561; NP_996562	NP_705775
Location (UCSC)	n/a	Chr 14: 30.73 – 30.74 Mb
PubMed search
- Wikidata
View/Edit Human	View/Edit Mouse

Guanine nucleotide-binding protein-like 3, also known as nucleostemin, is a protein that in humans is encoded by the GNL3 gene. It is found within the nucleolus that binds p53. Nucleostemin regulates the cell cycle and affects cell differentiation, decreasing in amount as this differentiation progresses. It is a marker for many stem cells and cancer cells.

== Interactions ==
GNL3 has been shown to interact with Mdm2 and P53.
