= Hippo signaling pathway =

Signaling pathway that controls organ size

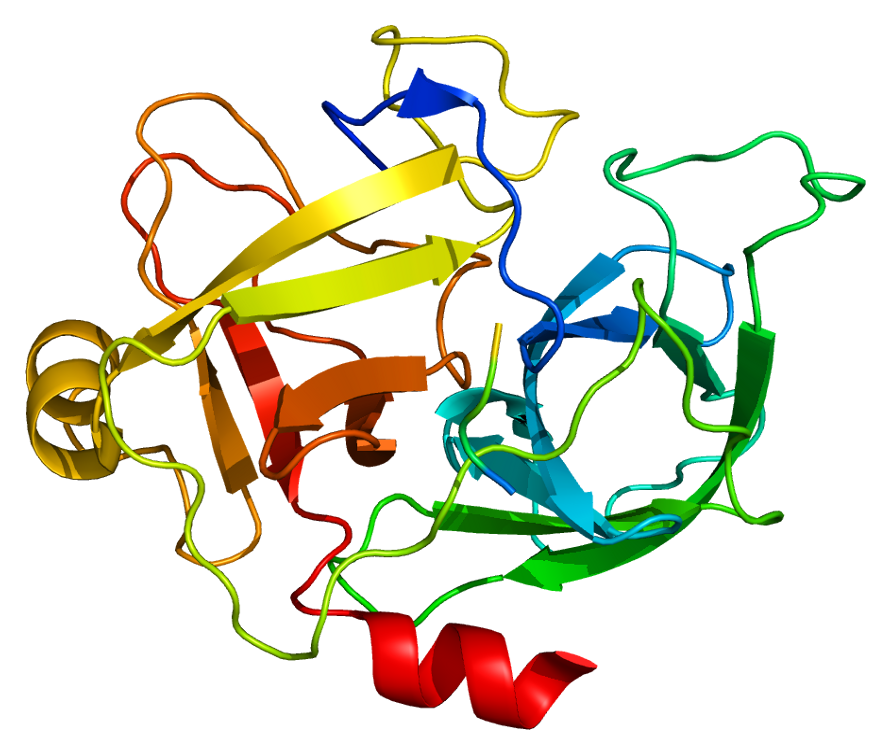
MST1, the human homologue of the Hippo protein, is part of the Hippo signalling pathway in humans

The Hippo signaling pathway, also known as the Salvador-Warts-Hippo (SWH) pathway, is a signaling pathway that controls organ size in animals through the regulation of cell proliferation and apoptosis. The pathway takes its name from one of its key signaling components—the protein kinase Hippo (Hpo). Mutations in this gene lead to tissue overgrowth, or a "hippopotamus"-like phenotype.

A fundamental question in developmental biology is how an organ knows to stop growing after reaching a particular size. Organ growth relies on several processes occurring at the cellular level, including cell division and programmed cell death (or apoptosis). The Hippo signaling pathway is involved in restraining cell proliferation and promoting apoptosis. As many cancers are marked by unchecked cell division, this signaling pathway has become increasingly significant in the study of human cancer. The Hippo pathway also has a critical role in stem cell and tissue specific progenitor cell self-renewal and expansion.

The Hippo signaling pathway appears to be highly conserved. While most of the Hippo pathway components were identified in the fruit fly (Drosophila melanogaster) using mosaic genetic screens, orthologs to these components (genes that are related through speciation events and thus tend to retain the same function in different species) have subsequently been found in mammals. Thus, the delineation of the pathway in Drosophila has helped to identify many genes that function as oncogenes or tumor suppressors in mammals.

== Mechanism ==
The Hippo pathway consists of a core kinase cascade in which Hpo phosphorylates (Drosophila) the protein kinase Warts (Wts). Hpo (MST1/2 in mammals) is a member of the Ste-20 family of protein kinases. This highly conserved group of serine/threonine kinases regulates several cellular processes, including cell proliferation, apoptosis, and various stress responses. Once phosphorylated, Wts (LATS1/2 in mammals) becomes active. Misshapen (Msn, MAP4K4/6/7 in mammals) and Happyhour (Hppy, MAP4K1/2/3/5 in mammals) act in parallel to Hpo to activate Wts. Wts is a nuclear DBF-2-related kinase. These kinases are known regulators of cell cycle progression, growth, and development. Two proteins are known to facilitate the activation of Wts: Salvador (Sav) and Mob as tumor suppressor (Mats). Sav (SAV1 in mammals) is a WW domain-containing protein, meaning that this protein contains a sequence of amino acids in which a tryptophan and an invariant proline are highly conserved. Hpo can bind to and phosphorylate Sav, which may function as a scaffold protein because this Hpo-Sav interaction promotes phosphorylation of Wts. Hpo can also phosphorylate and activate Mats (MOBKL1A/B in mammals), which allows Mats to associate with and strengthen the kinase activity of Wts.

Activated Wts can then go on to phosphorylate and inactivate the transcriptional coactivator Yorkie (Yki). Yki is unable to bind DNA by itself. In its active state, Yki binds to the transcription factor Scalloped (Sd), and the Yki-Sd complex becomes localized to the nucleus. This allows for the expression of several genes that promote organ growth, such as cyclin E, which promotes cell cycle progression, and diap1 (Drosophila inhibitor of apoptosis protein-1), which, as its name suggests, prevents apoptosis. Yki also activates expression of the bantam microRNA, a positive growth regulator that specifically affects cell number. Thus, the inactivation of Yki by Wts inhibits growth through the transcriptional repression of these pro-growth regulators. By phosphorylating Yki at serine 168, Wts promotes the association of Yki with 14-3-3 proteins, which help to anchor Yki in the cytoplasm and prevent its transport to the nucleus. In mammals, the two Yki orthologs are Yes-associated protein (YAP) and transcriptional coactivator with PDZ-binding motif (WWTR1, also known as TAZ). When activated, YAP and TAZ can bind to several transcription factors including p73, Runx2 and several TEADs. YAP regulates the expression of Hoxa1 and Hoxc13 in mouse and human epithelial cells in vivo and in vitro.

The upstream regulators of the core Hpo/Wts kinase cascade include the transmembrane protein Fat and several membrane-associated proteins. As an atypical cadherin, Fat (FAT1-4 in mammals) may function as a receptor, though an extracellular ligand has not been positively identified. The GPI-anchored cell surface protein glypican-3 (GPC3) is known to interact with Fat1 in human liver cancer. GPC3 is also shown to modulate Yap signaling in liver cancer. While Fat is known to bind to another atypical cadherin, Dachsous (Ds), during tissue patterning, it is unclear what role Ds has in regulating tissue growth. Nevertheless, Fat is recognized as an upstream regulator of the Hpo pathway. Fat activates Hpo through the apical protein Expanded (Ex; FRMD6/Willin in mammals). Ex interacts with two other apically-localized proteins, Kibra (KIBRA in mammals) and Merlin (Mer; NF2 in mammals), to form the Kibra-Ex-Mer (KEM) complex. Both Ex and Mer are FERM domain-containing proteins, while Kibra, like Sav, is a WW domain-containing protein. The KEM complex physically interacts with the Hpo kinase cascade, thereby localizing the core kinase cascade to the plasma membrane for activation. Fat may also regulate Wts independently of Ex/Hpo, through the inhibition of the unconventional myosin Dachs. Normally, Dachs can bind to and promote the degradation of Wts.

== In cancer ==
In fruitfly, the Hippo signaling pathway involves a kinase cascade involving the Salvador (Sav), Warts (Wts) and Hippo (Hpo) protein kinases. Many of the genes involved in the Hippo signaling pathway are recognized as tumor suppressors, while Yki/YAP/TAZ is identified as an oncogene. YAP/TAZ can reprogram cancer cells into cancer stem cells. YAP has been found to be elevated in some human cancers, including breast cancer, colorectal cancer, and liver cancer. This may be explained by YAP's recently defined role in overcoming contact inhibition, a fundamental growth control property of normal cells in vitro and in vivo, in which proliferation stops after cells reach confluence (in culture) or occupy maximum available space inside the body and touch one another. This property is typically lost in cancerous cells, allowing them to proliferate in an uncontrolled manner. In fact, YAP overexpression antagonizes contact inhibition.

Many of the pathway components recognized as tumor suppressor genes are mutated in human cancers. For example, mutations in Fat4 have been found in breast cancer, while NF2 is mutated in familial and sporadic schwannomas. Additionally, several human cancer cell lines invoke mutations of the SAV1 and MOBK1B proteins. However, recent research by Marc Kirschner and Taran Gujral has demonstrated that Hippo pathway components may play a more nuanced role in cancer than previously thought. Hippo pathway inactivation enhanced the effect of 15 FDA-approved oncology drugs by promoting chemo-retention. In another study, the Hippo pathway kinases LATS1/2 were found to suppress cancer immunity in mice. Not all studies, however, support a role for Hippo signaling in promoting carcinogenesis. In hepatocellular carcinoma, for instance, it was suggesting that AXIN1 mutations would provoke Hippo signaling pathway activation, fostering the cancer development, but a recent study demonstrated that such an effect cannot be detected. Thus the exact role of Hippo signaling in the cancer process awaits further elucidation.

=== As a drug target ===
Two venture-backed oncology startups, Vivace Therapeutics and the General Biotechnologies subsidiary Nivien Therapeutics, are actively developing kinase inhibitors targeting the Hippo pathway.

== Regulation of human organ size ==
The heart is the first organ formed during mammalian development. A properly sized and functional heart is vital throughout the entire lifespan. Loss of cardiomyocytes because of injury or diseases leads to heart failure, which is a major cause of human morbidity and mortality. Unfortunately, regenerative potential of the adult heart is limited. The Hippo pathway is a recently identified signaling cascade that plays an evolutionarily conserved role in organ size control by inhibiting cell proliferation, promoting apoptosis, regulating fates of stem/progenitor cells, and in some circumstances, limiting cell size. Research indicates a key role of this pathway in regulation of cardiomyocyte proliferation and heart size. Inactivation of the Hippo pathway or activation of its downstream effector, the Yes-associated protein transcription coactivator, improves cardiac regeneration. Several known upstream signals of the Hippo pathway such as mechanical stress, G-protein-coupled receptor signaling, and oxidative stress are known to play critical roles in cardiac physiology. In addition, Yes-associated protein has been shown to regulate cardiomyocyte fate through multiple transcriptional mechanisms.

== Gene name confusion ==
Note that Hippo TAZ protein is often confused with the gene TAZ, which is unrelated to the Hippo pathway. The gene TAZ produces the protein tafazzin. The official gene name for the Hippo TAZ protein is WWTR1. Also, the official names for MST1 and MST2 are STK4 and STK3, respectively. All databases for bioinformatics use the official gene symbols, and commercial sources for PCR primers or siRNA also go by the official gene names.

== Summary table ==
Drosophila melanogaster	Human ortholog(s)	Protein description and role in Hippo signaling pathway
Dachsous (Ds)	DCHS1, DCHS2	Atypical cadherin that may act as a ligand for the Fat receptor
Fat (Ft)	FAT1, FAT2, FAT3, FAT4	Atypical cadherin that may act as a receptor for the Hippo pathway
Expanded (Ex)	FRMD6	FERM domain-containing apical protein that associates with Kibra and Mer as an upstream regulator of the core kinase cascade
Dachs (Dachs)		Unconventional myosin that can bind Wts, promoting its degradation
Kibra (Kibra)	WWC1	WW domain-containing apical protein that associates with Ex and Mer as an upstream regulator of the core kinase cascade
Merlin (Mer)	NF2	FERM domain-containing apical protein that associates with Ex and Kibra as an upstream regulator of the core kinase cascade
Hippo (Hpo)	MST1, MST2 – officially STK4/3	Sterile-20-type kinase that phosphorylates and activates Wts
Salvador (Sav)	SAV1	WW domain-containing protein that may act as a scaffold protein, facilitating Warts phosphorylation by Hippo
Warts (Wts)	LATS1, LATS2	Nuclear DBF-2-related kinase that phosphorylates and inactivates Yki
Mob as tumor suppressor (Mats)	MOBKL1A, MOBKL1B	Kinase that associates with Wts to potentiate its catalytic activity
Yorkie (Yki)	YAP, TAZ – officially WWTR1	Transcriptional coactivator that binds to Sd in its active, unphosphorylated form to activate expression of transcriptional targets that promote cell growth, cell proliferation, and prevent apoptosis
Scalloped (Sd)	TEAD1, TEAD2, TEAD3, TEAD4	Transcription factor that binds Yki to regulate target gene expression
