= YAP1 =

Protein-coding gene in the species Homo sapiens

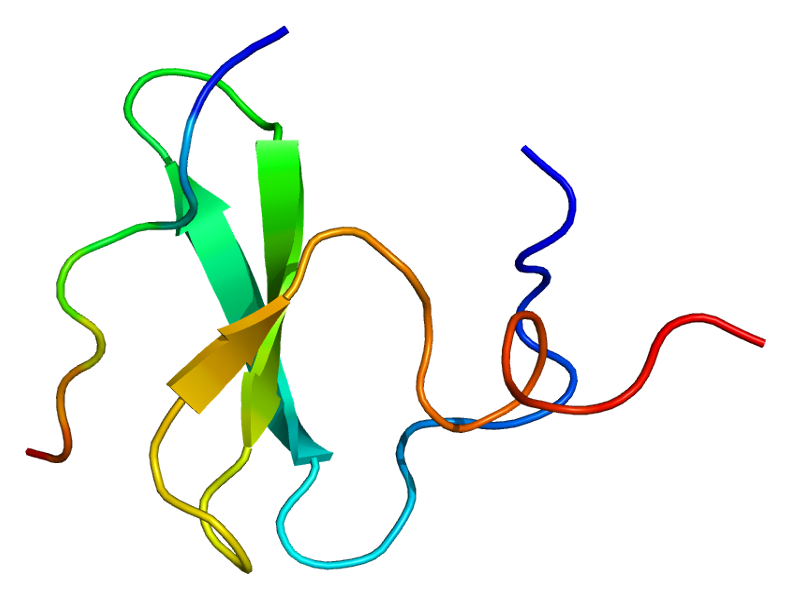

Identifiers
- Aliases: YAP1, COB1, YAP, YAP2, YAP65, YKI, Yes associated protein 1, Yap, Yes1 associated transcriptional regulator, YAP-1
- External IDs: OMIM: 606608; MGI: 103262; GeneCards: YAP1
Available structures
PDB	Ortholog search: PDBe RCSB
PDB	List of PDB id codes 1JMQ, 1K5R, 1K9Q, 1K9R, 2LAW, 2LAX, 2LAY, 2LTV, 2LTW, 3KYS, 3MHR, 4RE1, 4REX

Gene location (Human)
Chr.	Chromosome 11 (human)
Band	11q22.1	Start	102,110,447 bp
Band	11q22.1	End	102,233,424 bp

Gene location (Mouse)
Chr.	Chromosome 9 (mouse)
Band	9|9 A1	Start	7,932,000 bp
Band	9|9 A1	End	8,004,597 bp
RNA expression pattern
Bgee	Human / Mouse (ortholog); Top expressed in: saphenous vein; germinal epithelium; tail of epididymis; urethra; seminal vesicula; human penis; parietal pleura; superficial temporal artery; pericardium; corpus epididymis / Top expressed in: zygote; secondary oocyte; primary oocyte; internal carotid artery; primitive streak; vestibular membrane of cochlear duct; external carotid artery; hair follicle; retinal pigment epithelium; utricle; More reference expression data
BioGPS	n/a
Gene ontology
Molecular function	transcription corepressor activity; protein binding; protein heterodimerization activity; RNA polymerase II cis-regulatory region sequence-specific DNA binding; chromatin binding; transcription coactivator activity; protein C-terminus binding; proline-rich region binding; transcription factor binding
Cellular component	cytoplasm; nucleoplasm; nucleus; transcription regulator complex; cytosol; membrane
Biological process	regulation of transcription, DNA-templated; contact inhibition; transcription, DNA-templated; cellular response to DNA damage stimulus; cellular response to gamma radiation; transcription initiation from RNA polymerase II promoter; cell population proliferation; regulation of neurogenesis; negative regulation of nucleic acid-templated transcription; positive regulation of transcription, DNA-templated; regulation of hematopoietic stem cell differentiation; response to progesterone; positive regulation of intracellular estrogen receptor signaling pathway; progesterone receptor signaling pathway; cell morphogenesis; vasculogenesis; embryonic heart tube morphogenesis; positive regulation of cell population proliferation; regulation of keratinocyte proliferation; keratinocyte differentiation; negative regulation of epithelial cell differentiation; notochord development; somatic stem cell population maintenance; hippo signaling; regulation of cell population proliferation; positive regulation of transcription by RNA polymerase II; positive regulation of organ growth; paraxial mesoderm development; lateral mesoderm development; bud elongation involved in lung branching; lung epithelial cell differentiation; regulation of canonical Wnt signaling pathway; cellular response to retinoic acid; regulation of stem cell proliferation; regulation of metanephric nephron tubule epithelial cell differentiation; positive regulation of canonical Wnt signaling pathway; positive regulation of stem cell population maintenance; negative regulation of stem cell differentiation; negative regulation of extrinsic apoptotic signaling pathway; protein-containing complex assembly; tissue homeostasis; heart process; positive regulation of cardiac muscle cell proliferation; cardiac muscle tissue regeneration; regulation of gene expression
Sources:Amigo / QuickGO
Orthologs
Databases	NCBI: entry; OMA: entry
Species	Human	Mouse
Entrez	10413	22601
Ensembl	ENSG00000137693	ENSMUSG00000053110
UniProt	P46937	P46938
RefSeq (mRNA)	NM_001130145; NM_001195044; NM_001195045; NM_001282097; NM_001282098 NM_001282099; NM_001282100; NM_001282101; NM_006106	NM_001171147; NM_009534
RefSeq (protein)	NP_001123617; NP_001181973; NP_001181974; NP_001269026; NP_001269027 NP_001269028; NP_001269029; NP_001269030; NP_006097	NP_001164618; NP_033560
Location (UCSC)	Chr 11: 102.11 – 102.23 Mb	Chr 9: 7.93 – 8 Mb
PubMed search
- Wikidata
View/Edit Human	View/Edit Mouse

YAP1 (yes-associated protein 1), also known as YAP or YAP65, is a protein that acts as a transcription coregulator that promotes transcription of genes involved in cellular proliferation and suppressing apoptotic genes. YAP1 is a component in the hippo signaling pathway which regulates organ size, regeneration, and tumorigenesis. YAP1 was first identified by virtue of its ability to associate with the SH3 domain of Yes and Src protein tyrosine kinases. YAP1 is a potent oncogene, which is amplified in various human cancers.

== Structure ==
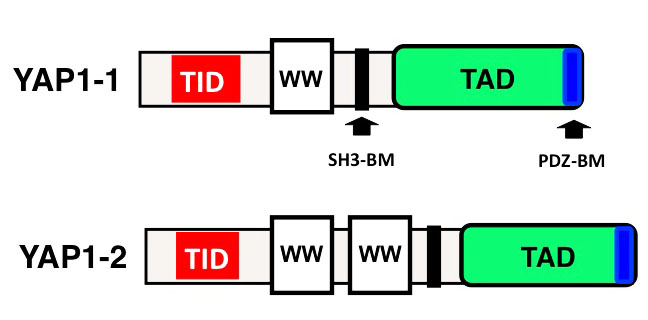
Modular Structure of YAP1 Isoforms

Cloning of the YAP1 gene facilitated the identification of a modular protein domain, known as the WW domain. Two splice isoforms of the YAP1 gene product were initially identified, named YAP1-1 and YAP1-2, which differed by the presence of an extra 38 amino acids that encoded the WW domain. Apart from the WW domain, the modular structure of YAP1 contains a proline-rich region at the very amino terminus, which is followed by a TID (TEAD transcription factor interacting domain). Next, following a single WW domain, which is present in the YAP1-1 isoform, and two WW domains, which are present in the YAP1-2 isoform, there is the SH3-BM (Src Homology 3 binding motif). Following the SH3-BM is a TAD (transactivation domain) and a PDZ domain-binding motif (PDZ-BM) (Figure 1).

== Function ==
YAP1 is a transcriptional co-activator and its proliferative and oncogenic activity is driven by its association with the TEAD family of transcription factors, which up-regulate genes that promote cell growth and inhibit apoptosis. Several other functional partners of YAP1 were identified, including RUNX, SMADs, p73, ErbB4, TP53BP2, LATS1/2, PTPN14, AMOTs, and ZO1/2. YAP1 and its close paralog, TAZ (WWTR1), are the main effectors of the Hippo tumor suppressor pathway. When the pathway is activated, YAP1 and TAZ are phosphorylated on a serine residue and sequestered in the cytoplasm by 14-3-3 proteins. When the Hippo pathway is not activated, YAP1/TAZ enter the nucleus and regulate gene expression.

It is reported that several genes are regulated by YAP1, including Birc2, Birc5, connective tissue growth factor (CTGF), amphiregulin (AREG), Cyr61, Hoxa1 and Hoxc13.

YAP/TAZ have also been shown to act as stiffness sensors, regulating mechanotransduction independently of the Hippo signalling cascade.

As YAP and TAZ are transcriptional co-activators, they do not have DNA-binding domains. Instead, when inside the nucleus, they regulate gene expression through TEAD1-4 which are sequence-specific transcription factors that mediate the main transcriptional output of the Hippo pathway. The YAP/TAZ and TEAD interaction competitively inhibits and actively dissociates the TEAD/VGLL4 interaction which functions as a transcriptional repressor. Mouse models with YAP over-expression have been shown to exhibit up-regulation of the TEAD target gene expression which results in increased expansion of progenitor cells and tissue overgrowth.

== Regulation ==
=== Biochemical ===
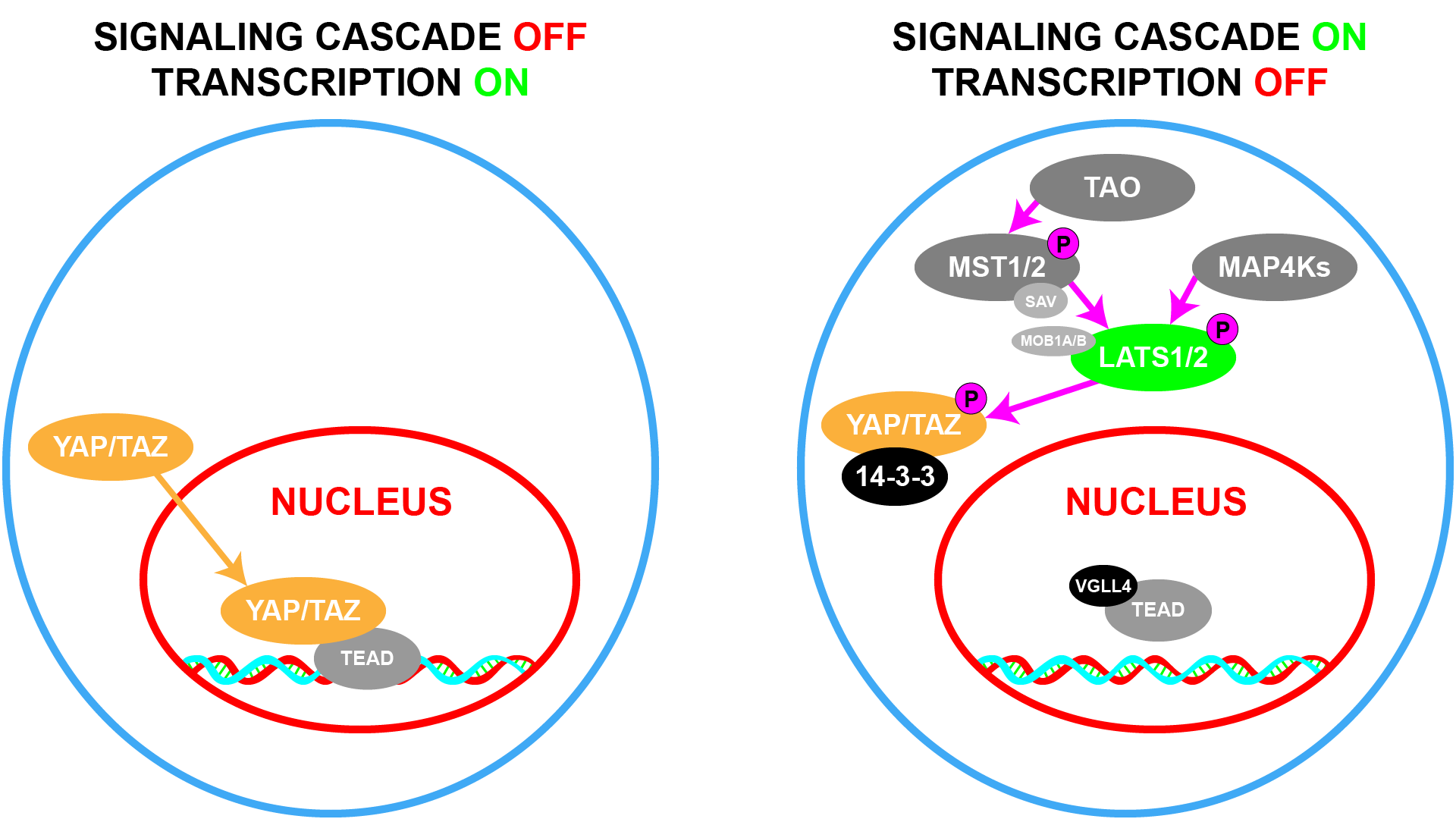
On the left, the signaling cascade is inactivated so YAP readily localizes to the nucleus for transcription. On the right, the signal cascade causes YAP to localize to the cytoplasm, preventing transcription.

At the biochemical level, YAP is part of and regulated by the Hippo signaling pathway where a kinase cascade results in its “inactivation”, along with that of TAZ. In this signaling cascade, TAO kinases phosphorylate Ste20-like kinases, MST1/2, at their activation loops (Thr183 for MST1 and Thr180 for MST2). Active MST1/2 then phosphorylate SAV1 and MOB1A/B which are scaffold proteins that assist in the recruitment and phosphorylation of LATS1/2. LATS1/2 can also be phosphorylated by two groups of MAP4Ks. LATS1/2 then phosphorylate YAP and TAZ which causes them to bind with 14-3-3, resulting in cytoplasmic sequestration of YAP and TAZ. The result of the activation of this pathway is the restriction of YAP/TAZ from entering the cell nucleus. Once inside the nucleus, physical association of YAP with binding partners such as beta-catenin mediates the recruitment of SWI/SNF complexes, which in turn generate DNA accessibility needed to activate enhancers.

=== Mechanotransductive ===
Additionally, YAP is regulated by mechanical cues such as extracellular matrix (ECM) rigidity, strain, shear stress, or adhesive area, processes that are reliant on cytoskeletal integrity. These mechanically induced localization phenomena are thought to be the result of nuclear flattening induced pore size change, mechanosensitive nuclear membrane ion channels, mechanical protein stability, or a variety of other factors. These mechanical factors have also been linked to certain cancer cells via nuclear softening and higher ECM stiffnesses. Under this framework, the nuclear softening phenotype of cancer cells would promote nuclear flattening in response to a force, causing YAP localization, which could explain its over-expression and promoted proliferation in oncogenic cells. Additionally, the higher ECM stiffness phenotype commonly seen in tumors due to enhanced integrin signaling could flatten the cell and nucleus, once again causing higher YAP nuclear localization. Likewise, the opposite effect of nuclear stiffening as a result of a variety of stimuli such as an over-expression of lamin A, has been shown to decrease nuclear YAP localization.

== Clinical significance ==
=== Cancer ===
Dysregulation of YAP/TAZ-mediated transcriptional activity is implicated in the development of abnormal cell growth and hyperactivation of YAP and TAZ has been observed amongst many cancers. Hence YAP1 represents a potential target for the treatment of cancer.

While YAP has been identified as a proto-oncogene, it can also act as a tumor suppressor depending on cellular context.

=== As a drug target ===
The YAP1 oncogene serves as a target for the development of new cancer drugs. Small compounds have been identified that disrupt the YAP1-TEAD complex or block the binding function of WW domains. These small molecules represent lead compounds for the development of therapies for cancer patients, who harbor amplified or overexpressed YAP oncogene.

=== Neuroprotection ===
The Hippo/YAP signaling pathway may exert neuroprotective effects through mitigating blood-brain barrier disruption after cerebral ischemia/reperfusion injury.

=== Mutations ===
Heterozygous loss-of-function mutations in the YAP1 gene have been identified in two families with major eye malformations with or without extra-ocular features such as hearing loss, cleft lip, intellectual disability and renal disease.
