= WWTR1 =

Protein-coding gene in the species Homo sapiens

Identifiers
- Aliases: WWTR1, TAZ, WW domain containing transcription regulator 1
- External IDs: OMIM: 607392; MGI: 1917649; GeneCards: WWTR1

Gene location (Human)
Chr.	Chromosome 3 (human)
Band	3q25.1	Start	149,517,235 bp
Band	3q25.1	End	149,736,714 bp

Gene location (Mouse)
Chr.	Chromosome 3 (mouse)
Band	3|3 D	Start	57,363,070 bp
Band	3|3 D	End	57,483,331 bp
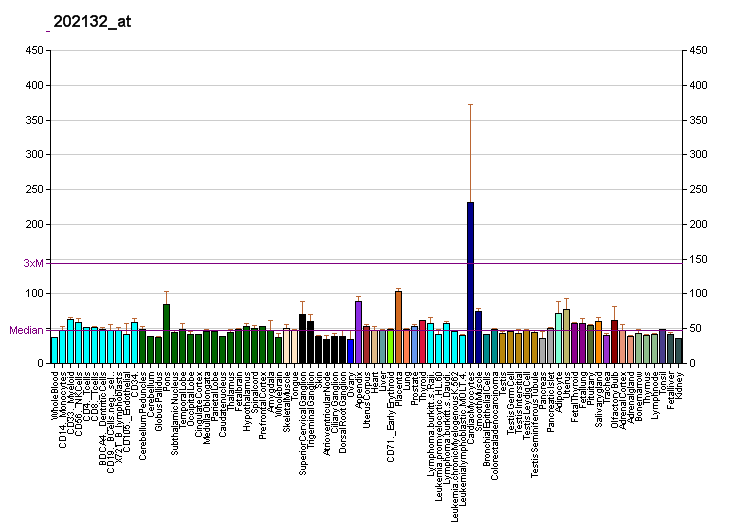

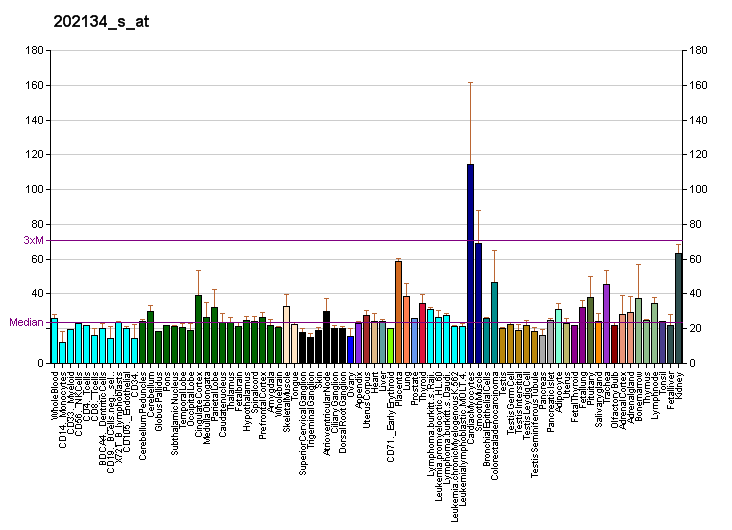
RNA expression pattern
Bgee	Human / Mouse (ortholog); Top expressed in: tibia; tail of epididymis; optic nerve; visceral pleura; tendon of biceps brachii; seminal vesicula; urethra; saphenous vein; epithelium of colon; lower lobe of lung / Top expressed in: left lung lobe; right lung lobe; atrioventricular valve; dermis; saccule; vestibular sensory epithelium; semi-lunar valve; body of femur; efferent ductule; endothelial cell of lymphatic vessel; More reference expression data
BioGPS	More reference expression data
Gene ontology
Molecular function	protein homodimerization activity; transcription corepressor activity; transcription coactivator activity; protein binding
Cellular component	cytoplasm; transcription regulator complex; nucleoplasm; nucleus; cytosol; nuclear body
Biological process	negative regulation of protein phosphorylation; cilium assembly; regulation of metanephric nephron tubule epithelial cell differentiation; negative regulation of fat cell differentiation; regulation of transcription, DNA-templated; negative regulation of protein kinase activity; multicellular organism growth; regulation of canonical Wnt signaling pathway; glomerulus development; negative regulation of transcription by RNA polymerase II; hippo signaling; positive regulation of epithelial to mesenchymal transition; regulation of SMAD protein signal transduction; SCF-dependent proteasomal ubiquitin-dependent protein catabolic process; mesenchymal cell differentiation; stem cell division; protein ubiquitination; osteoblast differentiation; kidney morphogenesis; positive regulation of cell population proliferation; transcription initiation from RNA polymerase II promoter; negative regulation of canonical Wnt signaling pathway; positive regulation of transcription by RNA polymerase II; transcription, DNA-templated; tissue homeostasis; heart process
Sources:Amigo / QuickGO
Orthologs
Databases	NCBI: entry; OMA: entry
Species	Human	Mouse
Entrez	25937	97064
Ensembl	ENSG00000018408	ENSMUSG00000027803
UniProt	Q9GZV5	Q9EPK5
RefSeq (mRNA)	NM_001168278; NM_001168280; NM_015472; NM_001348362	NM_001168281; NM_133784
RefSeq (protein)	NP_001161750; NP_001161752; NP_056287; NP_001335291	NP_001161753; NP_598545
Location (UCSC)	Chr 3: 149.52 – 149.74 Mb	Chr 3: 57.36 – 57.48 Mb
PubMed search
- Wikidata
View/Edit Human	View/Edit Mouse

WW domain-containing transcription regulator protein 1 (WWTR1), also known as Transcriptional coactivator with PDZ-binding motif (TAZ), is a protein that in humans is encoded by the WWTR1 gene. WWTR1 acts as a transcriptional coregulator and has no effect on transcription alone. When in complex with transcription factor binding partners, WWTR1 helps promote gene expression in pathways associated with development, cell growth and survival, and inhibiting apoptosis. Aberrant WWTR1 function has been implicated for its role in driving cancers. WWTR1 is often referred to as TAZ due to its initial characterization with the name TAZ. However, WWTR1 (TAZ) is not to be confused with the protein tafazzin, which originally held the official gene symbol TAZ, and is now TAFAZZIN.

== Structure ==
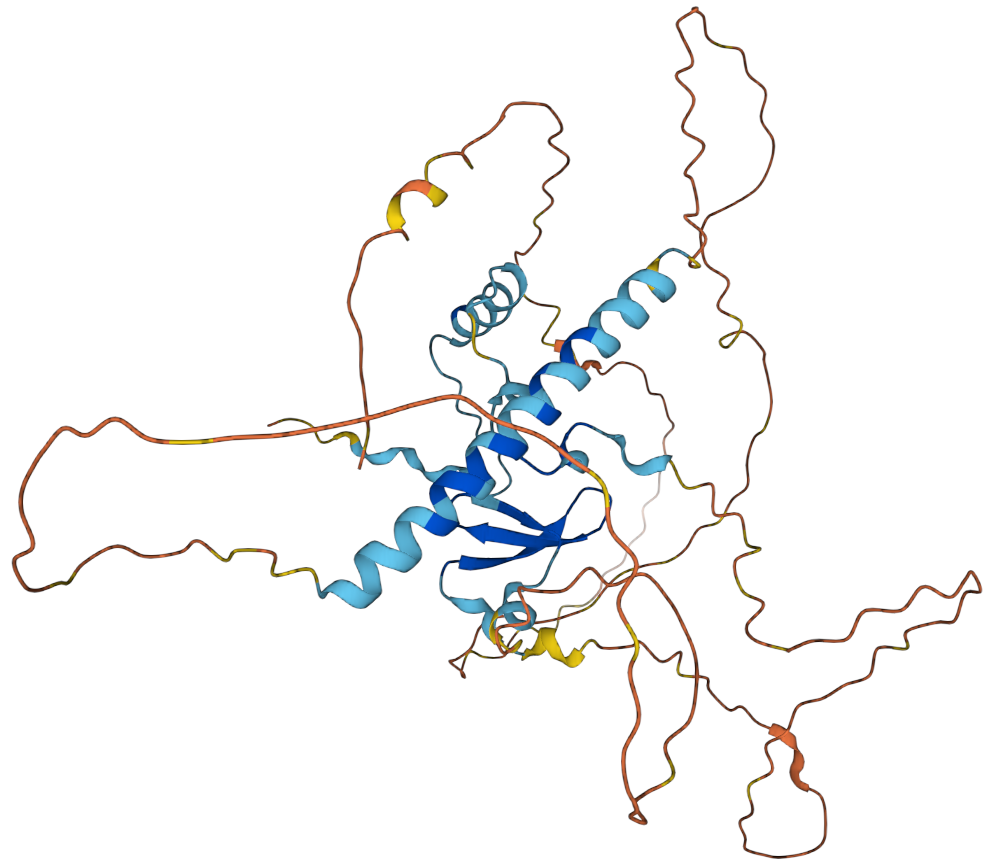
Protein structure of WWTR1 as predicted by AlphaFold.

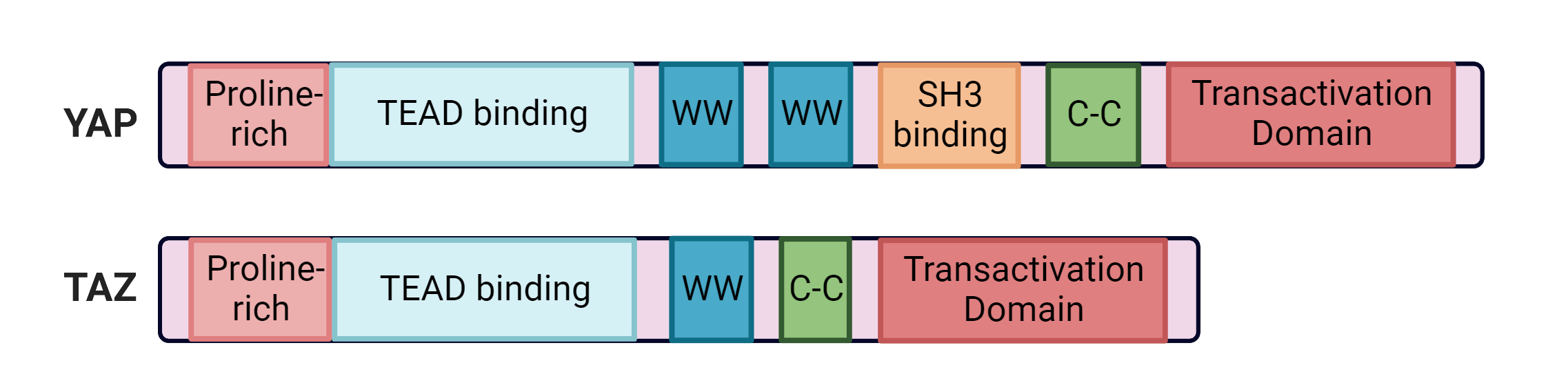
Differences in binding domains present on transcriptional coregulators, YAP and TAZ.

WWTR1 contains a proline rich region, TEAD binding motif, WW domain, coiled coil region, and a transactivation domain (TAD) containing the PDZ domain-binding motif. WWTR1 (TAZ) lacks a DNA binding domain so it can not directly drive transcription. WWTR1 exhibits conserved structural homology with another transcriptional coregulator, yes-associated protein 1 (YAP). Both YAP and TAZ are able to form homodimers and heterodimers with each other through interactions at the coil coil domain. YAP and TAZ cooperate with transcription factors to promote tissue formation. WWTR1 (TAZ) interacts with a variety of transcriptional partners, including the four TEA domain family members (TEAD1/2/3/4) through the TEAD-binding motif and several other factors containing the PPXY motif, which consists of a Proline-Proline-X (any amino acid)-Tyrosine sequence. Examples of such partners include Runx/PEBP2, AP2, C/EBP, c-Jun, Krox-20, Krox-24, MEF2B, NF-E2, Oct-4 and p73, which interact with WWTR1 via the WW domain. The transactivation domain at the C-terminal end (amino acids 165–395) was shown to be important in producing transcriptional effects.

== Function ==
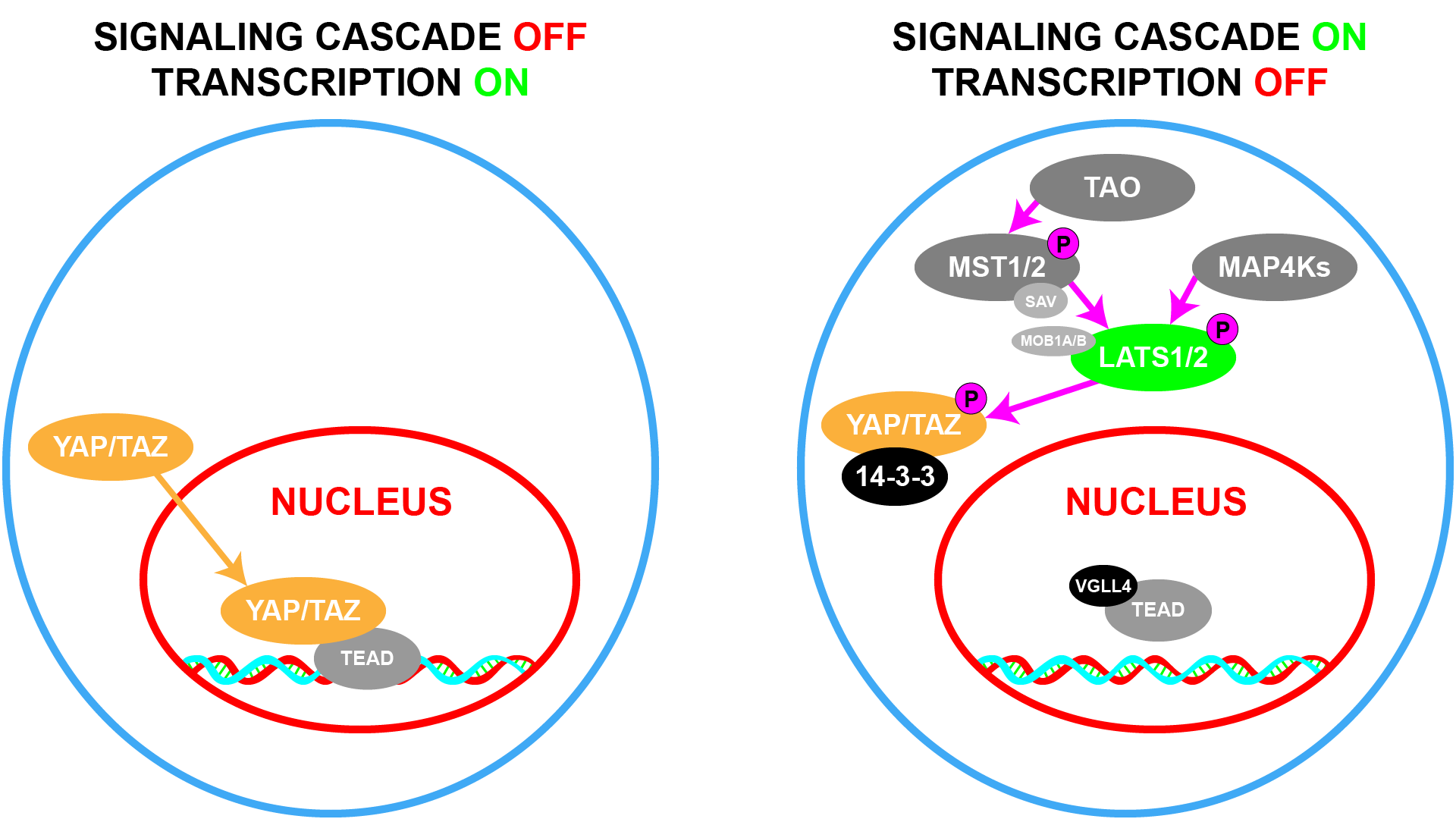
WWTR1 (TAZ) and the structurally similar protein, YAP, act as transcriptional coactivators and are regulated by Hippo pathway activation.

WWTR1 (TAZ) plays an important role in embryogenesis and development, which include regulation of organ size, stem cell renewal, tissue regeneration, osteogenesis, and angiogenesis. These functions are effected through coactivation of transcription factors that promote cell growth, migration, and differentiation, such as the four members of the TEAD transcription factor family, Paired box gene 3 (PAX3), and Runt related transcription factors (RUNX1/)2). The proliferative functions of WWTR1 (TAZ) and its paralog, YAP, are restricted by the Hippo signaling pathway. This suppressive pathway consists of a kinase signaling cascade, the core of which is made up of the serine-threonine kinases, STK3/MST2 and STK4/MST1, which when active and complexed with the regulatory protein, SAV1, will phosphorylate and activate the LATS1/2 kinases, which in complex with the regulatory protein, MOB1, phosphorylate and downstream inactivate YAP/TAZ. In this way, Hippo activation arrests cell growth by decreasing proliferative gene expression, leading to decreased cell death by ferroptosis and increased cell death by apoptosis.

=== Functional redundancy with YAP ===
==== Similarities ====
WWTR1 (TAZ) has a similar structural sequence and binding motifs to yes-associated protein 1 (YAP). YAP and TAZ are often considered functionally redundant in existing literature. Both play roles in organ size development as well as cell migration, wound healing, angiogenesis, and metabolism, particularly in lipogenesis. Inactivation of YAP and TAZ occurs through phosphorylation by kinases in the Hippo pathway, namely LATS1 and LATS2. This recruits the binding of the regulatory protein, 14-3-3, which prevents YAP/TAZ from localizing to the nucleus and marks it for ubiquitination, which allows it to be recognized for subsequent degradation by proteasomes.

==== Differences ====
TAZ is able to form both heterodimers and heterotetramers with TEADs to initiate transcription (TAZ-TEAD and TAZ-TEAD-TAZ-TEAD), while YAP is only able to form YAP-TEAD heterodimers. These differences impart unique functions to TAZ, such as in the regulation of adipocyte differentiation through interactions with the peroxisome proliferator-activated receptor (PPARγ), as well as osteogenesis through transcriptional coactivation of bone-specific transcription factors, such as RUNX2 (also known as Cbfa1.) Additionally, TAZ independently interacts with Nuclear factor of activated T-cells 5 (NFATC5) in order to repress transcription in renal cells that are undergoing osmotic stress. Both YAP and TAZ associate with Mothers against decapentaplegic family transcription factors (SMAD) complexes to promote TGF-beta signaling and drive differentiation and development, but upregulation of only TAZ occurs upon transduction of this cascade. TAZ is only able to complex with SMAD2, SMAD3, or SMAD4 to promote nuclear shuttling and transcription, but YAP can also interact with SMAD1 and SMAD7 in addition. In vivo murine studies have demonstrated that animals lacking functional TAZ are more viable than animals lacking YAP expression. In contrast, silencing of YAP contributed to a more dramatic effect on cell expansion, glucose uptake, and cell cycle arrest than TAZ. When assayed in non-small-cell lung cancer (NSCLC) cell lines, WWTR1 maintained the extracellular matrix (ECM) organization and adhesion, and controlled migration more than YAP, which more closely regulated cell division and cell cycle progression genes.

== Protein interactions ==
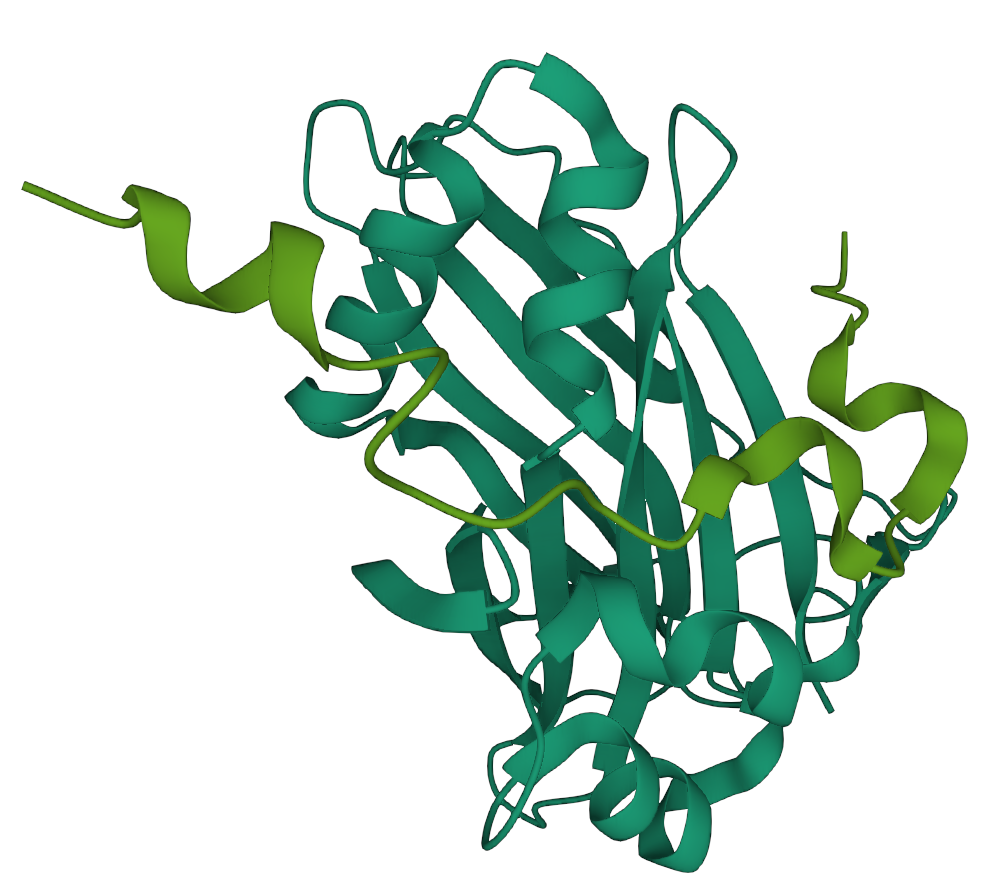
Binding of WWTR1 (TAZ) to transcription factors, such as TEAD, activates proliferative transcription.

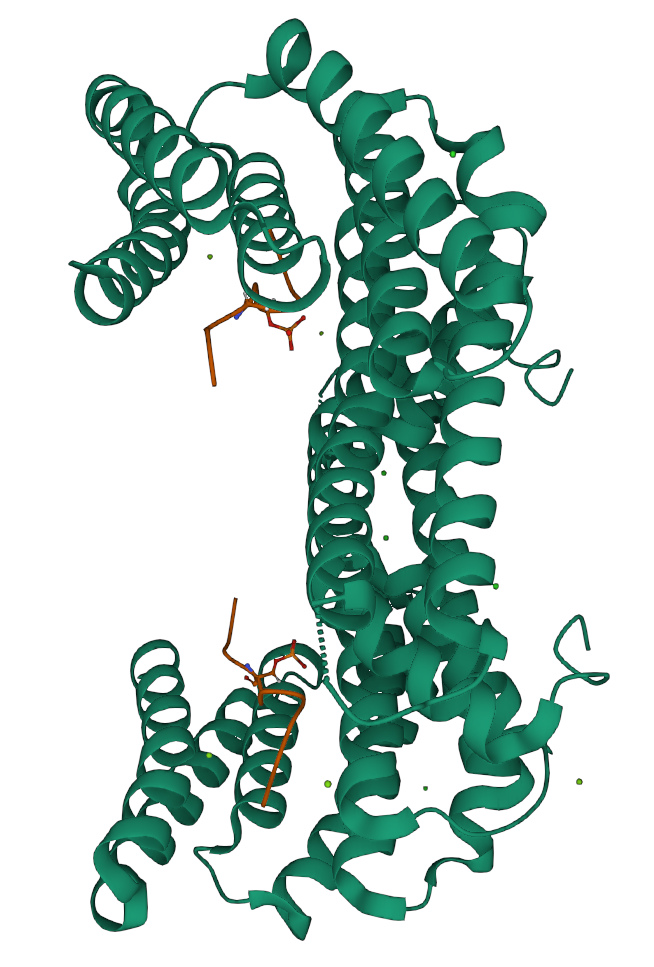
WWTR1 (TAZ) function is inhibited when in complex with 14-3-3 binding protein.

Protein Interaction Partner	Functional Effects
AMOT, Angiomotin	Binding sequesters YAP/TAZ in the cytoplasm, inhibiting their function
AP-1, Activator protein 1	Promoting trancsription
ASPP2, Apoptosis-stimulating protein of p53	Promotes dephosphorylation and stabilization of WWTR1 (TAZ)
β-catenin	Recruits a destruction complex that inactivates YAP/TAZ
LATS1/LATS2, Large tumor suppressor kinases	Phosphorylation of WWTR1, marking it for ubiquination
NFATC5, Nuclear factor of activated T-cells 5	Represses transcription in renal cells undergoing osmotic stress
PF, Parafibromin	Stimulates WWTR1 (TAZ) function
PAX3, Paired box gene 3	Promoting transcription
PAX8 (Paired box gene 8) and NKX2-4 (NK homeobox)	Coactivation of transcription factors involved in thyroid regulation
PRRG4, Proline Rich And Gla Domain 4	Suppressing transcription
RUNX1/2, Runt related transcription factors	Promotes transcription
SMAD2/3/4, Mothers against decapentaplegic family transcription factors	Nuclear shuttling; promoting transcription
STAT1, Signal transducer and activator of transcription	Inhibiting STAT1/2 dimerization in metabolism
TEAD1, TEA domain family member	Transcriptional activation
TEAD2, TEA domain family member,	Transcriptional activation
TEAD3, TEA domain family member,	Transcriptional activation
TEAD4, TEA domain family member	Transcriptional activation
YAP1, Yes-associated protein 1	Dimerization dependent transcriptional regulation
YWHAE (14-3-3), Tyrosine 3-Monooxygenase/Tryptophan 5-Monooxygenase Activation Protein Epsilon	Restricts WWTR1 translocation to the nucleus
ZO-2, Tight junction protein 2	Localizes YAP/TAZ to the nucleus for increased activity

== Clinical significance ==
=== Roles in disease ===
WWTR1 has been implicated in many inflammatory diseases, including cancers.

Disease	Clinical Significance of WWTR1
Cancer	Associated with metastasis and poor survival prognosis across many cancer types
Steatohepatitis	Overexpression of WWTR1 progresses simple steatosis to steatohepatitis by promoting fibrosis
Atherosclerosis	Drives excessive endothelial cell proliferation and inflammation
Sjogren Syndrome	Decreased WWTR1 localization to the nucleus results in lack of functional salivary/lacrimal gland development
Hypertension	Activation of YAP/TAZ promotes glutamine metabolism and increases pulmonary blood pressure
Psoriasis	YAP/TAZ activation drive pathologic angiogenesis and inflammation associated with chronic skin disorders
Atopic Dermatitis	YAP/TAZ activation drive pathologic angiogenesis and inflammation associated with chronic skin disorders
Rosacea	YAP/TAZ activation drive pathologic angiogenesis and inflammation associated with chronic skin disorders
Chronic Urticaria	YAP/TAZ activation drive pathologic angiogenesis and inflammation associated with chronic skin disorders

==== Cancers ====
WWTR1 (TAZ) is implicated a wide variety of cancers including melanoma, head and neck squamous cell carcinoma, breast cancer, non-small cell lung cancer, and others due to its high gene and histological expression, as well as correlation with increased metastasis and poorer survival in animal studies and patient data. Along with the structurally similar co-regulator YAP, many studies have described their role in promoting oncogenesis, altering neoplastic metabolism, and generating resistance to therapeutic intervention. In particular, TAZ overexpression conferred resistance to cisplatin chemotherapy as well as immunotherapy treatment with a PD-1 antibody.

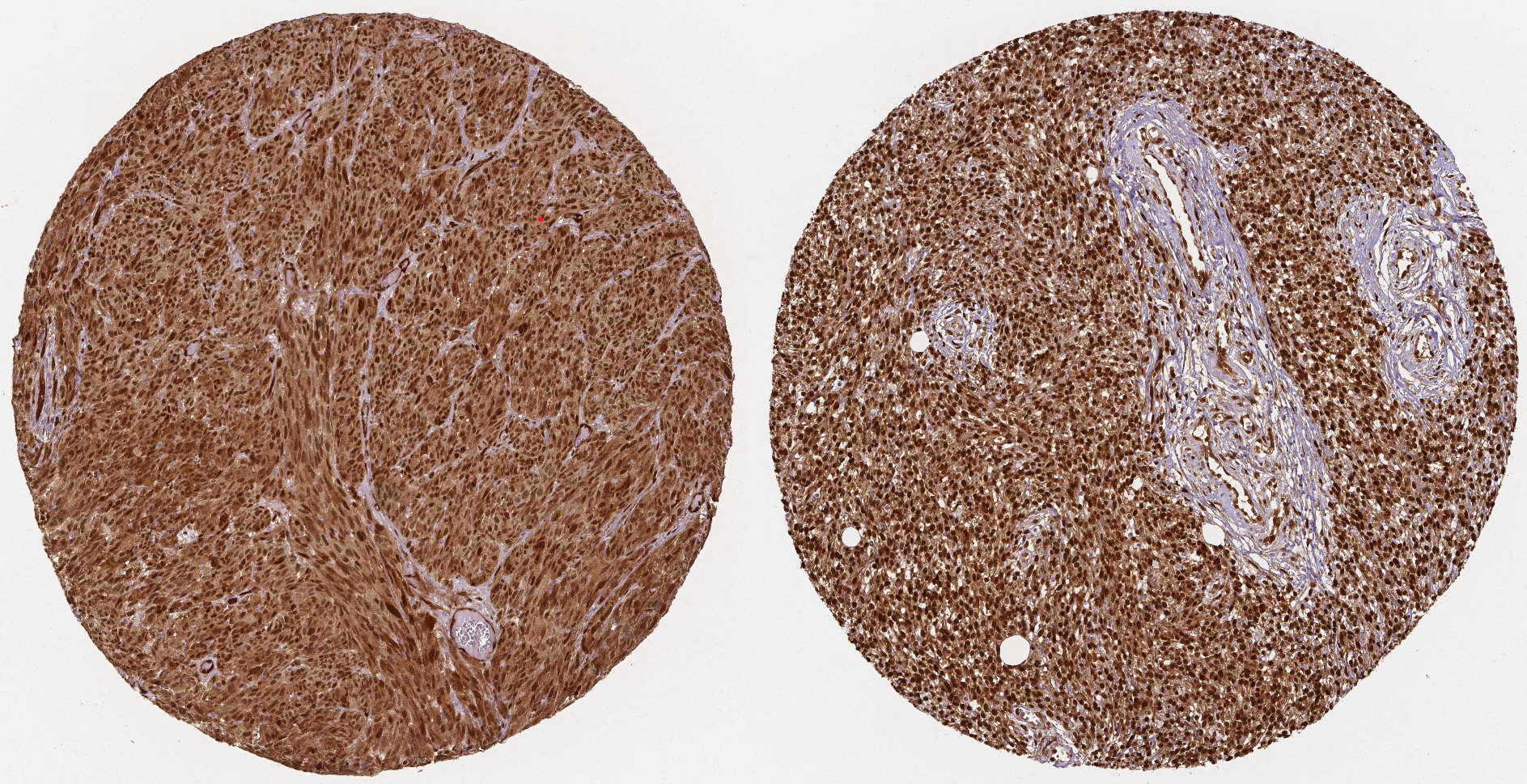
Medium intensity WWTR1 protein expression in melanoma samples from Protein Atlas.

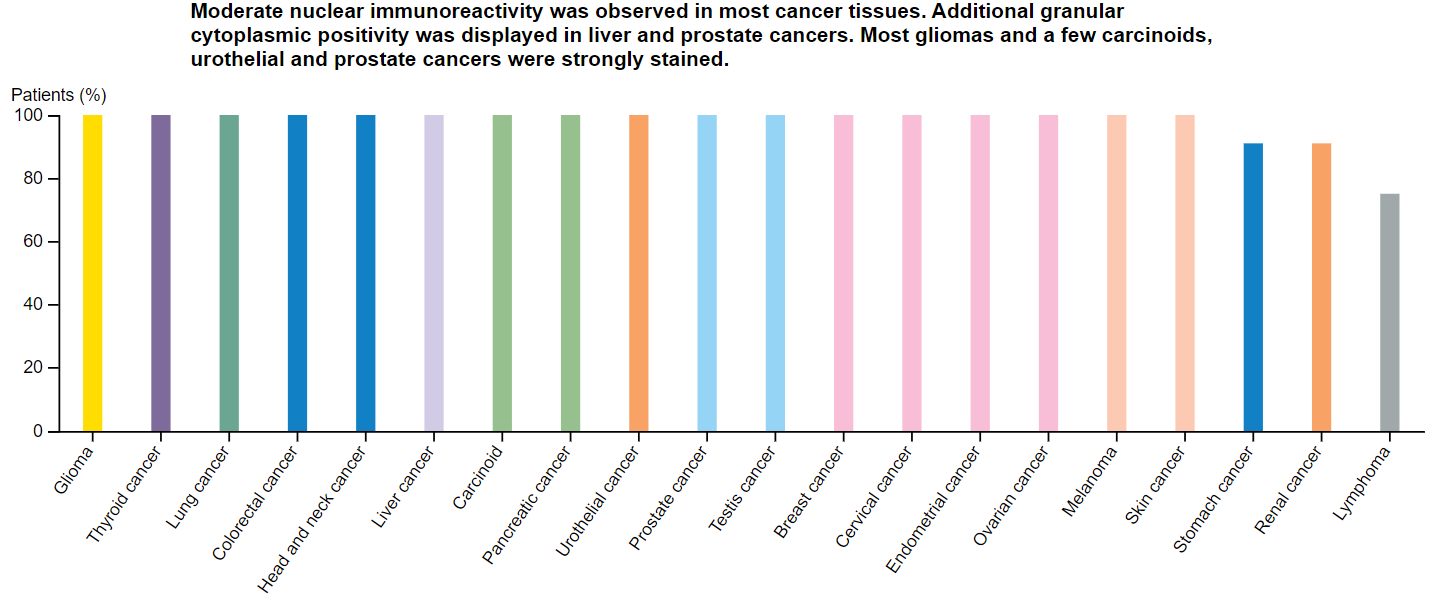
WWTR1 protein is expressed in moderate to high levels across a diverse array of cancer types and is associated with poor clinical outcomes.
WWTR1 Protein Expression By Cancer Type (from Protein Atlas)
Cancer Type	# Samples with Medium/High Expression	Total # Patient Samples	% Patient Samples with Medium/High Expression
Glioma	11	11	100%
Thyroid	4	4	100%
Lung	12	12	100%
Colorectal	11	11	100%
Head and Neck	4	4	100%
Liver	12	12	100%
Carcinoid	4	4	100%
Pancreatic	9	9	100%
Urothelial	9	9	100%
Prostate	10	10	100%
Testis	11	11	100%
Breast	12	12	100%
Cervical	9	9	100%
Endometrial	10	10	100%
Ovarian	11	11	100%
Melanoma	12	12	100%
Skin	11	11	100%
Stomach	10	11	90.1%
Renal	10	11	90.1%
Lymphoma	9	12	75%

=== As a drug target ===
YAP and TAZ function have been targeted in several therapeutic methods in the treatment of cancers.

The Hippo signaling agonist, C19, increases the phosphorylation of MST1/2 and LATS1/2, resulting in more downstream inactivation of YAP/TAZ. Modulating extracellular matrix stiffness and tension using thiazovivin, cucurbitacin I, dasatinib, fluvastatin, and pazopanib, exhibited positive results in breast cancer cell lines by preventing YAP/WWTR1 translocation to the nucleus. Endogenous hormonal factors that are synthesized for normal physiological functions such as epinephrine and glucagon have also been demonstrated to have similar inhibitory effects on YAP/TAZ function by promoting Hippo pathway activation. The class of cholesterol inhibitors, statins, was shown to inhibit the Rho family of GTP-ases (Rho-GTPase), which are enzymes that signal for upstream inhibition of the Hippo pathway, and exhibited similar effects in attenuating growth of breast cancer and human lung adenocarcinoma cells. Statins inhibit 3-hydroxy-3-methyl-glutaryl-coenzyme A reductase (HMG-CoA reductase), which is the precursor to mevalonate in the mevalonate pathway that synthesizes the lipid building blocks that form cholesterols and the lipid chains responsible for anchoring Rho-GTPases to the cell membrane. The Rho-GTPase, Ras Family Homolog A (RhoA), is activated by prenlylation (the posttranslational modification through addition of hydrophobic groups), and is responsible in part for modulating cytoskeletal elements that reduce Hippo pathway activity. By targeting Rho kinases with thiazovivin, or lipid synthesis through the mevalonate pathway, with statins, RhoA is inhibited and increased Hippo kinase activity may limit proliferation driven by YAP/TAZ. Tyrosine kinases signal in proliferative pathways, some which promote YAP/TAZ function, such as Src family kinases and includes the Yes tyrosine kinase, which is associated with YAP function. Targeting tyrosine kinases with inhibitors such as dasatinib and pazopanib has shown some effect in cancers.

Inhibition of YAP/TAZ function by targeting their interactions with their transcriptional partners in the TEAD family has also been studied. This includes the use of verteporfin, which was investigated in the treatment of skin cancers, particularly melanoma, although it was not taken beyond preclinical studies.

Drug/Molecule Name	Drug Class	Mechanism of Action
C19	Hippo kinase agonist	Increases phosphorylation by MST1/2 and LATS1/2 to inactivate YAP/TAZ and decrease cell proliferation
Dihydrexidine	Dopamine agonist	Increases LATS1/2 activity; Decreases YAP/TAZ function and cell proliferation
Epinephrine	Hormonal factor	Increases LATS1/2 activity; Decreases YAP/TAZ function and cell proliferation
Glucagon	Hormonal factor	Increases LATS1/2 activity; Decreases YAP/TAZ function and cell proliferation
Thiazovivin	Rho kinase inhibitor	Inhibits Rho-GTPase; Increases LATS1/2 activity; Decreases YAP/TAZ function and cell proliferation
Cucurbitacin I	JAK/STAT3 inhibitor	Inhibits Rho-GTPase; Increases LATS1/2 activity; Decreases YAP/TAZ function and cell proliferation
Dasatinib	Tyrosine kinase inhibitor	Inhibits Rho-GTPase; Increases LATS1/2 activity; Decreases YAP/TAZ function and cell proliferation
Fluvastatin	Statin	Inhibits Rho-GTPase; Increases LATS1/2 activity; Decreases YAP/TAZ function and cell proliferation
Pazopanib	Tyrosine kinase inhibitor	Inhibits Rho-GTPase; Increases LATS1/2 activity; Decreases YAP/TAZ function and cell proliferation
Verteporfin	TEAD inhibitor	Inhibits the binding of YAP/TAZ to TEAD family transcription factors; Decreases proliferative transcription and cell proliferation
