= IAG933 =

Chemical compound

Identifiers
- IUPAC name: 4-[(2S)-5-chloro-6-fluoro-2-phenyl-2-[(2S)-pyrrolidin-2-yl]-3H-1-benzofuran-4-yl]-5-fluoro-6-(2-hydroxyethoxy)-N-methylpyridine-3-carboxamide
- CAS Number: 2714434-21-4
- PubChem CID: 156855755
- IUPHAR/BPS: 13367
- ChemSpider: 129424100
- PDB ligand: WCF (PDBe, RCSB PDB)

Chemical and physical data
- Formula: C_{27}H_{26}ClF_{2}N_{3}O_{4}
- Molar mass: 529.97 g·mol^{−1}
- 3D model (JSmol): Interactive image
- SMILES: CNC(=O)C1=CN=C(C(=C1C2=C3C[C@@](OC3=CC(=C2Cl)F)([C@@H]4CCCN4)C5=CC=CC=C5)F)OCCO
- InChI: InChI=InChI=1S/C27H26ClF2N3O4/c1-31-25(35)17-14-33-26(36-11-10-34)24(30)22(17)21-16-13-27(20-8-5-9-32-20,15-6-3-2-4-7-15)37-19(16)12-18(29)23(21)28/h2-4,6-7,12,14,20,32,34H,5,8-11,13H2,1H3,(H,31,35)/t20-,27-/m0/s1; Key:HUVOYQMXUNTUAI-DCFHFQCYSA-N

IAG933 is an investigational new drug that is being evaluated for the treatment of cancer.

IAG933 is a small molecule inhibitor developed by Novartis Pharmaceuticals to directly disrupt the YAP/TAZ-TEAD protein-protein interaction, a critical mediator of oncogenic signaling in the Hippo pathway. This drug has demonstrated potent and selective inhibition of all four TEAD paralogs, resulting in YAP eviction from chromatin and reduced Hippo-mediated transcription. As of 2024, IAG933 is undergoing Phase I clinical trials to evaluate its safety, tolerability, and preliminary anti-tumor activity in patients with advanced mesothelioma and other solid tumors harboring specific molecular alterations in the Hippo pathway.

As of October 2025, Novartis indicated enrollment in the phase 1 clinical trial had been halted due to lack of efficacy.
