= STK3 =

Protein-coding gene in the species Homo sapiens

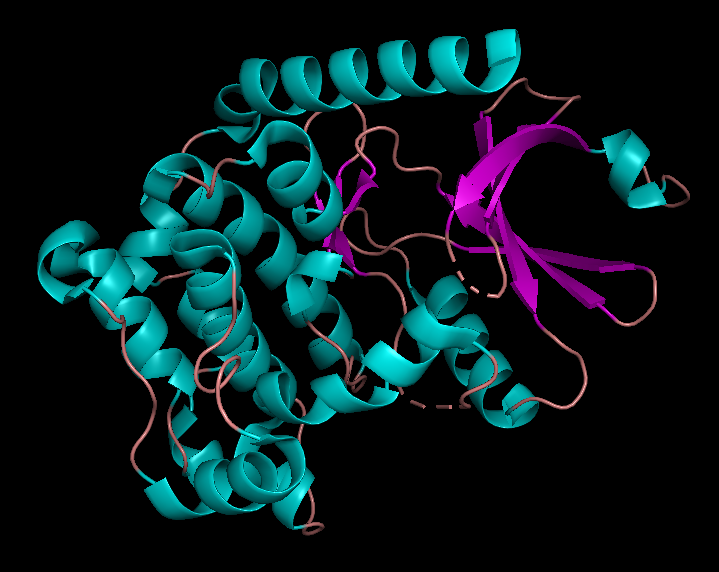
- Ribbon structure of human serine/threonine-protein kinase 3 kinase domain

Identifiers
- Aliases: STK3, KRS1, MST2, serine/threonine kinase 3
- External IDs: OMIM: 605030; MGI: 1928487; GeneCards: STK3
Available structures
PDB	Ortholog search: PDBe RCSB
PDB	List of PDB id codes 3WWS, 4HKD, 4L0N, 4LG4, 4LGD, 4OH9, 5BRM
Enzyme activity
EC #	BRENDA	ExPASy	KEGG	MetaCyc
2.7.11.1	↗	↗	↗	↗

Gene location (Human)
Chr.	Chromosome 8 (human)
Band	8q22.2	Start	98,371,228 bp
Band	8q22.2	End	98,942,827 bp

Gene location (Mouse)
Chr.	Chromosome 15 (mouse)
Band	15|15 B3.1	Start	34,875,642 bp
Band	15|15 B3.1	End	35,179,067 bp
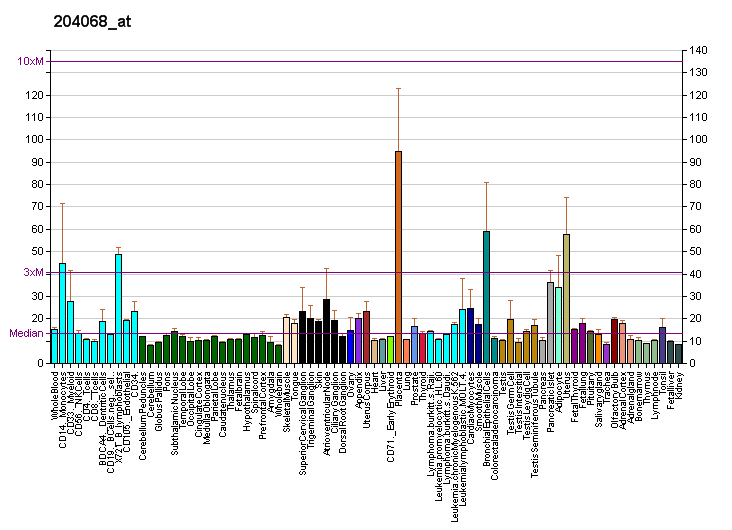

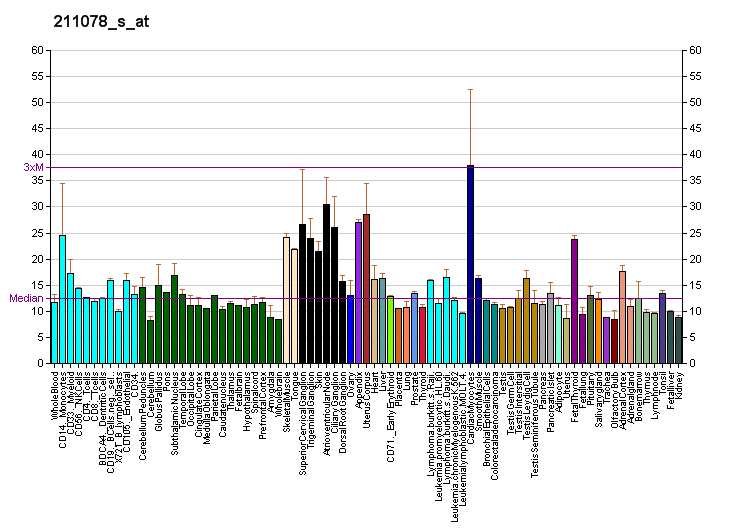
RNA expression pattern
Bgee	Human / Mouse (ortholog); Top expressed in: Achilles tendon; tail of epididymis; caput epididymis; germinal epithelium; placenta; sural nerve; optic nerve; corpus epididymis; seminal vesicula; cartilage tissue / Top expressed in: tail of embryo; dermis; pineal gland; Gonadal ridge; cumulus cell; blood; left lung lobe; zygote; abdominal wall; atrioventricular valve; More reference expression data
BioGPS	More reference expression data
Gene ontology
Molecular function	transferase activity; nucleotide binding; protein dimerization activity; protein serine/threonine kinase activator activity; metal ion binding; kinase activity; protein serine/threonine kinase activity; protein binding; ATP binding; magnesium ion binding; protein kinase activity; identical protein binding
Cellular component	cytoplasm; cytosol; nucleus; protein-containing complex
Biological process	regulation of cell differentiation involved in embryonic placenta development; positive regulation of extrinsic apoptotic signaling pathway via death domain receptors; positive regulation of protein kinase B signaling; intracellular signal transduction; phosphorylation; protein stabilization; positive regulation of DNA-binding transcription factor activity; positive regulation of JNK cascade; hippo signaling; endocardium development; protein phosphorylation; primitive hemopoiesis; central nervous system development; positive regulation of apoptotic process; positive regulation of protein binding; cell differentiation involved in embryonic placenta development; positive regulation of fat cell differentiation; negative regulation of organ growth; neural tube formation; negative regulation of canonical Wnt signaling pathway; signal transduction; negative regulation of cell population proliferation; hepatocyte apoptotic process; apoptotic process; positive regulation of protein serine/threonine kinase activity; regulation of mitotic cell cycle; stress-activated protein kinase signaling cascade; regulation of apoptotic process; activation of protein kinase activity
Sources:Amigo / QuickGO
Orthologs
Databases	NCBI: entry; OMA: entry
Species	Human	Mouse
Entrez	6788	56274
Ensembl	ENSG00000104375	ENSMUSG00000022329
UniProt	Q13188	Q9JI10
RefSeq (mRNA)	NM_001256312; NM_001256313; NM_006281	NM_019635; NM_001357821
RefSeq (protein)	NP_001243241; NP_001243242; NP_006272	NP_062609; NP_001344750
Location (UCSC)	Chr 8: 98.37 – 98.94 Mb	Chr 15: 34.88 – 35.18 Mb
PubMed search
- Wikidata
View/Edit Human	View/Edit Mouse

Serine/threonine-protein kinase 3 is an enzyme that in humans is encoded by the STK3 gene.

== Background ==
Protein kinase activation is a frequent response of cells to treatment with growth factors, chemicals, heat shock, or apoptosis-inducing agents. This protein kinase activation presumably allows cells to resist unfavorable environmental conditions. The yeast 'sterile 20' (Ste20) kinase acts upstream of the mitogen-activated protein kinase (MAPK) cascade that is activated under a variety of stress conditions. MST2 was first identified as a kinase that resembles budding yeast Ste20 (Creasy and Chernoff, 1996) and later as a kinase that is activated by the proapoptotic agents straurosporine and FAS ligand (MIM 134638) (Taylor et al., 1996; Lee et al., 2001).[supplied by OMIM]

== Structure ==
Human serine/threonine-protein kinase 3 (STK3, or MST2) is a 56,301 Da monomer with three domains: a SARAH domain, composed of a long α-helix at the C-terminus that when dimerized, forms an antiparallel dimeric coiled-coil, an inhibitory domain, and a catalytic kinase domain at the N-terminus. The SARAH (Salvador/RASSF/Hpo) domain has been found to mediate dimeric interactions between MST2 and RASSF enzymes, a class of tumor suppressors that serve an important role in activating apoptosis, as well as between MST2 and SAV1, a non-catalytic polypeptide responsible for bringing MST2 to an apoptotic pathway. When the MST2 kinase domain is in its active state, a threonine residue residing on an alpha helix at the 180th position (T180) is autophosphorylated.

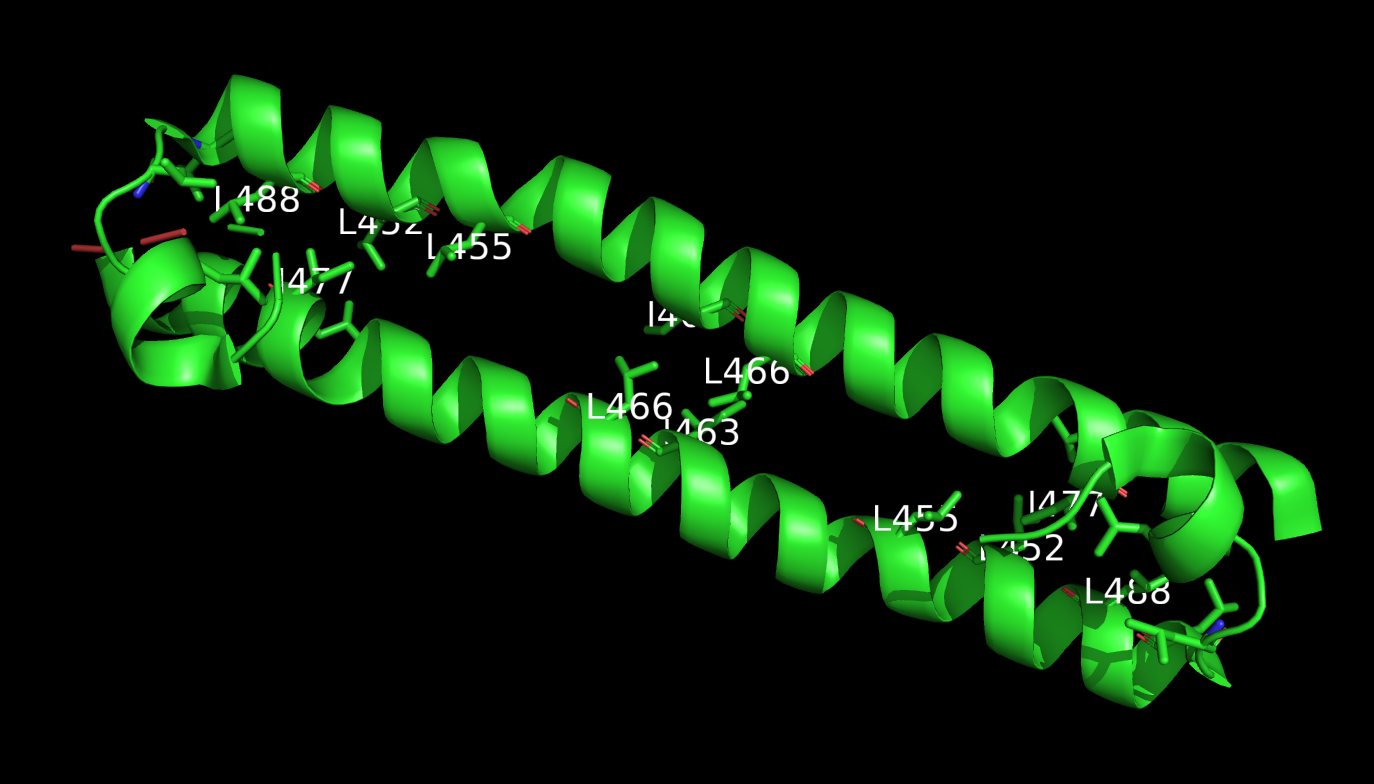
Dimerized MST2 SARAH domains with labeled hydrophobic residues

== Mechanism ==
=== Activation ===
STK3 is activated through autophosphorylation by dimerizing with itself or heterodimerizing with its homolog, MST1 (STK4). Heterodimerization has been shown to exhibit a roughly six-fold weaker binding affinity than homodimerization with MST2, as well as lower kinase activity compared to both MST2/MST2 and MST1/MST1 homodimers. In addition to activation by straurosporine and FAS ligand, STK3 has been found to be activated through dissociation of GLRX and Thioredoxin (Trx1) from STK3 under oxidative stress. Recent studies have shown that when caspase 3 is activated during apoptosis, MST2 is cleaved, resulting in removal of the regulatory SARAH and inhibitory domains and thus regulation of MST2's kinase activity. Because cleavage by caspase 3 also cleaves off MST2's nuclear export signal, the MST2 kinase fragment can diffuse into the nucleus and phosphorylate Ser14 of histone H2B, promoting apoptosis.

=== Inactivation ===
Inactivation of MST2 can be accomplished through inhibition of MST2 homodimerization and autophosphorylation by c-Raf, which binds to the MST2 SARAH domain.

=== MST2 substrates ===
In the mammalian Hippo signaling pathway, MST2, along with its homolog MST1, serves as an upstream kinase whose catalytic activity is responsible for downstream events leading to downregulation of proliferation-associated genes and increased transcription of proapoptotic genes. When MST2 binds to SAV1 through its SARAH domain, MST2 phosphorylates LATS1/LATS2 with the help of SAV1, MOB1A/MOB1B, and Merlin (protein). In turn, LATS1/LATS2 phosphorylates and inhibits YAP1, preventing its movement into the nucleus and activation of transcription of pro-proliferative, anti-apoptotic and migration-associated genes. In the cytoplasm, YAP1 is marked for degradation by the SCF complex. Additionally, MST2 phosphorylates transcription factors in the FOXO (Forkhead box O) family, which diffuse into the nucleus and activate transcription of pro-apoptotic genes.

== Disease Relevance ==
In many types of cancers, the proto-oncogene c-Raf binds to the SARAH domain of MST2 and prevents RASSF1A-mediated MST2 dimerization and subsequent downstream pro-apoptotic signaling. Research has shown that in cells with loss of PTEN (gene), a tumor suppressor that is frequently mutated in cancers, Akt activity is upregulated, resulting in increased MST2 inactivation and undesirable cell proliferation.
