= FAT1 =

Protein-coding gene in the species Homo sapiens

Identifiers
- Aliases: FAT1, CDHF7, CDHR8, FAT, ME5, hFat1, FAT atypical cadherin 1
- External IDs: OMIM: 600976; MGI: 109168; GeneCards: FAT1

Gene location (Human)
Chr.	Chromosome 4 (human)
Band	4q35.2	Start	186,587,794 bp
Band	4q35.2	End	186,726,722 bp

Gene location (Mouse)
Chr.	Chromosome 8 (mouse)
Band	8 B1.1|8 24.81 cM	Start	45,388,484 bp
Band	8 B1.1|8 24.81 cM	End	45,505,294 bp
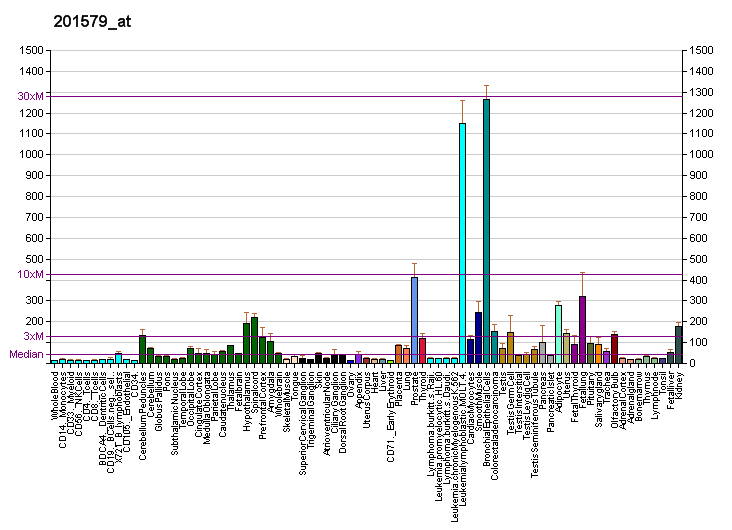
RNA expression pattern
Bgee	Human / Mouse (ortholog); Top expressed in: Epithelium of choroid plexus; tibia; metanephric glomerulus; periodontal fiber; ventricular zone; cartilage tissue; stromal cell of endometrium; jejunal mucosa; mucosa of colon; mucosa of sigmoid colon / Top expressed in: hand; ciliary body; stroma of bone marrow; iris; molar; cumulus cell; medullary collecting duct; calvaria; renal corpuscle; conjunctival fornix; More reference expression data
BioGPS	More reference expression data
Gene ontology
Molecular function	calcium ion binding; protein binding
Cellular component	cytoplasm; integral component of membrane; membrane; cell-cell junction; focal adhesion; filopodium; plasma membrane; integral component of plasma membrane; cell junction; perinuclear region of cytoplasm; extracellular exosome; nucleus; lamellipodium; apical plasma membrane
Biological process	actin filament organization; cell-cell signaling; anatomical structure morphogenesis; establishment or maintenance of cell polarity; cell adhesion; cell migration; homophilic cell adhesion via plasma membrane adhesion molecules; cell-cell adhesion; epithelial cell morphogenesis; establishment or maintenance of epithelial cell apical/basal polarity; camera-type eye morphogenesis
Sources:Amigo / QuickGO
Orthologs
Databases	NCBI: entry; OMA: entry
Species	Human	Mouse
Entrez	2195	14107
Ensembl	ENSG00000083857	ENSMUSG00000070047
UniProt	Q14517	n/a
RefSeq (mRNA)	NM_005245	NM_001081286; NM_010179
RefSeq (protein)	NP_005236	n/a
Location (UCSC)	Chr 4: 186.59 – 186.73 Mb	Chr 8: 45.39 – 45.51 Mb
PubMed search
- Wikidata
View/Edit Human	View/Edit Mouse

Protocadherin FAT1 is a protein that in humans is encoded by the FAT1 gene.

== Function ==
This gene is an ortholog of the Drosophila fat gene, which encodes a tumor suppressor essential for controlling cell proliferation during Drosophila development. The gene product is a member of the cadherin superfamily, a group of integral membrane proteins characterized by the presence of cadherin-type repeats. This gene is expressed at high levels in a number of fetal epithelia. Transcript variants derived from alternative splicing and/or alternative promoter usage exist, but they have not been fully described.

The murine Fat1 knockout mouse is not embryonically lethal but pups die within 48-hours due to the abnormal fusion of podocyte foot processes within the kidney. These Fat1 knockout mice also showed partially penetrant but often severe midline defects including holoprosencephaly, microphthalmia-anophthalmia and in rare cases cyclopia.

It has been shown that the EVH motifs in the cytoplasmic tail of mouse Fat1 interact with Ena/VASP and ablation of Fat1 by RNAi leads to decreased cell migration of rat epithelial cells

The cytoplasmic tail of Fat1 has also been shown to bind the transcriptional repressor Atrophin in rat vascular smooth muscle cells

At the carboxyl terminus of FAT1 lies a PDZ domain (PSD95/Dlg1/ZO-1) ligand motif (-HTEV). Zebrafish Fat1 was found to bind the protein scribble and regulate Hippo signalling

Using the human SHSY5Y cell line as a model of neuronal differentiation, human FAT1 was shown to regulate Hippo kinase components with loss of FAT1 leading to nucleocytoplasmic relocation of TAZ and enhanced transcription of the Hippo target gene CTGF. The same study also showed FAT1 was able to regulate TGF-beta signaling

FAT1 has been found to bind beta-catenin and regulate Wnt-signaling in colorectal cancer.

Human FAT1 was found to bind glypican-3 (GPC3) and regulate cell migration in liver cancer cells.

== Structure ==
The human FAT1 cadherin gene was cloned in 1995 from a human T-leukemia (T-ALL) cell line and consists of 27 exons located on chromosome 4q34–35. Structurally the FAT1 protein is a single pass transmembrane protein with the extracellular portion consisting of 34 cadherin repeats, 5 EGF-like domains and a laminin-G like domain.

The FAT1 protein once translated undergoes furin mediated S1 cleavage forming a non-covalent heterodimer before achieving cell surface expression although this processing is often perturbed in cancer cells which express non-cleaved FAT1 on the cell surface.

FAT1 cadherin is multiply phosphorylated on its ectodomain but phosphorylation is not catalysed by FJX1. The ectodomain of FAT1 can also be shed from the cell surface by the sheddase ADAM10, with release of this ectodomain a possible new biomarker in pancreatic cancer.

FAT1 has also been found to undergo alternative splicing in breast cancer cells undergoing epithelial-to-mesenchymal (EMT) transition with the addition of 12 amino acids in the cytoplasmic tail. Similar splice variants have also been described for murine Fat1 where alternative splicing of the cytoplasmic tail regulated cell migration.

== Clinical significance ==
=== Cancer ===
The FAT1 cadherin has been ascribed both as putative tumour suppressor or oncogene in different contexts. Loss of heterozygosity for FAT1 has been reported in primary oral carcinomas and astrocytic tumours. There are also reports of over expression of FAT1 in different cancers including DCIS breast cancer, melanoma, and leukaemia.
