= Lymphedema-posterior choanal atresia syndrome =

- Specialty: Medical genetics
- Deaths: 1

Lymphedema-posterior choanal atresia syndrome is a rare genetic disorder characterized by the early-onset appearance of lymphedemas and congenital choanal atresia, which might be accompanied by other features such as pectus excavatum, hypoplasia of the nipples, and facial dysmorphisms such as hypertelorism, frontal bossing, etc. Only 7 cases from Yemen and Iran have been described in the medical literature. This condition is caused by homozygous mutations in the PTPN14 gene, located in chromosome 1.

== History ==
The first patients of this condition ever were described in 1982, they were two siblings of the opposite sex and their paternal aunt belonging to a Yemenite family which practiced cousin marriages. In addition to the characteristic symptoms of this condition, the boy and the aunt, in particular, had symptoms unique to their cases; the boy had a high-arched palate, underdeveloped nipples, and mild pectus excavatum, and the aunt had a high-arched palate only aside from her other symptoms. A follow-up study done 9 years later in 1991 revealed that the sister had died, and the surviving boy and aunt started developing lymphedema in their lower extremities, it also found 3 other affected members of the family.

In 2017, a girl born of consanguineous Iranian parents was described in medical literature. Aside from the characteristic findings of the condition, she was found to have intrauterine growth restriction, severe respiratory distress, transient hypothyroidism (which resolved by age 1 year old), and small ventricular septal defect. Dysmorphic findings included small nipples, frontal bossing, smooth philtrum, hypertelorism, unilateral low-set ear, and high-arched palate. She developed low extremity lymphedema in infancy, and had mild developmental delays which were thought to have been caused by the surgeries and prolonged NICU stay she had to go through.
