= MOB kinase activator 1B =

Protein found in humans

MOB1B
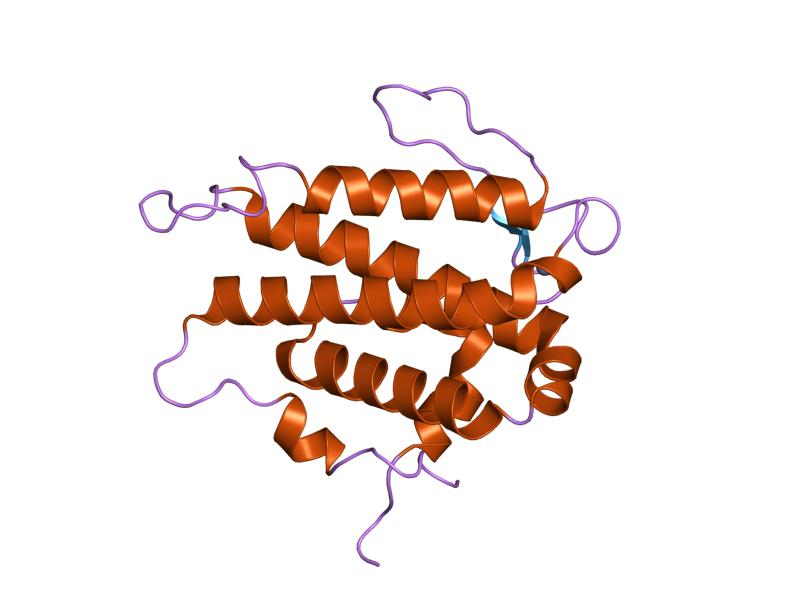

Identifiers
- Aliases: MOB1B, MATS2, MOB4A, MOBKL1A, MOB kinase activator 1B
- External IDs: OMIM: 609282; MGI: 1915723; GeneCards: MOB1B

Gene location (Human)
Chr.	Chromosome 4 (human)
Band	4q13.3	Start	70,902,326 bp
Band	4q13.3	End	71,022,449 bp

Gene location (Mouse)
Chr.	Chromosome 5 (mouse)
Band	5|5 E1	Start	88,868,714 bp
Band	5|5 E1	End	88,912,079 bp
RNA expression pattern
Bgee	Human / Mouse (ortholog); Top expressed in: renal medulla; thymus; superior surface of tongue; saphenous vein; skin of arm; trabecular bone; medulla oblongata; trigeminal ganglion; superior vestibular nucleus; body of tongue / Top expressed in: superior surface of tongue; gallbladder; seminal vesicula; Epithelium of choroid plexus; left lobe of liver; aortic valve; ascending aorta; ciliary body; atrioventricular valve; epithelium of stomach; More reference expression data
BioGPS	n/a
Gene ontology
Molecular function	kinase binding; protein binding; kinase activator activity; metal ion binding
Cellular component	cytoplasm; extracellular exosome; nucleus; nucleolus; cytosol
Biological process	regulation of protein autophosphorylation; hippo signaling; positive regulation of phosphorylation; positive regulation of kinase activity
Sources:Amigo / QuickGO
Orthologs
Databases	NCBI: entry; OMA: entry
Species	Human	Mouse
Entrez	92597	68473
Ensembl	ENSG00000173542	ENSMUSG00000006262
UniProt	Q7L9L4	Q8BPB0
RefSeq (mRNA)	NM_001244766; NM_001244767; NM_173468	NM_026735
RefSeq (protein)	NP_001231695; NP_001231696; NP_775739	NP_081011
Location (UCSC)	Chr 4: 70.9 – 71.02 Mb	Chr 5: 88.87 – 88.91 Mb
PubMed search
- Wikidata
View/Edit Human	View/Edit Mouse

MOB kinase activator 1B, also known as Mob1 homolog 1A, is a protein that in humans is encoded by the MOB1B gene (previously MOBKL1A).

== Function ==
The protein encoded by this gene is similar to the yeast Mob1 protein. Yeast Mob1 binds Mps1p, a protein kinase essential for spindle pole body duplication and mitotic checkpoint regulation.

== See also ==
- Hippo signaling pathway
