= FAT atypical cadherin 3 =

Protein-coding gene in the species Homo sapiens

FAT3

Identifiers
- Aliases: FAT3, CDHF15, CDHR10, hFat3, FAT atypical cadherin 3
- External IDs: OMIM: 612483; MGI: 2444314; GeneCards: FAT3

Gene location (Human)
Chr.	Chromosome 11 (human)
Band	11q14.3	Start	92,224,818 bp
Band	11q14.3	End	92,896,473 bp

Gene location (Mouse)
Chr.	Chromosome 9 (mouse)
Band	9|9 A2	Start	15,821,485 bp
Band	9|9 A2	End	16,412,581 bp
RNA expression pattern
Bgee	Human / Mouse (ortholog); Top expressed in: buccal mucosa cell; Brodmann area 23; middle temporal gyrus; endothelial cell; external globus pallidus; tibia; parietal lobe; entorhinal cortex; lateral nuclear group of thalamus; postcentral gyrus / Top expressed in: habenula; olfactory tubercle; median eminence; vas deferens; body of femur; mammillary body; globus pallidus; substantia nigra; superior colliculus; lateral septal nucleus; More reference expression data
BioGPS	n/a
Gene ontology
Molecular function	calcium ion binding
Cellular component	integral component of membrane; plasma membrane; membrane
Biological process	homophilic cell adhesion via plasma membrane adhesion molecules; multicellular organism development; cell adhesion; cell-cell adhesion
Sources:Amigo / QuickGO
Orthologs
Databases	NCBI: entry; OMA: entry
Species	Human	Mouse
Entrez	120114	270120
Ensembl	ENSG00000165323	ENSMUSG00000074505
UniProt	Q8TDW7	Q8BNA6
RefSeq (mRNA)	NM_001008781; NM_001367949; NM_001378141	NM_001080814
RefSeq (protein)	NP_001008781; NP_001354878; NP_001365070	NP_001074283
Location (UCSC)	Chr 11: 92.22 – 92.9 Mb	Chr 9: 15.82 – 16.41 Mb
PubMed search
- Wikidata
View/Edit Human	View/Edit Mouse

FAT atypical cadherin 3 is a protein that in humans is encoded by the FAT3 gene.
