= PTPN14 =

Protein-coding gene in humans

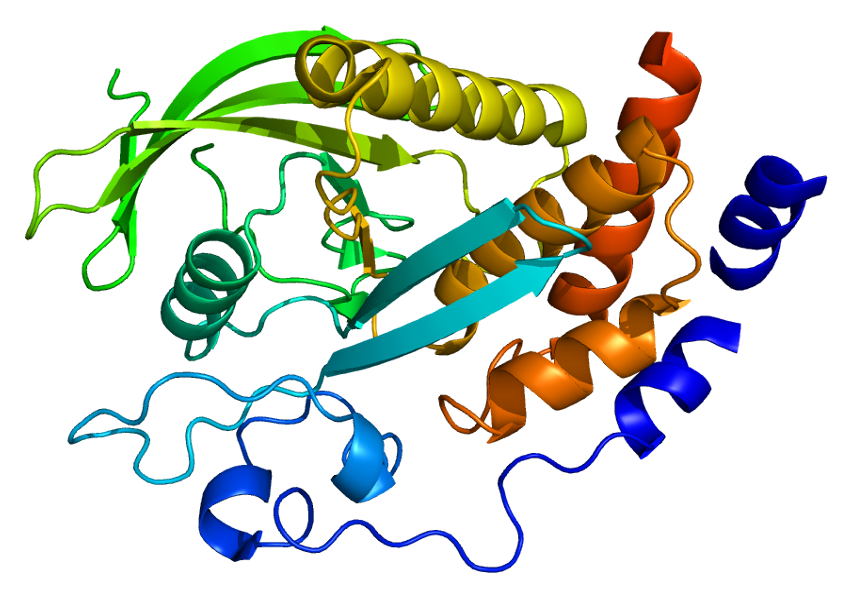

Identifiers
- Aliases: PTPN14, PEZ, PTP36, protein tyrosine phosphatase, non-receptor type 14, CATLPH, protein tyrosine phosphatase non-receptor type 14, PTPD2
- External IDs: OMIM: 603155; MGI: 102467; GeneCards: PTPN14
Available structures
PDB	Ortholog search: PDBe RCSB
PDB	List of PDB id codes 2BZL
Enzyme activity
EC #	BRENDA	ExPASy	KEGG	MetaCyc
3.1.3.48	↗	↗	↗	↗

Gene location (Human)
Chr.	Chromosome 1 (human)
Band	1q32.3-q41	Start	214,348,700 bp
Band	1q32.3-q41	End	214,552,449 bp

Gene location (Mouse)
Chr.	Chromosome 1 (mouse)
Band	1 H6|1 95.03 cM	Start	189,460,465 bp
Band	1 H6|1 95.03 cM	End	189,608,892 bp
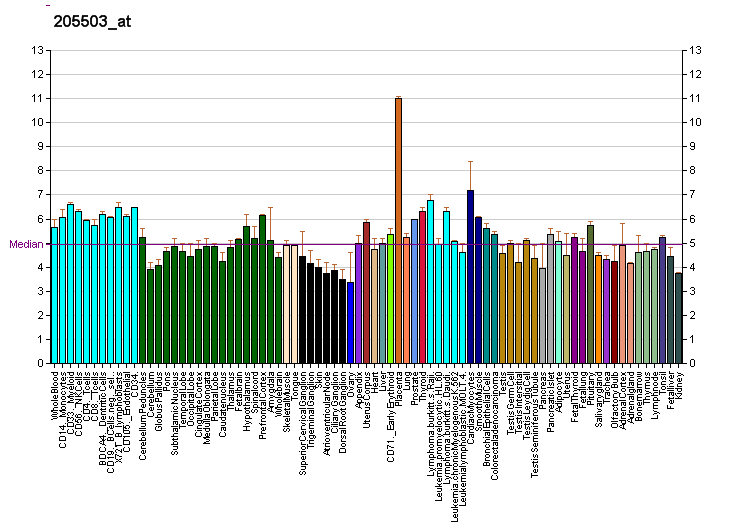
RNA expression pattern
Bgee	Human / Mouse (ortholog); Top expressed in: buccal mucosa cell; parietal pleura; tibia; skin of thigh; skin of hip; Skeletal muscle tissue of rectus abdominis; visceral pleura; Skeletal muscle tissue of biceps brachii; nipple; germinal epithelium / Top expressed in: endothelial cell of lymphatic vessel; tail of embryo; vestibular membrane of cochlear duct; skin of external ear; genital tubercle; epithelium of lens; condyle; stroma of bone marrow; lip; epidermis; More reference expression data
BioGPS	More reference expression data
Gene ontology
Molecular function	phosphoprotein phosphatase activity; hydrolase activity; phosphatase activity; receptor tyrosine kinase binding; transcription coregulator activity; protein binding; protein tyrosine phosphatase activity
Cellular component	nucleus; cytoplasm; cytoskeleton; nucleoplasm
Biological process	negative regulation of cell population proliferation; regulation of transcription, DNA-templated; protein dephosphorylation; regulation of protein export from nucleus; transcription, DNA-templated; dephosphorylation; lymphangiogenesis; peptidyl-tyrosine dephosphorylation; cellular response to cytokine stimulus; regulation of nucleic acid-templated transcription
Sources:Amigo / QuickGO
Orthologs
Databases	NCBI: entry; OMA: entry
Species	Human	Mouse
Entrez	5784	19250
Ensembl	ENSG00000152104	ENSMUSG00000026604
UniProt	Q15678	Q62130
RefSeq (mRNA)	NM_005401	NM_001033287; NM_008976
RefSeq (protein)	NP_005392	NP_033002
Location (UCSC)	Chr 1: 214.35 – 214.55 Mb	Chr 1: 189.46 – 189.61 Mb
PubMed search
- Wikidata
View/Edit Human	View/Edit Mouse

Tyrosine-protein phosphatase non-receptor type 14 is an enzyme that in humans is encoded by the PTPN14 gene. It is composes of a PTP (protein tyrosine phosphatase) domain and a FERM domain connected by a long linker.

== Function ==
The protein encoded by this gene is a member of the PTP family and PTPN14 subfamily of tyrosine protein phosphatases. PTPs are signalling molecules that regulate a variety of cellular processes including cell growth, differentiation, mitotic cycle, and oncogenic transformation. This PTP contains an N-terminal noncatalytic domain similar to that of band 4.1 superfamily cytoskeleton-associated proteins, which suggested the membrane or cytoskeleton localization of this protein. The enzymatic function of this PTP has not yet been determined. However, it is shown to participate as a tumor suppressor in the Hippo pathway.

== Interactions ==
PTPN14 has been shown to interact with the Yes-associated protein (YAP) and with Beta-catenin.
