= FRMD6 =

Protein-coding gene in the species Homo sapiens

Identifiers
- Aliases: FRMD6, C14orf31, EX1, Willin, c14_5320, FERM domain containing 6
- External IDs: OMIM: 614555; MGI: 2442579; GeneCards: FRMD6

Gene location (Human)
Chr.	Chromosome 14 (human)
Band	14q22.1	Start	51,489,100 bp
Band	14q22.1	End	51,730,727 bp

Gene location (Mouse)
Chr.	Chromosome 12 (mouse)
Band	12|12 C2	Start	70,872,288 bp
Band	12|12 C2	End	70,949,008 bp
RNA expression pattern
Bgee	Human / Mouse (ortholog); Top expressed in: skin of arm; cartilage tissue; tibia; tail of epididymis; stromal cell of endometrium; epithelium of lactiferous gland; lactiferous duct; oral cavity; skin of thigh; skin of hip / Top expressed in: calvaria; skin of external ear; hair follicle; ankle joint; body of femur; skin of back; corneal stroma; lip; conjunctival fornix; sciatic nerve; More reference expression data
BioGPS	n/a
Gene ontology
Molecular function	protein binding; structural constituent of cytoskeleton
Cellular component	apical junction complex; plasma membrane; membrane; cytoplasm; cytoskeleton
Biological process	regulation of actin filament-based process; apical constriction; actomyosin structure organization
Sources:Amigo / QuickGO
Orthologs
Databases	NCBI: entry; OMA: entry
Species	Human	Mouse
Entrez	122786	319710
Ensembl	ENSG00000139926	ENSMUSG00000048285
UniProt	Q96NE9	Q8C0V9
RefSeq (mRNA)	NM_001042481; NM_001267046; NM_001267047; NM_152330	NM_028127
RefSeq (protein)	NP_001035946; NP_001253975; NP_001253976; NP_689543	NP_082403
Location (UCSC)	Chr 14: 51.49 – 51.73 Mb	Chr 12: 70.87 – 70.95 Mb
PubMed search
- Wikidata
View/Edit Human	View/Edit Mouse

FERM domain-containing protein 6 is a protein that in humans is encoded by the FRMD6 gene.
