= LATS2 =

Protein-coding gene in the species Homo sapiens

Identifiers
- Aliases: LATS2, KPM, large tumor suppressor kinase 2
- External IDs: OMIM: 604861; MGI: 1354386; GeneCards: LATS2
Available structures
PDB	Ortholog search: PDBe RCSB
PDB	List of PDB id codes 4ZRI
Enzyme activity
EC #	BRENDA	ExPASy	KEGG	MetaCyc
2.7.11.1	↗	↗	↗	↗

Gene location (Human)
Chr.	Chromosome 13 (human)
Band	13q12.11	Start	20,973,036 bp
Band	13q12.11	End	21,061,586 bp

Gene location (Mouse)
Chr.	Chromosome 14 (mouse)
Band	14|14 C3	Start	57,927,119 bp
Band	14|14 C3	End	57,995,845 bp
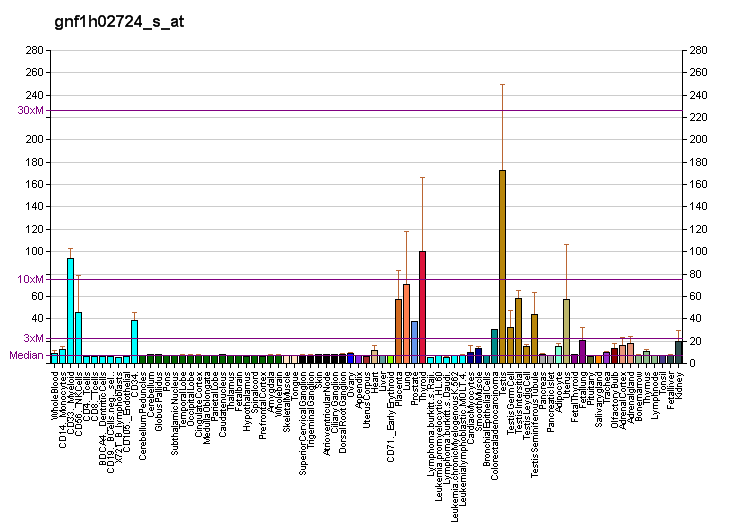
RNA expression pattern
Bgee	Human / Mouse (ortholog); Top expressed in: pancreatic epithelial cell; myocardium of left ventricle; visceral pleura; parietal pleura; tibialis anterior muscle; tibia; germinal epithelium; cardiac muscle tissue of right atrium; lower lobe of lung; amniotic fluid / Top expressed in: ascending aorta; aortic valve; external carotid artery; sciatic nerve; cardiac muscle tissue of left ventricle; internal carotid artery; spermatid; left lung lobe; plantaris muscle; carotid body; More reference expression data
BioGPS	More reference expression data
Gene ontology
Molecular function	transferase activity; nucleotide binding; protein kinase activity; metal ion binding; kinase activity; protein binding; ATP binding; protein serine/threonine kinase activity
Cellular component	spindle pole; microtubule organizing center; cytoskeleton; nucleus; cytoplasm; cytosol
Biological process	intracellular signal transduction; phosphorylation; negative regulation of cyclin-dependent protein serine/threonine kinase activity; cell division; protein phosphorylation; peptidyl-serine phosphorylation; hormone-mediated signaling pathway; positive regulation of apoptotic process; cell cycle; G1/S transition of mitotic cell cycle; hippo signaling; regulation of organ growth; negative regulation of canonical Wnt signaling pathway; inner cell mass cell fate commitment; inner cell mass cellular morphogenesis; keratinocyte differentiation
Sources:Amigo / QuickGO
Orthologs
Databases	NCBI: entry; OMA: entry
Species	Human	Mouse
Entrez	26524	50523
Ensembl	ENSG00000150457	ENSMUSG00000021959
UniProt	Q9NRM7	Q7TSJ6
RefSeq (mRNA)	NM_014572	NM_015771; NM_153382
RefSeq (protein)	NP_055387	NP_056586; NP_700431
Location (UCSC)	Chr 13: 20.97 – 21.06 Mb	Chr 14: 57.93 – 58 Mb
PubMed search
- Wikidata
View/Edit Human	View/Edit Mouse

Large tumor suppressor kinase 2 (LATS2) is an enzyme that in humans is encoded by the LATS2 gene.

This gene encodes a serine/threonine protein kinase belonging to the LATS tumor suppressor family and participates in the Hippo signaling pathway where it inactivates the effector proteins, YAP and WWTR1 (TAZ). The protein localizes to centrosomes during interphase and early and late metaphase. It interacts with the centrosomal proteins aurora-A and ajuba and is required for accumulation of gamma-tubulin and spindle formation at the onset of mitosis. It also interacts with a negative regulator of p53 and may function in a positive feedback loop with p53 that responds to cytoskeleton damage. Additionally, it can function as a corepressor of androgen-responsive gene expression.
