= LATS1 =

Protein-coding gene in the species Homo sapiens

Identifiers
- Aliases: LATS1, WARTS, wts, large tumor suppressor kinase 1
- External IDs: OMIM: 603473; MGI: 1333883; GeneCards: LATS1
Available structures
PDB	Ortholog search: PDBe RCSB
PDB	List of PDB id codes 4ZRK, 5BRK, 5B5W
Enzyme activity
EC #	BRENDA	ExPASy	KEGG	MetaCyc
2.7.11.1	↗	↗	↗	↗

Gene location (Human)
Chr.	Chromosome 6 (human)
Band	6q25.1	Start	149,658,153 bp
Band	6q25.1	End	149,718,105 bp

Gene location (Mouse)
Chr.	Chromosome 10 (mouse)
Band	10|10 A1	Start	7,556,978 bp
Band	10|10 A1	End	7,592,224 bp
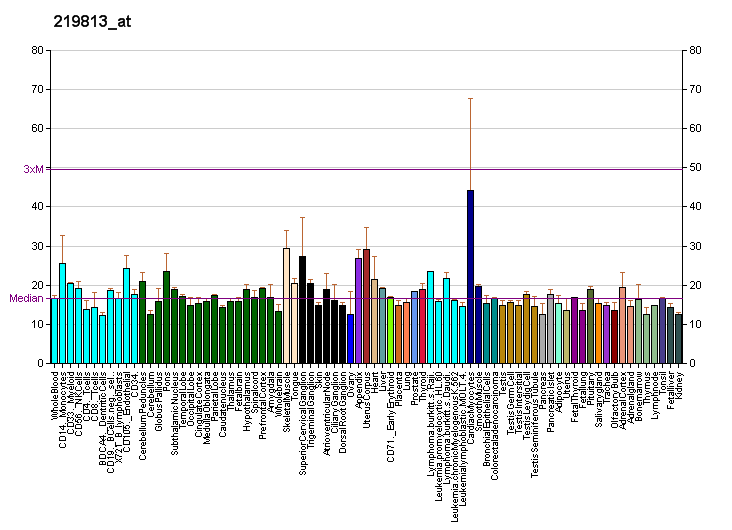
RNA expression pattern
Bgee	Human / Mouse (ortholog); Top expressed in: germinal epithelium; tibia; mucosa of paranasal sinus; gingival epithelium; epithelium of nasopharynx; parietal pleura; visceral pleura; seminal vesicula; retinal pigment epithelium; palpebral conjunctiva / Top expressed in: genital tubercle; tail of embryo; uterus; ganglionic eminence; ventricular zone; ovary; lens; jejunum; granulocyte; ileum; More reference expression data
BioGPS	More reference expression data
Gene ontology
Molecular function	nucleotide binding; protein binding; protein kinase binding; protein kinase activity; kinase activity; transferase activity; metal ion binding; magnesium ion binding; protein serine/threonine kinase activity; ATP binding; estrogen receptor binding
Cellular component	microtubule organizing center; spindle pole; cytoplasm; cytoskeleton; cytosol
Biological process	cell cycle; phosphorylation; G2/M transition of mitotic cell cycle; regulation of actin filament polymerization; inner cell mass cell fate commitment; keratinocyte differentiation; negative regulation of cyclin-dependent protein serine/threonine kinase activity; regulation of organ growth; regulation of protein-containing complex assembly; cytoplasmic sequestering of protein; sister chromatid segregation; positive regulation of apoptotic process; negative regulation of canonical Wnt signaling pathway; inner cell mass cellular morphogenesis; cell division; positive regulation of peptidyl-serine phosphorylation; hippo signaling; protein phosphorylation; hormone-mediated signaling pathway; regulation of intracellular estrogen receptor signaling pathway; mammary gland epithelial cell differentiation; regulation of ubiquitin-dependent protein catabolic process; mitotic cell cycle; G1/S transition of mitotic cell cycle; peptidyl-serine phosphorylation; intracellular signal transduction
Sources:Amigo / QuickGO
Orthologs
Databases	NCBI: entry; OMA: entry
Species	Human	Mouse
Entrez	9113	16798
Ensembl	ENSG00000131023	ENSMUSG00000040021
UniProt	O95835; Q6PJG3	Q8BYR2
RefSeq (mRNA)	NM_001270519; NM_004690; NM_001350339; NM_001350340; NM_001350392	NM_010690
RefSeq (protein)	NP_001257448; NP_004681; NP_001337268; NP_001337269; NP_001337321	NP_034820
Location (UCSC)	Chr 6: 149.66 – 149.72 Mb	Chr 10: 7.56 – 7.59 Mb
PubMed search
- Wikidata
View/Edit Human	View/Edit Mouse

Large tumor suppressor kinase 1 (LATS1) is an enzyme that in humans is encoded by the LATS1 gene.

It has been associated with the Hippo signaling pathway, where it phosphorylates YAP and TAZ to inactivate their function.

The protein encoded by this gene is a putative serine/threonine kinase that localizes to the mitotic apparatus and complexes with cell cycle controller CDC2 kinase in early mitosis. The protein is phosphorylated in a cell-cycle dependent manner, with late prophase phosphorylation remaining through metaphase. The N-terminal region of the protein binds CDC2 to form a complex showing reduced histone H1 kinase activity, indicating a role as a negative regulator of CDC2/cyclin A. In addition, the C-terminal kinase domain binds to its own N-terminal region, suggesting potential negative regulation through interference with complex formation via intramolecular binding. Biochemical and genetic data suggest a role as a tumor suppressor. This is supported by studies in knockout mice showing development of soft-tissue sarcomas, ovarian stromal cell tumors and a high sensitivity to carcinogenic treatments.

== Interactions ==
LATS1 has been shown to interact with Zyxin and Cdk1.
