= DCHS1 =

Protein-coding gene in the species Homo sapiens

Identifiers
- Aliases: DCHS1, CDH19, CDH25, CDHR6, FIB1, PCDH16, VMLDS1, MVP2, dachsous cadherin-related 1
- External IDs: OMIM: 603057; MGI: 2685011; GeneCards: DCHS1

Gene location (Human)
Chr.	Chromosome 11 (human)
Band	11p15.4	Start	6,621,330 bp
Band	11p15.4	End	6,655,809 bp

Gene location (Mouse)
Chr.	Chromosome 7 (mouse)
Band	7|7 E3	Start	105,402,197 bp
Band	7|7 E3	End	105,436,861 bp
RNA expression pattern
Bgee	Human / Mouse (ortholog); Top expressed in: tendon of biceps brachii; ganglionic eminence; cartilage tissue; ventricular zone; myometrium; body of uterus; gastric mucosa; periodontal fiber; seminal vesicula; saphenous vein / Top expressed in: internal carotid artery; external carotid artery; hand; ganglionic eminence; ventricular zone; Rostral migratory stream; genital tubercle; tail of embryo; mandibular prominence; medial ganglionic eminence; More reference expression data
BioGPS	n/a
Gene ontology
Molecular function	calcium ion binding
Cellular component	integral component of membrane; membrane; plasma membrane; apical part of cell; intracellular anatomical structure
Biological process	calcium-dependent cell-cell adhesion via plasma membrane cell adhesion molecules; cochlea development; cell migration involved in endocardial cushion formation; ossification involved in bone maturation; neurogenesis; heterophilic cell-cell adhesion via plasma membrane cell adhesion molecules; kidney development; heart morphogenesis; hippo signaling; branching involved in ureteric bud morphogenesis; cell adhesion; neural tube development; post-anal tail morphogenesis; mitral valve formation; digestive tract development; homophilic cell adhesion via plasma membrane adhesion molecules; pattern specification process; nephron development; protein localization to plasma membrane; cell-cell adhesion; mitral valve morphogenesis; condensed mesenchymal cell proliferation; cell migration; anatomical structure morphogenesis
Sources:Amigo / QuickGO
Orthologs
Databases	NCBI: entry; OMA: entry
Species	Human	Mouse
Entrez	8642	233651
Ensembl	ENSG00000166341	ENSMUSG00000036862
UniProt	Q96JQ0	E9PVD3
RefSeq (mRNA)	NM_024542; NM_003737	NM_001162943
RefSeq (protein)	NP_003728	NP_001156415
Location (UCSC)	Chr 11: 6.62 – 6.66 Mb	Chr 7: 105.4 – 105.44 Mb
PubMed search
- Wikidata
View/Edit Human	View/Edit Mouse

Protein dachsous homolog 1, also known as protocadherin-16 (PCDH16) or cadherin-19 (CDH19) or cadherin-25 (CDH25) or fibroblast cadherin-1 (FIB1), is a protein that in humans is encoded by the DCHS1 gene.

== Function ==
This gene is a member of the cadherin superfamily whose members encode calcium-dependent cell-cell adhesion molecules. The encoded protein has a signal peptide, 27 cadherin repeat domains and a unique cytoplasmic region. This particular cadherin family member is expressed in fibroblasts but not in melanocytes or keratinocytes. The cell-cell adhesion of fibroblasts is thought to be necessary for wound healing.

== Clinical significance ==
Mutations in this gene have been shown to cause mitral valve prolapse
