= WW domain =

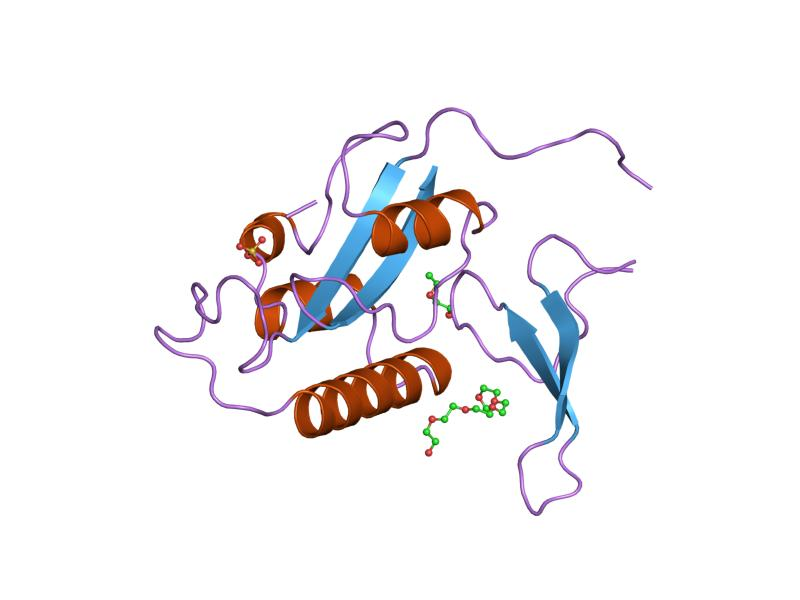
- Structure of the human mitotic rotamase Pin1.

Identifiers
- Symbol: WW
- Pfam: PF00397
- InterPro: IPR001202
- PROSITE: PDOC50020
- SCOP2: 1pin / SCOPe / SUPFAM
- CDD: cd00201
Available protein structures:
- PDB: IPR001202 PF00397 (ECOD; PDBsum)
- AlphaFold: IPR001202; PF00397

The WW domain (also known as the rsp5-domain or WWP repeating motif) is a modular protein domain that mediates specific interactions with protein ligands. This domain is found in a number of unrelated signaling and structural proteins and may be repeated up to four times in some proteins. Apart from binding preferentially to proteins that are proline-rich, with particular proline-motifs, [AP]-P-P-[AP]-Y, some WW domains bind to phosphoserine- and phosphothreonine-containing motifs.

== Structure and ligands ==
The WW domain is one of the smallest protein modules, composed of only 40 amino acids, which mediates specific protein-protein interactions with short proline-rich or proline-containing motifs. Named after the presence of two conserved tryptophans (W), which are spaced 20-22 amino acids apart within the sequence, the WW domain folds into a meandering triple-stranded beta sheet. The identification of the WW domain was facilitated by the analysis of two splice isoforms of YAP gene product, named YAP1-1 and YAP1-2, which differed by the presence of an extra 38 amino acids. These extra amino acids are encoded by a spliced-in exon and represent the second WW domain in YAP1-2 isoform.

The first structure of the WW domain was determined in solution by NMR approach. It represented the WW domain of human YAP in complex with peptide ligand containing Proline-Proline-x–Tyrosine (PPxY where x = any amino acid) consensus motif. Recently, the YAP WW domain structure in complex with SMAD-derived, PPxY motif-containing peptide was further refined. Apart from the PPxY motif, certain WW domains recognize LPxY motif (where L is Leucine), and several WW domains bind to phospho-Serine-Proline (p-SP) or phospho-Threonine-Proline (p-TP) motifs in a phospho-dependent manner. Structures of these WW domain complexes confirmed molecular details of phosphorylation-regulated interactions. There are also WW domains that interact with polyprolines that are flanked by arginine residues or interrupted by leucine residues, but they do not contain aromatic amino acids.

== Signaling function ==
The WW domain is known to mediate regulatory protein complexes in various signaling networks, including the Hippo signaling pathway. The importance of WW domain-mediated complexes in signaling was underscored by the characterization of genetic syndromes that are caused by loss-of-function point mutations in the WW domain or its cognate ligand. These syndromes are Golabi-Ito-Hall syndrome of intellectual disability caused by missense mutation in a WW domain and Liddle syndrome of hypertension caused by point mutations within PPxY motif.

== Examples ==
A large variety of proteins containing the WW domain are known. These include; dystrophin, a multidomain cytoskeletal protein; utrophin, a dystrophin-like protein; vertebrate YAP protein, substrate of LATS1 and LATS2 serine-threonine kinases of the Hippo tumor suppressor pathway; Mus musculus (Mouse) NEDD4, involved in the embryonic development and differentiation of the central nervous system; Saccharomyces cerevisiae (Baker's yeast) RSP5, similar to NEDD4 in its molecular organization; Rattus norvegicus (Rat) FE65, a transcription-factor activator expressed preferentially in brain; Nicotiana tabacum (Common tobacco) DB10 protein, amongst others.

In 2004, the first comprehensive protein-peptide interaction map for a human modular domain was reported using individually expressed WW domains and genome predicted, PPxY-containing synthetic peptides. At present in the human proteome, 98 WW domains and more than 2000 PPxY-containing peptides, have been identified from sequence analysis of the genome.

== Inhibitor ==
YAP is a WW domain-containing protein that functions as a potent oncogene. Its WW domains must be intact for YAP to act as a transcriptional co-activator that induces expression of proliferative genes. Recent study has shown that endohedral metallofullerenol, a compound that was originally developed as a contrasting agent for MRI (magnetic resonance imaging), has antineoplastic properties. Via molecular dynamic simulations, the ability of this compound to outcompete proline-rich peptides and bind effectively to the WW domain of YAP was documented. Endohedral metallofullerenol may represent a lead compound for the development of therapies for cancer patients who harbor amplified or overexpressed YAP.

== In the study of protein folding ==
Because of its small size and well-defined structure, the WW domain was developed by the Gruebele and Kelly groups into a favorite subject of protein folding studies. Among these studies, the work of Rama Ranganathan and David E. Shaw are also notable. Ranganathan’s team has shown that a simple statistical energy function, which identifies co-evolution between amino acid residues within the WW domain, is necessary and sufficient to specify sequence that folds into native structure. Using such an algorithm, he and his team synthesized libraries of artificial WW domains that functioned in a very similar manner to their natural counterparts, recognizing class-specific proline-rich ligand peptides, The Shaw laboratory developed a specialized machine that allowed elucidation of the atomic level behavior of the WW domain on a biologically relevant time scale. He and his team employed equilibrium simulations of a WW domain and identified seven unfolding and eight folding events.

Being relatively short, 30 to 35 amino acids long, WW domain is amenable to chemical synthesis. It is cooperatively folded and can host chemically introduced non-canonical amino acids. Based on these properties, WW domain has been shown to be a versatile platform for the chemical interrogation of intramolecular interactions and conformational propensities in folded proteins.
