= TP53BP2 =

Protein-coding gene in humans

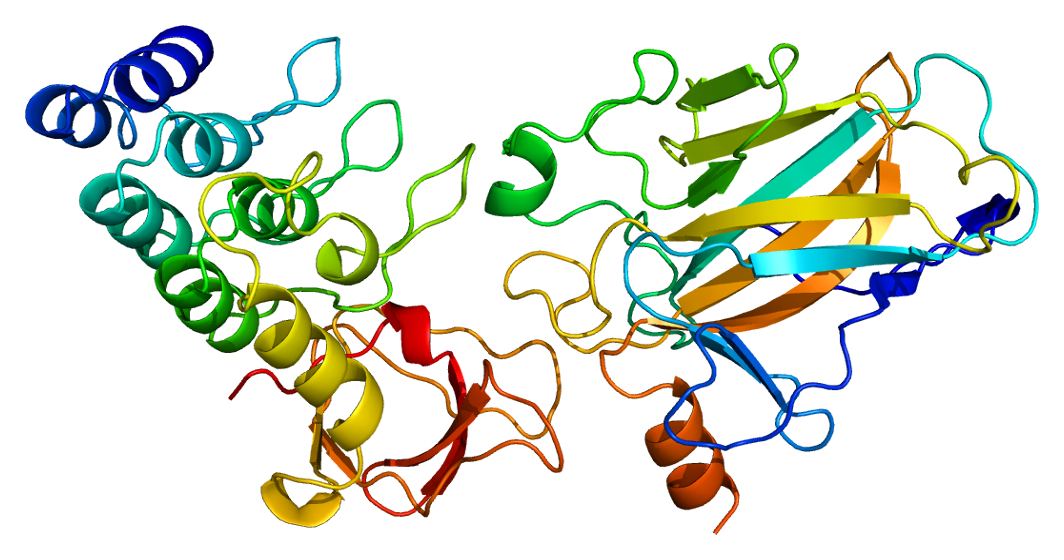

Identifiers
- Aliases: TP53BP2, 53BP2, ASPP2, BBP, P53BP2, PPP1R13A, tumor protein p53 binding protein 2
- External IDs: OMIM: 602143; MGI: 2138319; GeneCards: TP53BP2
Available structures
PDB	Ortholog search: PDBe RCSB
PDB	List of PDB id codes 1YCS, 2UWQ, 4A63, 4IRV

Gene location (Human)
Chr.	Chromosome 1 (human)
Band	1q41	Start	223,779,893 bp
Band	1q41	End	223,845,954 bp

Gene location (Mouse)
Chr.	Chromosome 1 (mouse)
Band	1 H5|1 84.93 cM	Start	182,236,737 bp
Band	1 H5|1 84.93 cM	End	182,289,997 bp
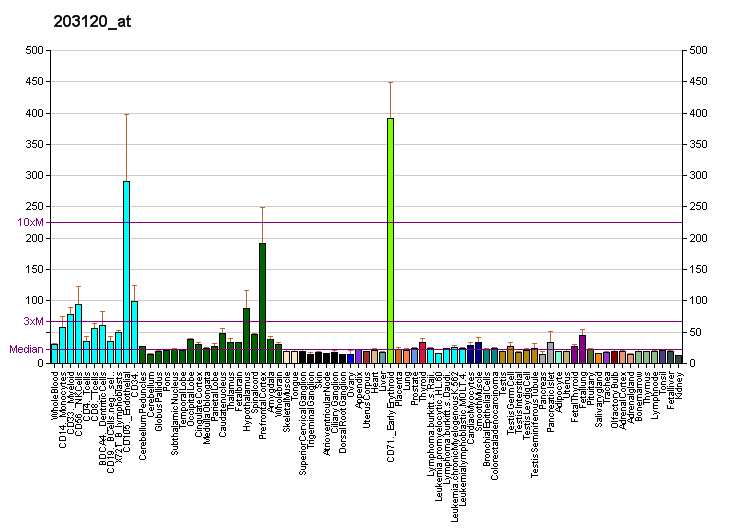
RNA expression pattern
Bgee	Human / Mouse (ortholog); Top expressed in: ventricular zone; ganglionic eminence; caudate nucleus; putamen; external globus pallidus; nucleus accumbens; amygdala; retinal pigment epithelium; pars reticulata; epithelium of colon / Top expressed in: genital tubercle; tail of embryo; vestibular membrane of cochlear duct; hand; superior cervical ganglion; glomerulus; otolith organ; utricle; lumbar subsegment of spinal cord; human kidney; More reference expression data
BioGPS	More reference expression data
Gene ontology
Molecular function	protein binding; identical protein binding; p53 binding; SH3 domain binding; NF-kappaB binding
Cellular component	perinuclear region of cytoplasm; nucleus; cytoplasm; mitochondrion; nucleoplasm; cytosol; cell junction
Biological process	cell cycle; negative regulation of cell cycle; positive regulation of execution phase of apoptosis; signal transduction; intrinsic apoptotic signaling pathway by p53 class mediator; apoptotic process; positive regulation of neuron death; regulation of signal transduction by p53 class mediator; regulation of apoptotic process; positive regulation of protein insertion into mitochondrial membrane involved in apoptotic signaling pathway
Sources:Amigo / QuickGO
Orthologs
Databases	NCBI: entry; OMA: entry
Species	Human	Mouse
Entrez	7159	209456
Ensembl	ENSG00000143514	ENSMUSG00000026510
UniProt	Q13625	Q8CG79
RefSeq (mRNA)	NM_001031685; NM_005426	NM_173378
RefSeq (protein)	NP_001026855; NP_005417	NP_775554
Location (UCSC)	Chr 1: 223.78 – 223.85 Mb	Chr 1: 182.24 – 182.29 Mb
PubMed search
- Wikidata
View/Edit Human	View/Edit Mouse

Apoptosis-stimulating of p53 protein 2 (ASPP2) also known as Bcl2-binding protein (Bbp) and tumor suppressor p53-binding protein 2 (p53BP2) is a protein that in humans is encoded by the TP53BP2 gene. Multiple transcript variants encoding different isoforms have been found for this gene.

== Nomenclature ==
ASPP2 (amino acid residues 600 –1128) was initially identified as 53BP2 (p53-binding protein 2) in a yeast two hybrid screen using p53 as the bait. Another yeast two hybrid screening in which Bcl-2 was used as the bait gave rise to the discovery of another fragment of ASPP2 (residues 123-1128) and it was called Bbp. The full length ASPP2 (1128 amino acids) was identified later.

== Function ==
ASPP2 plays a central role in regulation of apoptosis and cell growth via its interactions. ASPP2 regulates TP53 by enhancing the DNA binding and transactivation function of TP53 on the promoters of proapoptotic genes in vivo. ASPP2 binds to wild-type p53 but fails to bind to mutant p53, suggesting that ASPP2 may be involved in the ability of wild-type p53 to suppress transformation. ASPP2 induces apoptosis but no cell cycle arrest.

== Structure ==
ASPP2 contains several structural and functional domains. Its N-terminus (residues 1–83) has the structure of a β-grasp ubiquitin-like fold. It is followed by a predicted α-helical domain located between aa 123 and 323. and a proline-rich (ASPP2 Pro) domain between aa 674 and 902. The C-terminal part of ASPP2 contains four ankyrin repeats and an SH3 domain involved in protein-protein interactions. ASPP2 is found in the perinuclear region of the cytoplasm.

== Family members ==
The ASPP family includes ASPP1, ASPP2, and iASPP. The name ASPP stands for apoptosis stimulating protein of p53, the name emphasizes the ankyrin repeats, SH3 domain, and proline-rich domains that characterize this family. The three family members come from different genes but ASPP1 and ASPP2 share a greater sequence similarity than either does with iASPP as the N terminus of iASPP has no homology with ASPP1 and ASPP2. The sequence similarities among ASPP family members indicates that ASPP1 and ASPP2 probably have similar biological functions that differ from that of iASPP. The family plays a key role in apoptosis regulation in the intrinsic and extrinsic apoptotic pathways. ASPP1 and ASPP2 promote, while iASPP inhibits, apoptosis.

== Binding partners ==
ASPP2 is the ASPP family member with the most known binding partners. The highly conserved C-terminus was first known to bind to p53 through its ankyrin repeats and SH3 domain in 1994 by a yeast two hybrid system and it was called p53 Binding Protein 2 (53BP2). Other binding partners have been discovered through the years, indicating the importance of the ankyrin repeats and SH3 domains for protein-protein interactions. Some of the known binding partners of ASPP2 include BCL2, p63, p73, Hepatitis C virus core protein, Amyloid-b-Precursor Protein-Binding Protein 1 (APP-BP1), YES-Associated Protein (YAP), Adenomatosis Polyposis Coli 2 (APC2), RelA/p65, Protein Phosphatase 1 (PP1) and NFκB (p65)

== Expression ==
The expression of ASPP2 is encoded by the gene TP53BP2 and is located in the long arm of chromosome 1 at q42.1. Northern-blot analyses showed that the ASPP2/53BP2 mRNA was expressed in many human tissues such as heart, brain, placenta, lung, liver, skeletal muscle, kidney, pancreas, but at varying levels. The highest expression level of ASPP2 was detected in skeletal tissue.

== Clinical significance ==
ASPP2 was first associated with human cancer when the crystal structure of p53 binding domain bound to the C-terminal ankyrin repeats and SH3 domain of ASP2. All the amino acids of p53 that are important for binding ASPP2 are mutated in human cancers. ASPP2 expression levels have been associated with cellular sensitivity to apoptosis. ASPP2 importance in human malignancies is emphasized by studies that show that downregulation of ASPP2 is commonly found in tumors and carcinoma cells expressing wild type p53, and to a lesser extent mutant p53. For example, it was found to be downregulated in both metastatic and invasive cells as compared to normal breast epithelium. It has been demonstrated the binding of ASPP2 to bcl-2 and p53 and to impede cell cycle progression at G2-M, as well as the fact that binding of ASPP2 to p53 changes the conformation of p53 and increases p53 binding to the promoters of proapoptotic genes such as Bax and PIG-3 but not those of G1-arrest genes such as p21waf1. Single nucleotide polymorphisms of ASPP2 have also shown to be associated with predisposition of gastric cancer development. These could be due to the fact that ASPP2 is also a tumor suppressor as well as an activator of p53.

Levels of expression of ASPP2 are important, high levels of expression play an important role in inducing apoptosis independently of p53, mediated by p63 and p73. The expression is enhanced in response to DNA damage. On the other hand, silencing of ASPP2 expression by methylation was observed in several human carcinoma cells.
