= STK4 =

Protein-coding gene in the species Homo sapiens

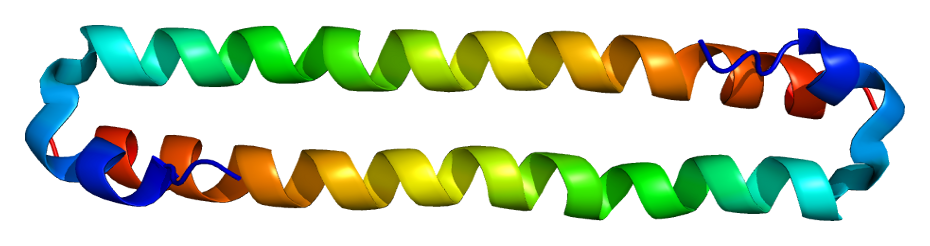

Identifiers
- Aliases: STK4, KRS2, MST1, TIIAC, YSK3, serine/threonine kinase 4
- External IDs: OMIM: 604965; MGI: 1929004; GeneCards: STK4
Available structures
PDB	Ortholog search: PDBe RCSB
PDB	List of PDB id codes 3COM, 4NR2, 4OH8, 2JO8
Enzyme activity
EC #	BRENDA	ExPASy	KEGG	MetaCyc
2.7.11.1	↗	↗	↗	↗

Gene location (Human)
Chr.	Chromosome 20 (human)
Band	20q13.12	Start	44,966,479 bp
Band	20q13.12	End	45,080,021 bp

Gene location (Mouse)
Chr.	Chromosome 2 (mouse)
Band	2|2 H3	Start	163,912,242 bp
Band	2|2 H3	End	163,997,444 bp
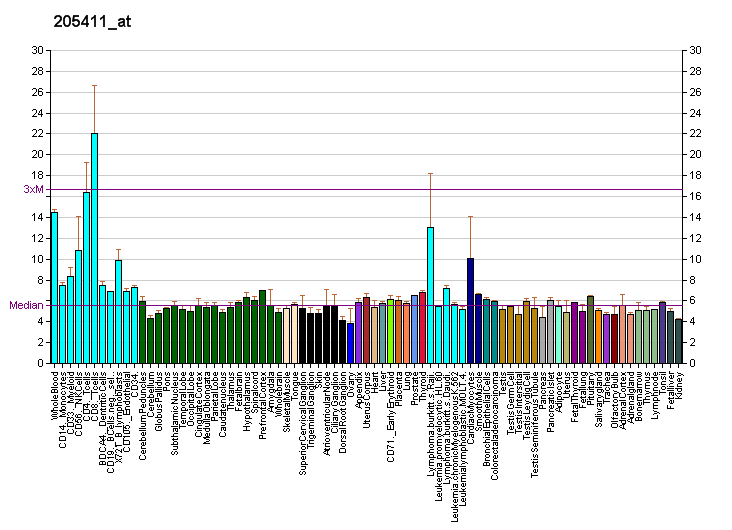

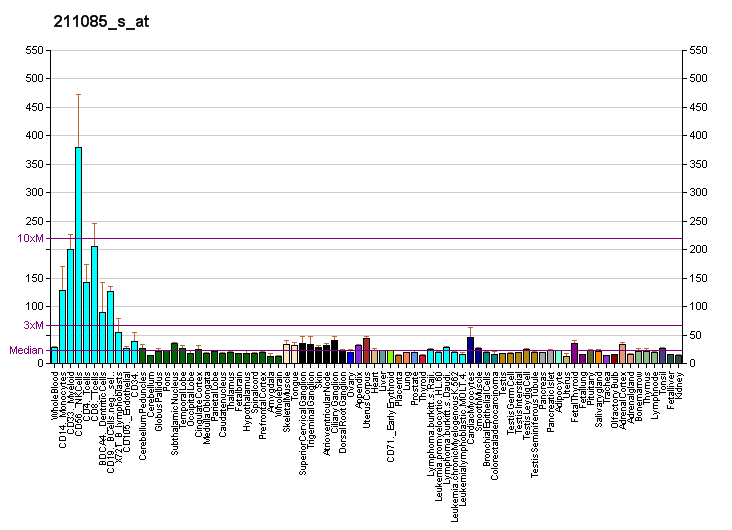
RNA expression pattern
Bgee	Human / Mouse (ortholog); Top expressed in: epithelium of colon; buccal mucosa cell; blood; monocyte; superficial temporal artery; trabecular bone; pylorus; tonsil; lymph node; saphenous vein / Top expressed in: mesenteric lymph nodes; blood; right lung lobe; fossa; spleen; condyle; left lung lobe; thymus; stroma of bone marrow; Gonadal ridge; More reference expression data
BioGPS	More reference expression data
Gene ontology
Molecular function	transferase activity; protein kinase activity; nucleotide binding; protein dimerization activity; protein homodimerization activity; transcription factor binding; protein serine/threonine kinase activator activity; metal ion binding; kinase activity; protein serine/threonine kinase activity; protein binding; identical protein binding; ATP binding; magnesium ion binding
Cellular component	cytoplasm; nucleus; nucleoplasm; cytosol; nuclear body; protein-containing complex
Biological process	regulation of cell differentiation involved in embryonic placenta development; positive regulation of extrinsic apoptotic signaling pathway via death domain receptors; positive regulation of protein phosphorylation; intracellular signal transduction; phosphorylation; protein stabilization; hippo signaling; keratinocyte differentiation; positive regulation of peptidyl-serine phosphorylation; endocardium development; protein phosphorylation; primitive hemopoiesis; central nervous system development; peptidyl-serine phosphorylation; cell morphogenesis; positive regulation of apoptotic process; branching involved in blood vessel morphogenesis; protein autophosphorylation; positive regulation of protein binding; cell differentiation involved in embryonic placenta development; positive regulation of fat cell differentiation; negative regulation of organ growth; neural tube formation; negative regulation of canonical Wnt signaling pathway; signal transduction; negative regulation of cell population proliferation; hepatocyte apoptotic process; apoptotic process; positive regulation of protein serine/threonine kinase activity; regulation of mitotic cell cycle; stress-activated protein kinase signaling cascade; positive regulation of vascular associated smooth muscle cell apoptotic process; activation of protein kinase activity
Sources:Amigo / QuickGO
Orthologs
Databases	NCBI: entry; OMA: entry
Species	Human	Mouse
Entrez	6789	58231
Ensembl	ENSG00000101109	ENSMUSG00000018209
UniProt	Q13043	Q9JI11
RefSeq (mRNA)	NM_006282; NM_001352385	NM_021420
RefSeq (protein)	NP_006273; NP_001339314	NP_067395
Location (UCSC)	Chr 20: 44.97 – 45.08 Mb	Chr 2: 163.91 – 164 Mb
PubMed search
- Wikidata
View/Edit Human	View/Edit Mouse

Serine/threonine-protein kinase 4 is an enzyme that in humans is encoded by the STK4 gene.

== Function ==
The protein encoded by this gene is a cytoplasmic kinase that is structurally similar to the yeast Ste20p (sterile 20 protein) kinase, which acts upstream of the stress-induced mitogen-activated protein kinase (MAPK) cascade. The encoded protein can phosphorylate myelin basic protein and undergoes autophosphorylation. A caspase-cleaved fragment of the encoded protein has been shown to be capable of phosphorylating histone H2B. The particular phosphorylation catalyzed by this protein has been correlated with apoptosis, and it's possible that this protein induces the chromatin condensation observed in this process.

== Interactions ==
STK4 has been shown to interact with THAP12.

STK4 has also been shown to prevent, through Yap1 coactivator modulation, haematological tumor cell apoptosis.
