= SAV1 =

Protein-coding gene in the species Homo sapiens

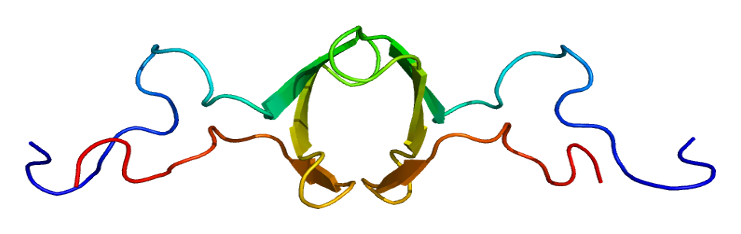
Available structures
PDB	Ortholog search: PDBe RCSB
PDB	List of PDB id codes 2DWV, 2YSB

Identifiers
- Aliases: SAV1, SAV, WW45, WWP4, salvador family WW domain containing protein 1
- External IDs: OMIM: 607203; MGI: 1927144; HomoloGene: 32517; GeneCards: SAV1; OMA:SAV1 - orthologs

Gene location (Human)
Chr.	Chromosome 14 (human)
Band	14q22.1	Start	50,632,058 bp
Band	14q22.1	End	50,668,306 bp

Gene location (Mouse)
Chr.	Chromosome 12 (mouse)
Band	12|12 C2	Start	70,011,786 bp
Band	12|12 C2	End	70,033,776 bp
RNA expression pattern
Bgee	Human / Mouse (ortholog); Top expressed in: oocyte; mucosa of paranasal sinus; secondary oocyte; nipple; lactiferous duct; olfactory zone of nasal mucosa; Achilles tendon; urethra; body of pancreas; superficial temporal artery / Top expressed in: gastrula; spermatocyte; intercostal muscle; decidua; interventricular septum; calvaria; arm; upper arm; triceps brachii muscle; temporal muscle; More reference expression data
BioGPS	n/a
Gene ontology
Molecular function	protein binding; molecular adaptor activity; identical protein binding
Cellular component	cytoplasm; nucleus; cytosol; intracellular anatomical structure
Biological process	hair follicle development; ventricular septum morphogenesis; lung epithelial cell differentiation; protein stabilization; positive regulation of DNA-binding transcription factor activity; regulation of stem cell population maintenance; negative regulation of cardiac muscle cell proliferation; regulation of organ growth; positive regulation of fat cell differentiation; hippo signaling; intestinal epithelial cell differentiation; signal transduction; keratinocyte differentiation; negative regulation of epithelial cell proliferation; positive regulation of apoptotic process; apoptotic process; regulation of cell population proliferation
Sources:Amigo / QuickGO
Orthologs
Species	Human	Mouse
Entrez	60485	64010
Ensembl	ENSG00000151748	ENSMUSG00000021067
UniProt	Q9H4B6	Q8VEB2
RefSeq (mRNA)	NM_021818	NM_022028
RefSeq (protein)	NP_068590	NP_071311
Location (UCSC)	Chr 14: 50.63 – 50.67 Mb	Chr 12: 70.01 – 70.03 Mb
PubMed search
- Wikidata
View/Edit Human	View/Edit Mouse

Protein salvador homolog 1 is a protein that in humans is encoded by the SAV1 gene.

WW domain-containing proteins are found in all eukaryotes and play an important role in the regulation of a wide variety of cellular functions such as protein degradation, transcription, and RNA splicing. This gene encodes a protein which contains 2 WW domains and a coiled-coil region. It is ubiquitously expressed in adult tissues. The encoded protein is 94% identical to the mouse protein at the amino acid level.
