= MOB kinase activator 1A =

Protein found in humans

MOB1A

Identifiers
- Aliases: MOB1A, C2orf6, MATS1, MOB1, MOBK1B, MOBKL1B, Mob4B, MOB kinase activator 1A, MABKL1B
- External IDs: OMIM: 609281; MGI: 2442631; GeneCards: MOB1A
Available structures
PDB	Ortholog search: PDBe RCSB
PDB	List of PDB id codes 4J1V, 4JIZ, 5BRK, 5BRM

Gene location (Human)
Chr.	Chromosome 2 (human)
Band	2p13.1	Start	74,152,528 bp
Band	2p13.1	End	74,178,898 bp

Gene location (Mouse)
Chr.	Chromosome 6 (mouse)
Band	6|6 C3	Start	83,302,998 bp
Band	6|6 C3	End	83,320,758 bp
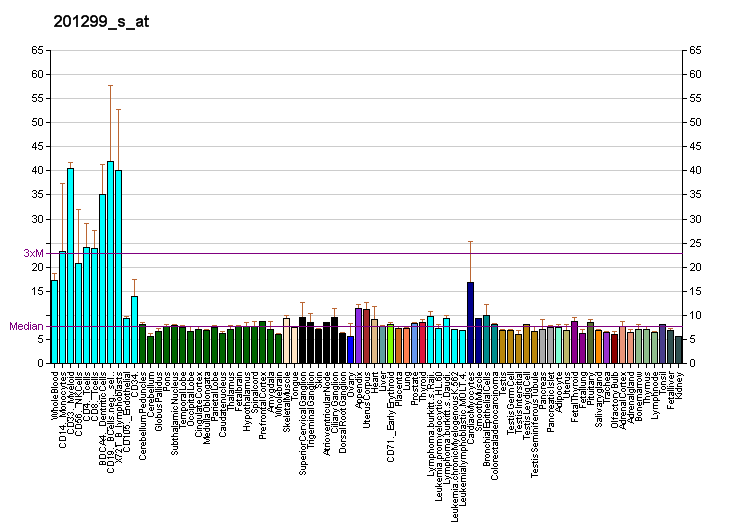

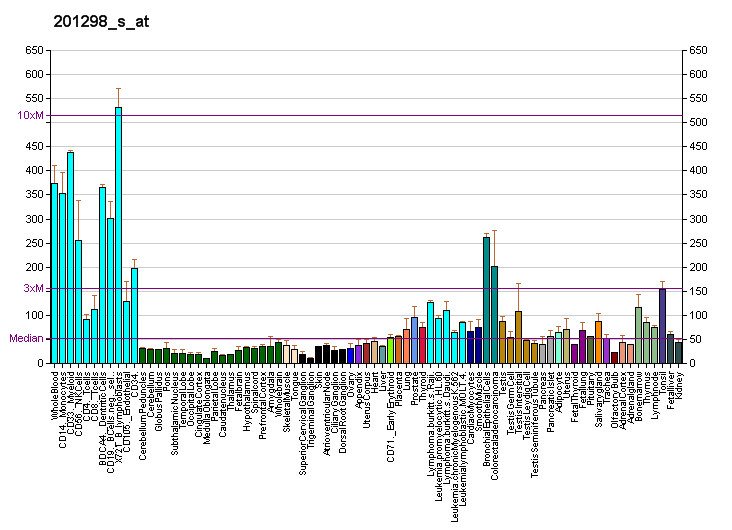

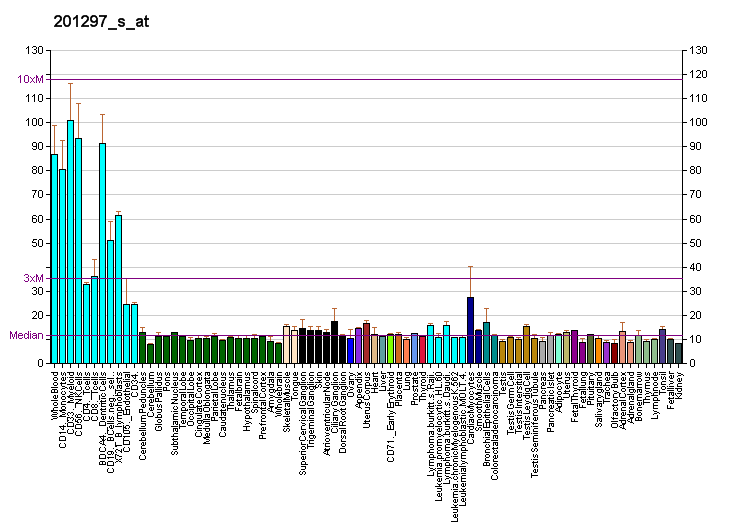
RNA expression pattern
Bgee	Human / Mouse (ortholog); Top expressed in: monocyte; epithelium of nasopharynx; superficial temporal artery; secondary oocyte; bone marrow cell; lymph node; cecum; appendix; hair follicle; palpebral conjunctiva / Top expressed in: Ileal epithelium; mesenteric lymph nodes; corneal stroma; granulocyte; stroma of bone marrow; Paneth cell; gastrula; endothelial cell of lymphatic vessel; spleen; genital tubercle; More reference expression data
BioGPS	More reference expression data
Gene ontology
Molecular function	metal ion binding; protein binding
Cellular component	extracellular exosome; nucleus; nucleolus; cytosol
Biological process	hippo signaling
Sources:Amigo / QuickGO
Orthologs
Databases	NCBI: entry; OMA: entry
Species	Human	Mouse
Entrez	55233	232157
Ensembl	ENSG00000114978	ENSMUSG00000043131
UniProt	Q9H8S9	Q921Y0
RefSeq (mRNA)	NM_018221; NM_001317110; NM_001317111; NM_001317112	NM_145571
RefSeq (protein)	NP_001304039; NP_001304040; NP_001304041; NP_060691	NP_663546
Location (UCSC)	Chr 2: 74.15 – 74.18 Mb	Chr 6: 83.3 – 83.32 Mb
PubMed search
- Wikidata
View/Edit Human	View/Edit Mouse

MOB kinase activator 1A is an enzyme that in humans is encoded by the MOB1A gene (previously MOBK1B). This protein is part of the hippo signaling pathway.
