= Treatment of Rett syndrome =

- Specialty: Clinical psychologist, psychiatry, pediatrics

There is no cure for Rett syndrome. Treatment is directed towards improving function and addressing symptoms throughout life. A multi-disciplinary team approach is typically used to treat the person throughout life. This team may include primary care physician, physical therapist, occupational therapist, speech-language pathologist, nutritionist, and support services in academic and occupational settings.

Treatment of Rett syndrome includes:

- management of gastrointestinal (reflux, constipation) and nutritional (poor weight gain) issues
- surveillance of scoliosis
- surveillance of long QT syndrome by annual EKG
- increasing the patient's communication skills, especially with augmentative communication strategies
- parental counseling
- modifying social medications
- sleep aids
- selective serotonin reuptake inhibitors (SSRIs)
- anti-psychotics (for self-harming behaviors)
- beta-blockers for long QT syndrome
- occupational therapy, speech therapy and physical therapy

Because of the increased risk of sudden cardiac death, when long QT syndrome is found on an annual screening EKG it is treated with an anti-arrhythmic such as a beta-blocker. There is some evidence that phenytoin may be more effective than a beta-blocker.

== Therapeutic ==
=== Trofinetide ===
Trofinetide, sold under the brand name Daybue, is a medication used for the treatment of Rett syndrome. It is taken by mouth.

The most common adverse reactions include diarrhea and vomiting.

Trofinetide was approved for medical use in the United States in March 2023. The US Food and Drug Administration (FDA) considers it to be a first-in-class medication.

== Occupational therapy ==
The symptoms of RTT severely limit individuals from independently taking part in meaningful activities in their day-to-day lives. As a result, most people with this disorder are very dependent on their caregivers in most areas of their lives. Occupational therapists (OTs) try to find ways to encourage these individuals to take part in activities that are meaningful to them, as this has been shown to improve health and well-being. The goals of occupational therapy interventions are to maintain or improve the functional abilities of individuals with this disorder. It is important to remember that services for each individual with RTT can differ greatly. OTs work together with clients and their families to help clients achieve their unique goals. OTs not only provide direct services for the client and families, but they can also connect family members to information and resources outside of occupational therapy. Services provided may include but are not limited to: maintaining motor and daily living skills and maintaining cognitive and communication functioning.

== Physical therapy ==
Goals of physical therapy treatment include improving and maintaining function by addressing impairments in mobility, posture, cardiovascular endurance, coordination, and balance. A physical therapist can also fit braces, casts, and assistive devices as necessary to those with Rett syndrome to address bony malformations, and stabilize joints.

=== Hydrotherapy ===
Hydrotherapy is an alternative is a branch of both physiotherapy and occupational therapy. There is some evidence to suggest that hydrotherapy can improve movements, feeding skills, motor skills and walking balance in children with Rett syndrome.

== Self-care ==
Some symptoms such as involuntary stereotypical hand movements can make eating a very difficult self-care task for individuals with RTT. One way OTs address this problem is by educating and encouraging caregivers to practice guided feeding. Guided feeding involves having the individual with RTT grasp the spoon, with the caregiver's hand on top of the child's to guide eating movements. The purpose of this therapy is to encourage involvement in this important self-care activity, particularly for individuals with severe cases of RTT. Signals such as opening their mouth in preparation for food, rejecting unwanted foods, and spending an increased amount of time watching their helpers, indicates that guided feeding therapy can increase engagement in eating in some cases.

Another way OTs may increase involvement in eating and hand function in general is by making hand splints. Research suggests that hand splints place the hand in a more functional position and prevent repetitive motion; this leads to better finger and spoon-feeding skills. Although fully independent feeding is rare for individuals with RTT, hand splints allow them to become more engaged in eating. Alternatively, active participation can be encouraged through the use of elbow splints, which decrease the repetitive stereotyped arm movements characteristic of RTT. As a result, socialization and interaction with the environment during eating may increase.

Other adaptations to eating include altering the pace of feeding and recommending specific foods and textures that the individual is easily able to swallow, which is difficult done by a speech therapist. In addition, OTs provide adaptive devices such as cuffs and loops (to help the individual hold their utensils), large handled utensils that are easier to grasp, and cups with lids to assist with eating and address proper nutrition. In general, all of these therapeutic methods are aimed at improving the quality of the swallowing response and general eating performance. Although parental and self-reports indicate good appetite in most of the population, weight loss is an issue that many individuals with RTT face. This suggests the importance of proper nutritional education for both the individual and their caregivers. This education, along with meal management and planning, may be provided by the Speech and language therapist often in consultation with OT, a nutritionist or dietitian.

Seating and positioning the individual can also affect how they do daily tasks such as eating, dressing, and grooming. For an individual to engage in these tasks, OTs may adjust and modify tables, chairs, and wheelchairs to promote positive interactions within different social environments. OTs are also involved in educating families on various adaptive devices that can promote comfort, ease of use, and safety for children and their caregivers. Some of the commonly used adaptive devices include bath benches, toilet chairs, and movable shower heads. Finally, occupational therapists work with children and their families to develop skills required to brush their teeth and hair, bathe, and dress.

If children with RTT are in school during the day, OTs PTs and speech pathologists can play a role in teaching special education assistants (SEAs) about the self-care needs of the child. This can include education on feeding techniques that are suitable for the child, proper mechanics of lifts and transfers, as well as toileting techniques and routines.

== Leisure ==
Children with RTT need to engage and participate in leisure activities just like typically developing children. Play is the primary activity of childhood, and is considered both a form of leisure and productivity. It is essential to development as it facilitates cognitive, physical, social, and emotional well-being. Play is an activity with multiple purposes; it provides opportunities for a child to grow and develop, explore, learn, build relationships, and develop interests. Because play is so central to a child's development, therapists try to find ways that allow these children to play. The support team, including the special education teacher, OT, PT, and speech pathologist, work with clients and their family to make sure that the interventions focus on play activities that are meaningful to the child, whether it be arts, music, sports, computer games, and/or maintaining social relationships.

There is no set list of the services that are provided in terms of leisure activities, as the team works with the child to find activities that he or she finds enjoyable and important. Some examples of how the team may facilitate play include adapting bicycles, providing switches so that the child can turn on music/video players, and connecting the child and her family to resources and programs within the community.

In addition, some therapeutic activities are regarded as highly enjoyable for children with RTT and can be considered a form of play as well as therapy. One such activity that children with RTT may participate in is aquatic, or swimming therapy. The aims of swimming therapy are to promote relaxation, improve circulation, strengthen muscles, and improve coordination and balance. Aquatic therapy is an enjoyable and relaxing activity for children with RTT, and in some cases therapy has been associated with a decrease in abnormal hand movements and an increase in goal directed hand movements and feeding skills. Examples of other activities that are therapeutic and enjoyable include horseback riding therapy and music therapy.

== Speech therapy ==
Individuals with RTT often do not develop, or lose the ability to communicate through speech. If these individuals cannot communicate with their family and caregivers it makes it very difficult for them to participate in daily activities as they also have severe physical difficulties. Speech-language pathologists plan communication interventions that aim to increase the skills needed for carrying out self-care, productivity, and leisure tasks. Studies suggest that only twenty percent of the people with RTT had the use of words, and most of these words were used out of context and without meaning. As a result of their lack of spoken language, individuals with RTT can benefit from Augmentative and Alternative Communication (AAC), which are communication methods used in place of speech. Examples of AAC may be written language, body language, and facial expressions. It is within the scope of practice for speech-language pathologists to provide a thorough AAC evaluation taking into consideration all factors such as sensory, motor, kinesthetic, speech, and receptive as well as expressive language in its verbal and non-verbal forms.

The Speech and Language Therapist will assess the person for signs of respiratory compromise and other symptoms of swallowing difficulty, and negotiate management strategies based on balancing and maintaining the persons physical safety, psychological well-being and quality of life. The speech pathologist works with the family, caregivers and client to improve communication and social interaction. This may include using an aac device, eye contact or using their body to communicate their wants and needs to others.

=== Communication ===
Individuals with RTT often do not develop, or lose the ability to communicate through speech. If these individuals cannot communicate with their family and caregivers it makes it very difficult for them to participate in daily activities as they also have severe physical difficulties. Speech-language pathologists plan communication interventions that aim to increase the skills needed for carrying out self-care, productivity, and leisure tasks. Studies suggest that only twenty percent of the people with RTT had the use of words, and most of these words were used out of context and without meaning. As a result of their lack of spoken language, individuals with RTT can benefit from Augmentative and Alternative Communication (AAC), which are communication methods used in place of speech. Examples of AAC may be written language, body language, and facial expressions. It is within the scope of practice for speech-language pathologists to provide a thorough AAC evaluation taking into consideration all factors such as sensory, motor, kinesthetic, speech, and receptive as well as expressive language in its verbal and non-verbal forms. OTs are consulted in this process, to determine motor or sensory skills and deficits, as well as seating and positioning. This evaluation will result in a recommendation of AAC systems, which often include low-technology, mid-technology and high-technology systems. A speech-language pathologist will also provide therapy to help the client with RTT to access and learn the systems once they are procured, through private funds, school districts, or private/public medical insurance.

Some of the AAC systems common to individuals with RTT include eye-gaze boards, communication boards, switches, or voice output communication devices. Speech-Language Pathologists (SLPs), often with specialized AAC training and knowledge, provide education and training to families, educational teams, and other communication partners on these tools. AAC options are often divided into three levels of technology: no technology, low technology, and higher technology (mid-tech or high-tech, consisting of systems requiring the use of a battery or powercord). The simplest way to communicate is through 'no technology' or "unaided" methods in which the individuals with RTT indicates a response (i.e., points, blinks their eyes, raises their eyebrows) to indicate a response. The second type are 'low technology' communication systems which often include using pictures, symbols, and/or objects placed on a board. A person then uses eye gaze or finger pointing to show his or her choices. Communication boards can be set up by the SLP and OT in both home and school environments. The third and most complex level of technology is 'higher technology'. Some of the more commonly used technological devices include voice output systems and computer communication software. Low-technology, mid-technology, and high-technology systems are considered "aided" systems, as they require the use of an object other than one's own body to communicate. The SLP and OT work with the child, as well as the family, caregivers, and school assistants to encourage the child to communicate as much as possible by using all these different tools.

== Research ==
Studies, funded by the International Rett Syndrome Foundation, demonstrate that neurological deficits resulting from loss of MeCP2 can be reversed upon restoration of gene function. These studies are quite exciting because they show that neurons that have suffered the consequences of loss of MeCP2 function are poised to regain functionality once MeCP2 is provided gradually and in the correct spatial distribution. This provides hope for restoring neuronal function in patients with RTT.

However, the strategy in humans will require providing the critical factors that function downstream of MeCP2 because of the challenges in delivering the correct MeCP2 dosage only to neurons that lack it, given that the slightest perturbation in MeCP2 level is deleterious. Thus, therapeutic strategies necessitate the identification of the molecular mechanisms underlying individual RTT phenotypes and picking out the candidates that can be therapeutically targeted.

The next phase of research needs to assess how complete the recovery is. Clearly, lethality, level of activity, and hippocampal plasticity are rescued, but are the animals free of any other RTT signs such as social behavior deficits, anxiety, and cognitive impairments? Since postnatal rescue results in viability, it will be important to evaluate if even the subtler phenotypes of RTT and MeCP2 disorders are rescued when protein function is restored postnatally. This is particularly important given emerging data about early neonatal experiences and their long-term effects on behavior in adults.

GW Pharmaceuticals is running a 252-subject Phase 3 clinical trial in 2019 with Epidiolex (CBD) in an attempt to treat Rett syndrome.

Trofinetide is a novel synthetic analog of the amino‐terminal tripeptide of IGF-1 designed to treat the core symptoms of Rett syndrome by reducing neuroinflammation and supporting synaptic function, it has been developed by Neuren pharmaceuticals. It has shown — in a phase 2 randomised double blind placebo control trial (RDBPC) — to have statistically significant and clinically relevant improvements to the baseline testing at doses of 200 mg/kg in pediatric patients. A stage 3 RDBPC has been completed with a greater number of participants and over a longer time scale and a new drug application for Trofinetide was submitted to the FDA in mid 2022 and accepted for priority review.
