= Rett =

Rett may refer to:

- Andreas Rett (1924–1997), Austrian neurologist and author
- Arbeidets Rett, local newspaper published in Røros, Norway
- Rett syndrome, neurodevelopmental disorder of the grey matter of the brain that affects girls almost exclusively

== See also ==
- Retting, process employing the action of micro-organisms to dissolve cellular tissues to separate the fibre from the stem
