= FOXG1 syndrome =

- Other names: FOXG1-related epileptic-dyskinetic encephalopathy, Rett syndrome, congenital variant.
- FOXG1 syndrome is inherited in an Autosomal dominant fashion
- Specialty: Medical genetics, Neurology
- Usual onset: From birth
- Causes: Mutation in a gene FOXG1
- Differential diagnosis: Rett syndrome, CDKL5 deficiency disorder, Angelman syndrome
- Treatment: Physical therapy,Anti-dyskinetic medications, Antiseizure medication
- Frequency: 1:30 000 live births

FOXG1 syndrome (sometimes FOXG1-related disorder) is a rare genetic disorder caused by mutation in the gene FOXG1. The main signs of this disease are: severe intellectual disability, microcephaly, epilepsy, and hyperkinetic-dyskinetic movement disorder and hypotonia with brain structure anomalies.

FOXG1 syndrome is inherited in autosomal dominant fashion. The syndrome affects about 1/30 000 births, with about 1200 cases having been reported as of January 1, 2025.

== Symptoms ==
Most frequently, people with FOXG1 syndrome have abnormal hand movements, problems with walking, dyskinesia, difficulties with feeding, hypotonia, strabismus, progressive microcephaly, and anomalies of the corpus callosum. They also frequently exhibit absence of speech, autistic behavior, teeth grinding or clenching, delayed myelination, bilateral tonic-clonic seizures, choreoathetosis, intellectual disability, gastroesophageal reflux disease (GERD), weight loss, constipation, sialorrhea (drooling), frequent crying without apparent cause, frequent laughing, muscle spasticity, vision problems, tardive dyskinesias, poor eye contact, myoclonic jerks, postnatal growth failure, and short stature. Occasionally, patients may also experience abnormal breathing, scoliosis with or without kyphosis, hypoplasia of the optic disk, poor speech, inability to ambulate, developmental regression, and pachygyria. In very rare cases, they might have repeated seizures without recovery.

== Diagnosis ==
The diagnostic criteria for FOXG1 syndrome have been established. Major diagnostic criteria include a de novo mutation in the FOXG1 gene, intellectual disability, an uneventful prenatal period, onset of symptoms within the first months of life, secondary microcephaly, poor muscle tone, severely delayed development with absent speech, and EEG abnormalities. Minor criteria include an irritable mood, facial dysmorphism (such as widely spaced eyes, anteverted ears, and a bulging forehead), strabismus (squint), teeth grinding, GERD, constipation, seizures, sleep pattern anomalies, dystonia, stereotypies, and autistic behaviors.

== Cause ==
FOXG1 syndrome is caused by heterozygous mutations in the gene FOXG1. This gene provides instructions for making the protein Forkhead box protein G1 (FOXG1). Most people with FOXG1 syndrome have a new mutation (which means that mutation is new and none of the parents have it), although there have been cases of person inheriting the pathogenic variant of FOXG1 from a healthy parent due to somatic mosaicism.

== Pathophysiology ==
=== Cortical stem cell growth ===
The FOXG1 protein is widely expressed in the brain and is crucial for cortical development (the process by which the cerebral cortex is formed in mammals). One of FOXG1's key functions is regulating the cell cycle of neural progenitor cells by promoting proliferation and preventing premature neural differentiation. Loss of FOXG1 results in a longer cell cycle and neural stem cells leave the cell cycle too early, leading to fewer new brain cells being made.

FOXG1 counteracts the FOXO/SMAD pathway, which normally stimulates cortical neuron differentiation. Through this counteraction, FOXG1 reduces the expression of p21, a low level of p21 contributes to the expansion of the neural stem cell pool and prevents early cell cycle exit.

=== Induction of cortical laminar subtypes by FOXG1 ===
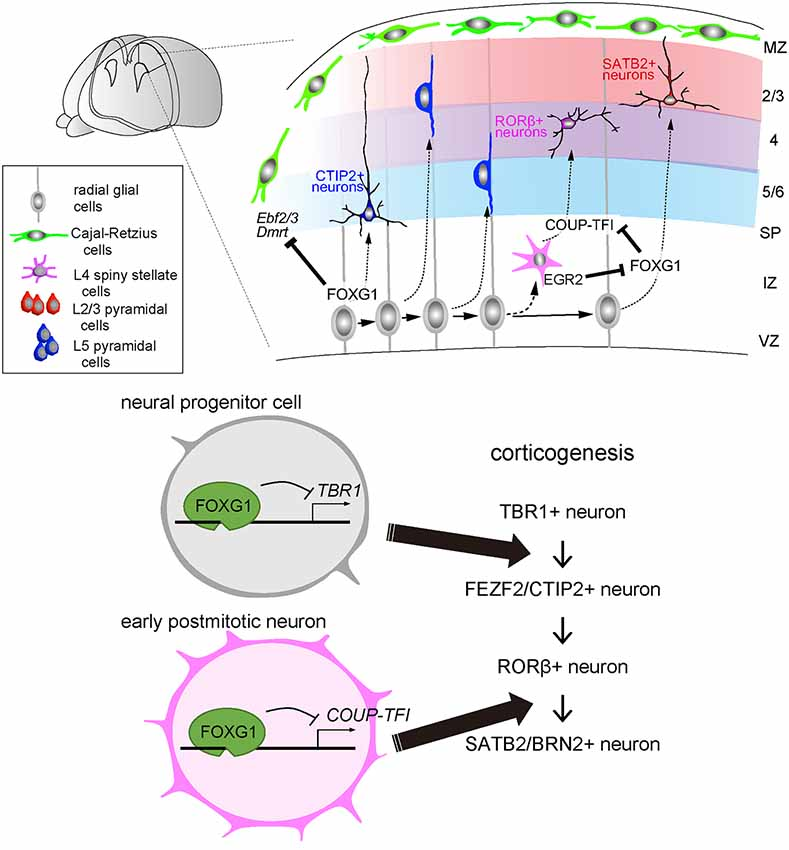
FOXG1 directs multiple laminar fate decisions during cerebrum development. During corticogenesis, cortical neurons are sequentially produced, migrate, and integrate into their destined layers. The onset of FOXG1 in progenitor cells halts the production of TBR1-expressing layer 1/6 neurons and switches to producing FEZF2/CTIP2-expressing layer 5 neurons. Later, in early postmitotic neurons, FOXG1 inhibits COUP-TFI, shifting neuronal production from RORβ-expressing layer 4 neurons to SATB2/BRN2-expressing layer 2/3 neurons.

Alongside the expansion of the progenitor cell pool through control of cell cycle regulators, the onset of FOXG1 expression in the forming forebrain activates a series of genetic and molecular processes in corticogenesis. FOXG1 is also involved in dorsoventral patterning (the process by which embryonic stem cells adopt different fates depending on their location) of the telencephalon, helping to establish future compartments and specify cell types through widespread changes in gene expression. Future compartments and specify cell types through widespread changes in gene expression. The activation of FOXG1 and the early patterning of the forebrain seems to be primarily maintained across vertebrates, where compartmentalization of the forebrain is established by cooperative interactions between morphogens and transcription factors. In the telencephalic territory, SIX3 expressed in the anterior neural plate, which competes with FOXG1 expression, whereby FGF8 which is expressed in the anterior neural ridge induces FOXG1 and helps to organize the telencephalic region.

When the telencephalon's compartments have been established, FOXG1 regulates neuron specification. Progenitor cells divide asymmetrically and begin producing TBR1-expressing neurons, which become layer 1 and layer 6 neurons at the surface and the deepest regions of the cortical plate. Progenitor cells further produce layer 5 FEZF2- and BCL11B/CTIP2-expressing corticospinal projection cells, followed by RORβ-expressing sensory input cells, and then layer 2/3 SATB2 and POU3F2/BRN2-expressing callosal projection neurons. These neurons merge into the cortical plate through an inside-out layering pattern, where more recently generated neurons migrate past those that were born earlier, settling in the surface region. Notably, while FOXG1 is expressed in many of the cortical progenitor cells and neurons, its function differs between subtypes and varies in a spatiotemporal manner (by progenitor cell proliferation and neuronal differentiation mechanism) (spatiotemporal gene expression is the process by which genes in particular organ tissues become active at particular stages of development) .

The onset of FOXG1 expression in progenitor cells ends the production of the earliest born neurons, in other words, Cajal-Retzius cells, through direct suppression of a major transcriptional network. This network comprises, as shown by transcriptome analysis and FOXG1-ChIP sequencing, TBR1, DMRTA1, EBF2, and EBF3.

The timely negative regulation of FOXG1 by EGR2, a target of TGFβ, occurs in the lower intermediate zone where cells are shifting out of the cell cycle, leading to the activation of Nr2f1/COUP-TFI, which enables layer 4 cell competence. In contrast, the absence of EGR2 target sites raises Foxg1 expression and paves the way for the development of SATB2/BRN2-positive callosal projection neurons (neurons which connect both brain hemispheres via corpus callosum). Since FOXG1 haploinsufficiency leads to agenesis of the corpus callosum in both humans and mice due to impaired upper-layer projection neuron development, these findings suggest that having two functional copies of the Foxg1 gene is essential for regulating the production of cortical neurons and the development of axons necessary for the formation of cortical circuits typical of FOXG1 disorders.

=== Role of FOXG1 in neural plasticity ===
According to one study, FOXG1 is expressed in both the region where neurogenesis takes place and differentiated neurons of the adult cerebral cortex, indicating its roles in cognitive skill and neural plasticity (neurogenesis is the process when new brain cells are formed). By altering the expression levels of FOXG1 in primary cultured neurons influences the development of dendrites, with increased levels of FOXG1 leading to increased dendritic length and branching of neurites, partly by positive regulatory mechanisms of HES1 and CREB1 gene expression.

In the adult hippocampus, a reduction in FOXG1 gene dosage results in a gradual decline in the quantity of dentate granule cells. In one study, the total elimination of Foxg1 in mature neurons was achieved through the use of an inducible Camk2α-CreER along with floxed Foxg1 mice. This deletion of Foxg1 led to impairments in spatial learning and memory, evaluated through the Morris water maze, in addition to a notable decrease in performance on both the contextual and cued fear conditioning tests.

Consequently, in FOXG1 syndrome, these mechanism (as mentioned above) are disrupted.

== Treatment ==
This disease doesn't have a cure, but some of the symptoms can be managed. A multidisciplinary team is generally employed to treat the person's symptoms during their lifetime. The team might include specialist in: neurogenetics, genetic counseling, rehabilitation medicine, orthopedics, gastroenterology, physical therapy and ophthalmology.

Seizures can be managed or mitigated by antiseizure medication (ASMs), common ASMs include clobazam, valproic acid, vigabatrin, felbamate, lamotrigine and steroids. Although, there isn't universal treatment of the seizures in FOXG1 syndrome.

Dyskinetic movement disorder can be managed through anti-dyskinetic medications (for example: pimozide, tetrabenazine, clonidine, etc), Although no single drug has been found to be effective for this disorder.

Physical therapy is useful to make muscle tone better, it is also useful for strength improvement.

== Research ==
In 2024, there was a study, where postnatal mouse was injected with AAV9-FOXG1 via ICV injection, and results showed improvement in corpus callosum agenesis, also it showed recovery of the dentate gyrus morphology, increased oligodendrocyte numbers with myelin restoration.

== Prognosis ==
Information regarding the long-term course of FOXG1 syndrome is limited, and it is unclear whether lifespan is affected or not. One of the oldest individuals with the disorder is 42 years old (at the time of article publication).

== History ==
Thee first case of FOXG1 was identified by Shoichet et al in 7-year old female, who had de-novo translocation between chromosome 2 and chromosome 14, which affected FOXG1 gene. Later, in 2008, Ariani et al. identified 2 female patients (First was 22 years and second one was 7 years old, at the time of article publication) with FOXG1 syndrome, although at the time of publication, it was named "Rett syndrome, congenital variant", because of similiraties between Rett syndrome and FOXG1 syndrome. But in 2011, Kortüm F et al. designated the name "FOXG1 syndrome", because of the symptomatic differences between Rett syndrome and FOXG1 syndrome.

== See also ==
- Rett syndrome
- CDKL5 deficiency disorder
