= CDKL5 =

Protein-coding gene in humans

Identifiers
- Aliases: CDKL5, EIEE2, ISSX, STK9, CFAP247, cyclin dependent kinase like 5, DEE2
- External IDs: OMIM: 300203; MGI: 1278336; GeneCards: CDKL5
Available structures
| PDB | Ortholog search: PDBe RCSB |
| PDB | List of PDB id codes 4BGQ |
Enzyme activity
| EC # | BRENDA | ExPASy | KEGG | MetaCyc |
|---|---|---|---|---|
| 2.7.11.22 | ↗ | ↗ | ↗ | ↗ |

Gene location (Human)
| Chr. | X chromosome (human) |
| Band | Xp22.13 | Start | 18,425,583 bp |
| Band | Xp22.13 | End | 18,653,629 bp |

Gene location (Mouse)
| Chr. | X chromosome (mouse) |
| Band | X F4|X 73.95 cM | Start | 159,554,919 bp |
| Band | X F4|X 73.95 cM | End | 159,777,700 bp |
RNA expression pattern
| Bgee | Human / Mouse (ortholog); Top expressed in: frontal pole; Brodmann area 23; lateral nuclear group of thalamus; middle temporal gyrus; endothelial cell; palpebral conjunctiva; primary visual cortex; superior frontal gyrus; entorhinal cortex; visceral pleura / Top expressed in: medial dorsal nucleus; medial geniculate nucleus; primary motor cortex; lateral geniculate nucleus; lateral septal nucleus; cingulate gyrus; piriform cortex; Region I of hippocampus proper; prefrontal cortex; olfactory tubercle; More reference expression data |
| BioGPS | n/a |
Gene ontology
| Molecular function | transferase activity; protein kinase activity; nucleotide binding; kinase activity; protein serine/threonine kinase activity; ATP binding; cyclin-dependent protein serine/threonine kinase activity |
| Cellular component | dendritic growth cone; nucleoplasm; ruffle membrane; nucleus; cytosol; dendrite cytoplasm; synapse; perinuclear region of cytoplasm; centrosome; ciliary basal body; ciliary tip; cytoplasm; microtubule organizing center; cytoskeleton; cell projection; glutamatergic synapse; postsynaptic density, intracellular component |
| Biological process | phosphorylation; neuron migration; protein phosphorylation; positive regulation of GTPase activity; positive regulation of dendrite morphogenesis; protein autophosphorylation; positive regulation of axon extension; regulation of dendrite development; positive regulation of dendritic spine development; regulation of cilium assembly; regulation of cell cycle; regulation of postsynapse organization |
Sources:Amigo / QuickGO
Orthologs
| Databases | NCBI: entry; OMA: entry |
| Species | Human | Mouse |
| Entrez | 6792 | 382253 |
| Ensembl | ENSG00000008086 | ENSMUSG00000031292 |
| UniProt | O76039 | Q3UTQ8 |
| RefSeq (mRNA) | NM_001037343; NM_003159; NM_001323289 | NM_001024624 |
| RefSeq (protein) | NP_001032420; NP_001310218; NP_003150 | NP_001019795 |
| Location (UCSC) | Chr X: 18.43 – 18.65 Mb | Chr X: 159.55 – 159.78 Mb |
| PubMed search |
- Wikidata
| View/Edit Human | View/Edit Mouse |

Cyclin-dependent kinase-like 5 (CDKL5) is a serine/threonine protein kinase that in humans is encoded by the CDKL5 gene. It is critically involved in early brain development and function, particularly in neuronal maturation and synaptic regulation. Mutations in CDKL5 are associated with CDKL5 deficiency disorder (CDD), a severe neurodevelopmental condition that manifests with early-onset epilepsy, developmental delay, and motor and cognitive impairment. CDKL5 is closely related to the cyclin-dependent kinase family and has been implicated in disorders such as Rett syndrome and other epileptic encephalopathies.

== Gene ==
The CDKL5 gene is located on the X chromosome at locus Xp22. It undergoes alternative splicing to produce multiple transcript variants. Pathogenic variants in CDKL5 can result in either loss of function or altered subcellular localization of the protein, which contributes to disease pathology. The gene is expressed predominantly in the brain and is particularly active during early developmental stages.

== Structure ==
CDKL5 encodes a serine/threonine kinase with a highly conserved catalytic domain similar to cyclin-dependent kinases (CDKs), though it functions independently of cyclins. The C-terminal region of the protein plays a critical role in its subcellular localization and regulation. During neuronal development, CDKL5 localizes to both the nucleus and cytoplasm, with nuclear localization being essential for its role in gene regulation and splicing.

== Function ==
CDKL5 plays a central role in neuronal function by regulating signal transduction pathways that influence dendritic spine morphology, synaptogenesis, and neuronal survival. It is involved in the phosphorylation of target proteins that modulate neuronal activity and gene expression. CDKL5 has also been shown to interact with nuclear speckles and influence RNA splicing machinery, which may underlie some of its neurodevelopmental functions.

== Clinical significance ==
Mutations in CDKL5 cause CDKL5 deficiency disorder (CDD), an X-linked dominant condition characterized by early-onset epileptic seizures, severe intellectual disability, and motor dysfunction. CDD is considered distinct from classic Rett syndrome, although overlapping features have been noted, especially in female patients. Clinical presentations of CDKL5 mutations can vary widely, and cases have been reported in both males and females. Genetic testing for CDKL5 is recommended in infants presenting with epileptic encephalopathy of unknown origin. Research is ongoing into potential therapies, including gene therapy and molecular modulation of downstream targets.

== See also ==
- Cyclin-dependent kinase
- Rett syndrome
- West syndrome
- CDKL5 deficiency disorder
