= TSHA-102 =

Experimental gene therapy

TSHA-102 is an experimental gene therapy developed by Taysha Gene Therapies for Rett syndrome, delivered via adeno-associated virus serotype 9.
