= JARID1B =

Protein found in humans

KDM5B

Identifiers
- Aliases: KDM5B, CT31, JARID1B, PLU-1, PLU1, PPP1R98, PUT1, RBBP2H1A, RBP2-H1, lysine demethylase 5B, MRT65
- External IDs: OMIM: 605393; MGI: 1922855; GeneCards: KDM5B
Available structures
PDB	Ortholog search: PDBe RCSB
PDB	List of PDB id codes 2MA5, 2MNY, 2MNZ, 5A1F, 5A3N, 5A3P, 5A3T, 5A3W, 5FPL, 5FPU, 5FV3, 5FZ6, 5FUP, 5FUN, 5FZK, 5FYZ, 5FZ7, 5FZ9, 5FYU, 5FZB, 5FZC, 5FYT, 5FZ0, 5FYY, 5FZ1, 5FZ3, 5FZL, 5FZA, 5FZ4
Enzyme activity
EC #	BRENDA	ExPASy	KEGG	MetaCyc
1.14.11.67	↗	↗	↗	↗

Gene location (Human)
Chr.	Chromosome 1 (human)
Band	1q32.1	Start	202,724,495 bp
Band	1q32.1	End	202,808,487 bp

Gene location (Mouse)
Chr.	Chromosome 1 (mouse)
Band	1 E4|1 58.24 cM	Start	134,487,909 bp
Band	1 E4|1 58.24 cM	End	134,563,023 bp
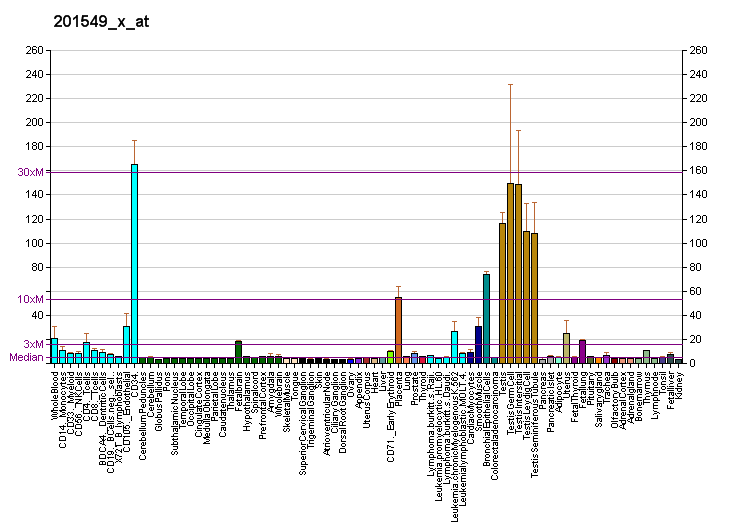

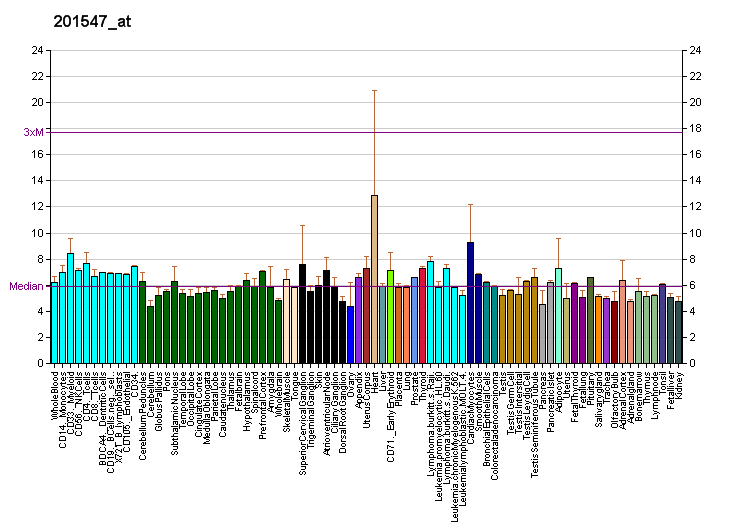

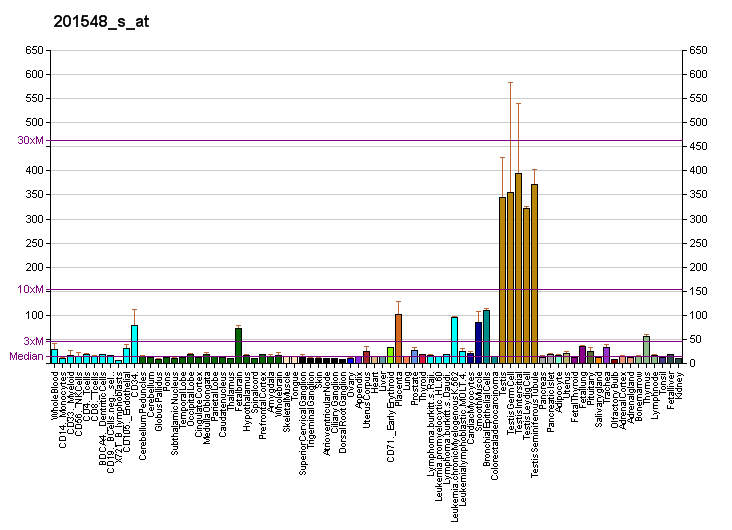
RNA expression pattern
Bgee	Human / Mouse (ortholog); Top expressed in: sperm; left testis; right testis; ganglionic eminence; ventricular zone; epithelium of colon; testicle; gonad; skin of thigh; cartilage tissue / Top expressed in: Rostral migratory stream; spermatocyte; maxillary prominence; mandibular prominence; spermatid; molar; internal carotid artery; ganglionic eminence; abdominal wall; Gonadal ridge; More reference expression data
BioGPS	More reference expression data
Gene ontology
Molecular function	DNA binding; transcription corepressor activity; DNA-binding transcription factor activity; dioxygenase activity; metal ion binding; protein binding; oxidoreductase activity; histone demethylase activity; histone H3-tri/di/monomethyl-lysine-4 demethylase activity; sequence-specific double-stranded DNA binding; histone H3-methyl-lysine-4 demethylase activity; histone binding; zinc ion binding; DNA-binding transcription factor activity, RNA polymerase II-specific; DNA-binding transcription repressor activity, RNA polymerase II-specific; chromatin binding; methylated histone binding
Cellular component	nucleoplasm; nucleus; cytosol; histone methyltransferase complex
Biological process	response to fungicide; positive regulation of mammary gland epithelial cell proliferation; regulation of transcription, DNA-templated; branching involved in mammary gland duct morphogenesis; uterus morphogenesis; rhythmic process; regulation of estradiol secretion; post-embryonic development; cellular response to fibroblast growth factor stimulus; transcription, DNA-templated; single fertilization; mammary duct terminal end bud growth; positive regulation of gene expression; lens fiber cell differentiation; negative regulation of transcription, DNA-templated; histone H3-K4 demethylation, trimethyl-H3-K4-specific; regulation of transcription by RNA polymerase II; histone H3-K4 demethylation; cellular response to leukemia inhibitory factor; chromatin organization; negative regulation of transcription by RNA polymerase II; chromatin remodeling
Sources:Amigo / QuickGO
Orthologs
Databases	NCBI: entry; OMA: entry
Species	Human	Mouse
Entrez	10765	75605
Ensembl	ENSG00000117139	ENSMUSG00000042207
UniProt	Q9UGL1	Q80Y84
RefSeq (mRNA)	NM_001314042; NM_006618; NM_001347591; NM_001399817	NM_152895
RefSeq (protein)	NP_001300971; NP_001334520; NP_006609	NP_690855
Location (UCSC)	Chr 1: 202.72 – 202.81 Mb	Chr 1: 134.49 – 134.56 Mb
PubMed search
- Wikidata
View/Edit Human	View/Edit Mouse

Lysine-specific demethylase 5B also known as histone demethylase JARID1B is a demethylase enzyme that in humans is encoded by the KDM5B gene. JARID1B belongs to the alpha-ketoglutarate-dependent hydroxylase superfamily.

== Function ==
Jarid1B (also known as KDM5B or PLU1) is in the family of JHDM genes. These are responsible for demethylation of tri- and di-methylated lysines in the 4 position of histone 3 (H3K4me3 and H3K4me2). Jarid1B is a multidomain enzyme that is part of the subfamily KDM5. The whole Jarid1 family is a protein family that possesses H3K4 histone demethylase activity.

Jarid1B has been implicated in the development of prostate, breast, and skin cancer and also has been associated with melanoma maintenance. Knockout mice (Jarid1b−/−) produced are viable in neonatal life. These mice do exhibit the phenotype of premature mortality, decreased fertility in female mice, reduction in body weight and impairment in mammary gland development. It also acted to decrease serum estrogen levels and caused reduced mammary epithelial cell proliferation in the early stages of puberty. These Jarid1b−/− mice seem to be greatly affected in many regulators of the development of mammy development such as FOXA1 and estrogen receptor α. However, others have shown that a Jarid1B knockout embryos usually have neonatal lethality due to the failure of their respiratory system. Knockout embryos have also been seen to have several different neural defects including: disorganized cranial nerves, increased incidences of exencephaly, and defects in eye development.

== Interactions ==
JARID1B has been shown to interact with FOXG1 and PAX9.
