= FOXG1 =

Protein-coding gene in the species Homo sapiens

Identifiers
- Aliases: FOXG1, BF1, BF2, FHKL3, FKH2, FKHL1, FKHL2, FKHL3, FKHL4, FOXG1A, FOXG1B, FOXG1C, HBF-1, HBF-2, HBF-3, HBF-G2, HBF2, HFK1, HFK2, HFK3, KHL2, QIN, forkhead box G1
- External IDs: OMIM: 164874; MGI: 1347464; GeneCards: FOXG1

Gene location (Human)
Chr.	Chromosome 14 (human)
Band	14q12	Start	28,766,787 bp
Band	14q12	End	28,770,277 bp

Gene location (Mouse)
Chr.	Chromosome 12 (mouse)
Band	12 B3|12 21.78 cM	Start	49,429,443 bp
Band	12 B3|12 21.78 cM	End	49,433,644 bp
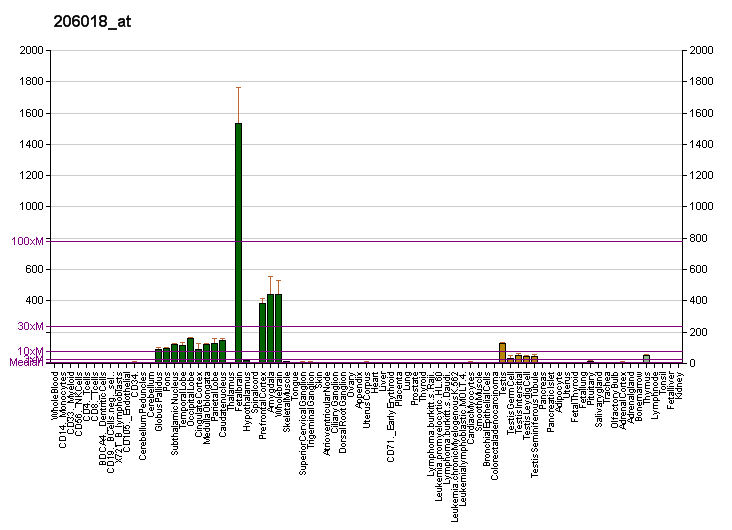

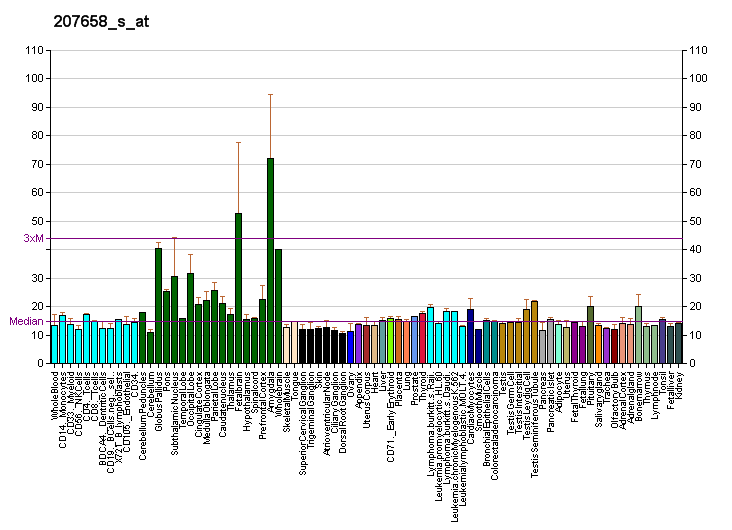
RNA expression pattern
Bgee	Human / Mouse (ortholog); Top expressed in: endothelial cell; Brodmann area 23; ganglionic eminence; Region I of hippocampus proper; ventricular zone; middle temporal gyrus; orbitofrontal cortex; entorhinal cortex; Brodmann area 46; postcentral gyrus / Top expressed in: ganglionic eminence; medial ganglionic eminence; ventricular zone; subiculum; nucleus accumbens; olfactory tubercle; Rostral migratory stream; lateral septal nucleus; anterior amygdaloid area; prefrontal cortex; More reference expression data
BioGPS	More reference expression data
Gene ontology
Molecular function	DNA-binding transcription factor activity; DNA binding; sequence-specific DNA binding; protein binding; DNA-binding transcription factor activity, RNA polymerase II-specific
Cellular component	nucleus; nucleoplasm
Biological process	multicellular organism development; ageing; brain development; negative regulation of transcription, DNA-templated; regulation of transcription, DNA-templated; transcription, DNA-templated; anatomical structure morphogenesis; cell differentiation; negative regulation of transcription by RNA polymerase II; positive regulation of neuroblast proliferation; regulation of mitotic cell cycle; dorsal/ventral pattern formation; regulation of gene expression; axon midline choice point recognition; pyramidal neuron migration to cerebral cortex; central nervous system neuron development; cerebral cortex development; neurogenesis; forebrain development; inner ear morphogenesis; negative regulation of neuron differentiation; positive regulation of neuron differentiation; positive regulation of cell cycle; neuron fate determination; cell morphogenesis involved in neuron differentiation; regulation of cell cycle; regulation of neural precursor cell proliferation; regulation of transcription by RNA polymerase II
Sources:Amigo / QuickGO
Orthologs
Databases	NCBI: entry; OMA: entry
Species	Human	Mouse
Entrez	2290	15228
Ensembl	ENSG00000176165	ENSMUSG00000020950
UniProt	P55316	Q60987
RefSeq (mRNA)	NM_005249	NM_001160112; NM_008241
RefSeq (protein)	NP_005240	NP_001153584; NP_032267
Location (UCSC)	Chr 14: 28.77 – 28.77 Mb	Chr 12: 49.43 – 49.43 Mb
PubMed search
- Wikidata
View/Edit Human	View/Edit Mouse

Forkhead box protein G1 is a protein that in humans is encoded by the FOXG1 gene.

== Function ==
This gene belongs to the forkhead family of transcription factors that is characterized by a distinct forkhead domain. The complete function of this gene has not yet been determined; however, it has been shown to play a role in the development of the brain and telencephalon. Mutations of FOXG1 are the cause of FoxG1 syndrome.

== Associated disorders ==
FOXG1 syndrome is characterized by microcephaly and brain malformations. It affects most aspects of development and can cause seizures. FOXG1 syndrome is classified as an autism spectrum disorder and was previously considered a variant of Rett syndrome.

== Interactions ==
FOXG1 has been shown to interact with JARID1B.

== See also ==
- FOX proteins
