= Soticlestat =

Cholesterol 24-hydroxylase inhibitor

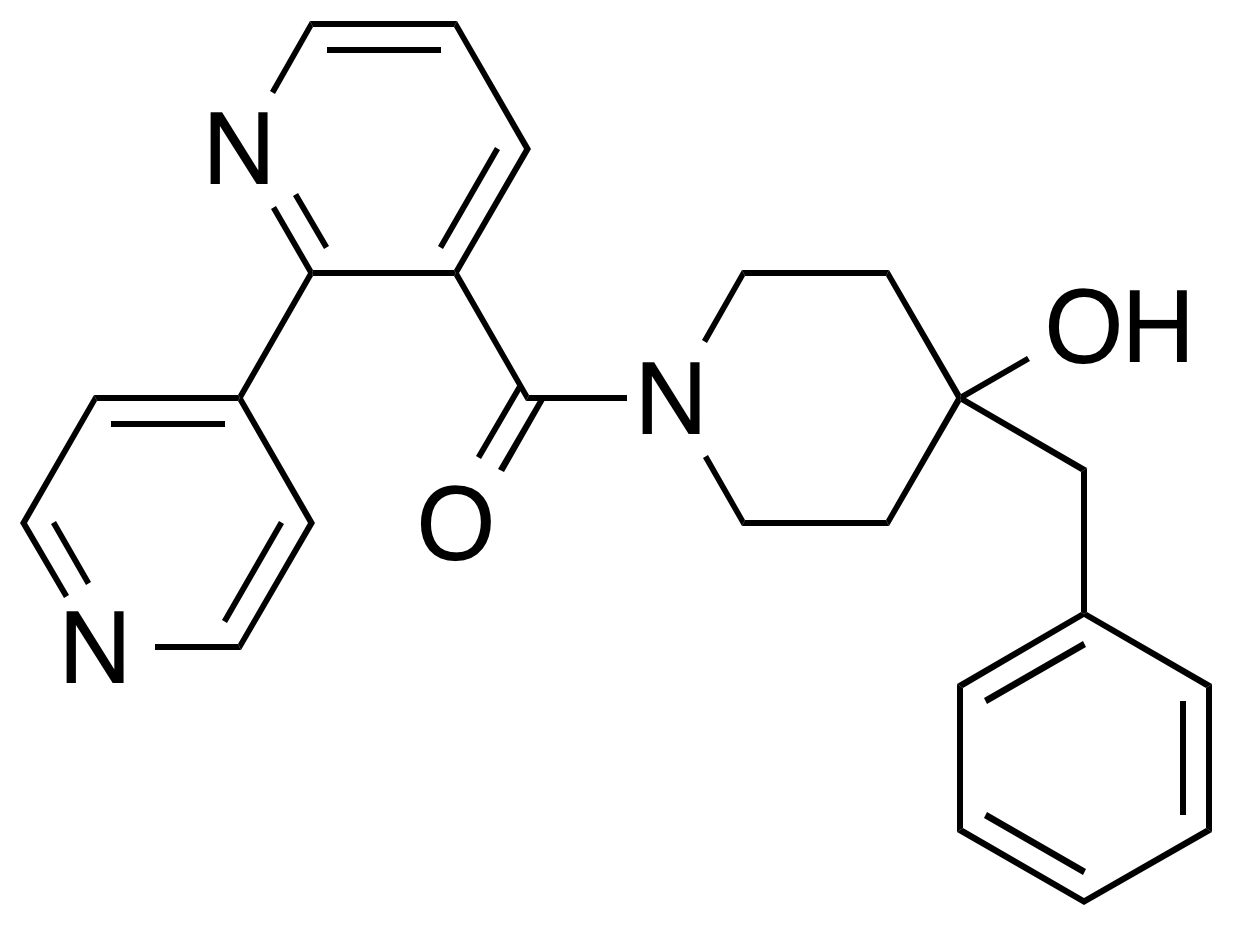

Clinical data
- Other names: TAK-935; OV-935
- Routes of administration: By mouth

Identifiers
- IUPAC name: (4-benzyl-4-hydroxypiperidin-1-yl)-(2-pyridin-4-ylpyridin-3-yl)methanone
- CAS Number: 1429505-03-2
- PubChem CID: 73437845
- ChemSpider: 68007185
- UNII: 1766MU795L
- KEGG: D11590
- ChEMBL: ChEMBL4298172

Chemical and physical data
- Formula: C_{23}H_{23}N_{3}O_{2}
- Molar mass: 373.456 g·mol^{−1}
- 3D model (JSmol): Interactive image
- SMILES: C1CN(CCC1(CC2=CC=CC=C2)O)C(=O)C3=C(N=CC=C3)C4=CC=NC=C4
- InChI: InChI=1S/C23H23N3O2/c27-22(20-7-4-12-25-21(20)19-8-13-24-14-9-19)26-15-10-23(28,11-16-26)17-18-5-2-1-3-6-18/h1-9,12-14,28H,10-11,15-17H2; Key:XKUZMIUSBMCVPP-UHFFFAOYSA-N

Soticlestat (developmental code names TAK-935, OV-935) is an experimental anticonvulsant and cholesterol 24-hydroxylase inhibitor being investigated as a treatment for Dravet syndrome, Lennox–Gastaut syndrome, tuberous sclerosis complex, dup15q syndrome, and CDKL5 deficiency disorder. The development rights to the drug were purchased by Takeda Pharmaceuticals from Ovid Therapeutics in 2021. In January 2025, Takeda announced they were halting development of the drug.

Soticlestat was designated as an orphan drug by the FDA in 2017 for the treatment for both Dravet syndrome and Lennox–Gastaut syndrome.

== Mechanism of action ==
Soticlestat functions by blocking cholesterol 24-hydroxylase (CH24H, also known as CYP46A1), an enzyme in the brain that converts cholesterol to the oxysterol 24S-hydroxycholesterol (24S-HC). Reduction of 24S-HC has been shown to reduce glutamatergic signaling, which reduces seizures. Soticlestat may also have neuroprotective and anti-inflammatory properties via glial cell modulation.

== Clinical trials ==
Soticlestat has been assessed in clinical trials for refractory epilepsy associated with Dravet syndrome and Lennox–Gastaut syndrome. The Phase 2 ELEKTRA study indicated that soticlestat was well tolerated and reduced seizure frequency.

In the Phase 3 SKYLINE clinical study, Takadea reported that topline data showed soticlestat plus standard of care narrowly missed its primary endpoint of reducing convulsive seizure frequency in patients with Dravet syndrome. However, it demonstrated clinically significant effects on several key secondary endpoints, including responder rates and measures of caregiver and clinician global perceptions of improvement. In the separate Phase 3 SKYWAY trial, soticlestat did not meet its primary endpoint of reducing major motor drop seizures in Lennox–Gastaut syndrome. Both studies reported a favorable safety and tolerability profile for soticlestat.
