= Hypodontia =

Developmental absence of some teeth

- Pronunciation: hi-po-don-ti-ia
- Specialty: Dentistry
- Types: 1
- Causes: Environmental or genetic. Can be isolated or associated with syndromes such as ectodermal dysplasia and Down syndrome.
- Diagnostic method: Dental panoramic tomograph screening, no earlier than 9 years of age
- Prevention: n/a
- Treatment: Prevention of tooth loss through caries, periodontal disease and trauma; Multidisciplinary approach with paediatric, orthodontic and restorative specialties; Management varies with stage of dental development

Hypodontia is defined as the developmental absence of one or more teeth excluding the third molars. It is one of the most common dental anomalies, and can have a negative impact on function, and also appearance. It rarely occurs in primary teeth (also known as deciduous, milk, first and baby teeth) and the most commonly affected are the adult second premolars and the upper lateral incisors. It usually occurs as part of a syndrome that involves other abnormalities and requires multidisciplinary treatment.

The phenomenon can be subdivided into the following according to the number of teeth concerned:

1. Hypodontia: one to six missing teeth excluding the third molars
2. Oligodontia: six or more missing permanent teeth excluding the third molars
3. Anodontia: complete absence of teeth

== Signs and symptoms ==
Typically, all baby teeth will be present by the age of three. As for all adult teeth, they erupt between the ages 6 to 14, with the exception of the third molar, also known as the wisdom teeth which normally erupt between 17 and 25 years of age. If the tooth has yet to erupt by an appropriate age, panoramic x-rays are taken.

=== Dental features ===
Microdontia may be present in one or more of the other teeth. This means that the teeth appear smaller than normal, may be observed in both the primary and permanent dentition. This condition can be genetically-linked and in severe cases, may present themselves in the form of ectodermal dysplasia, cleft lip or palate or Down syndrome. A delay in tooth development may also serve as an indication, whereby the absence of an adult successor slows down the normal resorption of the roots of the baby teeth, which is the progressive loss of parts of the tooth.

Misplaced (ectopic) positioning of the adult teeth may be discovered upon examination or a radiograph. One of the consequences may be an adult tooth intercepting with a baby tooth, causing premature loss or wrong positioning. This can be due to either the absence of neighboring teeth acting as a guide during eruption or the lack of space in the jaw for them to erupt into because of malocclusion.

=== Skeletal features ===
Several studies have discovered that anteriorly missing teeth can accompany retrognathic maxilla, also known as an underbite, prognathic mandible, where the lower jaw protrudes out more than normal, and smaller posterior cranial base length. Occurrence of hypodontia can be associated with reduced anterior lower facial height and lip protrusion. This can be linked to lower maxillary to mandibular plane angles.

A more acute mandibular angle and flatter chin may develop as a result. These characteristics become more prominent as the condition becomes progressively severe, particularly when more than one tooth is missing.

=== Other dental and radiographic features ===
Data derived from principal component analysis of radiographic images show that children with mild hypodontia may display significant increase of the interincisal angle and decrease in the maxillary and mandibular incisor angles.

Cephalometric tracing is commonly used to study a patient's dentofacial proportions in the craniofacial complex. This can aid in predicting growth changes, allowing dentists, especially orthodontists, to develop a suitable treatment plan. Coupled with that, findings consistent among individuals include:

1. Anterior hypodontia associated with hyper divergent craniofacial pattern;
2. A tendency toward a class III malocclusion identified in maxillary hypodontia, and;
3. Reduced lower posterior facial height in children with posterior and mandibular hypodontia.

=== Associated anomalies ===
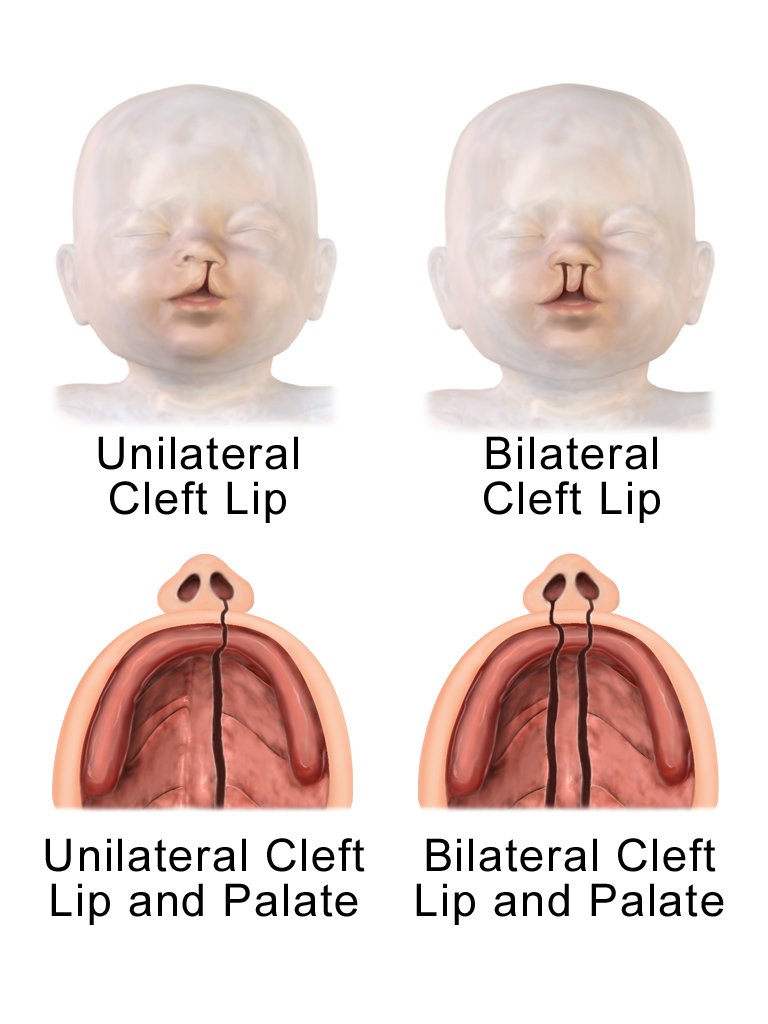
Illustration of cleft lip and palate

1. Reduction in coronal or radical dimensions
2. Retained primary teeth
3. Ectopic canine eruption
4. Abnormal morphology such as peg-shaped maxillary lateral incisors and taurodontism, characterized by an enlarged tooth body and roots that are reduced in size
5. Extracted teeth

== Cause ==
Several theories regarding the aetiology of hypodontia have been proposed in existing literature. There have been various theories mostly looking into genetic and environmental aspects and how they may both be involved. However, the exact cause remains unclear. The extent of individual influences of genetic and environmental factors is still widely debated.

Theories regarding the mechanism through which hypodontia occurs can be categorised into evolutional or anatomical.

Preliminary studies focused on an evolutionary approach which suggested shortening of the intermaxillary complex and thus shorter arches may contribute to a decrease in number of teeth. This was also suggested in 1945 by Dahlberg using Butler's Field Theory that focused on evolution and development of mammalian teeth into human dentition in an attempt to analyse different of agenesis. In each jaw, four morphological sites were identified (incisors, canines, premolars and molars). The tooth at the end of each region was less genetically stable and hence more prone to absence. In contrast, the tooth most mesial in each region seemed to be more genetically stable. A subsequent theory hypothesised the teeth at the end of each region were possibly "vestigial bodies" that became obsolete during the evolutionary process. At present, it has been theorised that evolutionary change is working to decrease the human dentition by the loss of an incisor, premolar and molar in each quadrant. According to Vastardis (2000), the size of jaws and number of teeth seem to decrease along with human evolution.

Theories focusing on anatomical principle, hypothesised that specific areas of the dental lamina are especially prone to environmental effects during tooth maturation. Svinhufvud et al. (1988) suggested that teeth that were more prone to absence developed in areas of initial fusion of the jaw. For instance, maxillary lateral incisors originate where the lateral maxillae and medial nasal bone processes fuse. In contrast, Kjaer et al. (1994) suggested regions where innervation developed were more sensitive than areas of fusion. Commonly affected regions were found to undergo innervation last, this might imply the developmental relationship between nerve and hard tissue. It is thought to be local nerve development that affects tooth agenesis rather than global development, as brainstem anomalies have not been seen to affect tooth development.

Presently, the role of polygenic and environmental factors on hypodontia is recognised in most theories.

=== Environmental factors ===
Environmental factors can be classified into two main groups, invasive and non-invasive. These factors act additively or independently, ultimately affecting positioning and physical development of the tooth.

Invasive environmental factors potentially affect tooth development and positioning leading to hypodontia and impaction. Examples include jaw fractures, surgical procedures and extraction of the preceding deciduous tooth. Treatment such as irradiation has been shown to have severe effects on developing teeth. In a smaller capacity, chemotherapy was also found to have a similar effect. Thalidomide (N-phthaloylglutamine) was also discovered to have a causative effect on mothers who took the drug during pregnancy, resulting in congenitally missing teeth in their children. A link was found between systemic diseases, endocrine disruption (i.e. idiopathic hypoparathyroidism and pseudohypoparathyroidism) and ectodermal dysplasia. However, a definite etiological relationship has yet to be established. Examples of infections include rubella and candida. Exposure to PCBs (such as dioxin), allergies, and toxic epidermal necrolysis following a drug reaction may also be contributing factors.

In a recent study assessing environmental risk factors for hypodontia, it was established that maternal smoking does play a causative role in hypodontia. Passive smoking and caffeine were also assessed but showed no statistical significance.

The Journal of the American Dental Association published preliminary data suggesting a statistical association between hypodontia of the permanent teeth and epithelial ovarian cancer (EOC). The study shows that women with EOC are 8.1 times more likely to have hypodontia than are women without EOC. The suggestion therefore is that hypodontia can serve as a "marker" for potential risk of EOC in women.

=== Genetics ===
Genetic causes also involve the genes MSX1 and PAX9.

Genetic associations for selective tooth agenesis ("STHAG") include:

Type	OMIM	Gene	Locus
STHAG1	106600	MSX1	4p16
STHAG2	602639	?	16q12
STHAG3	604625	PAX9	14q12
STHAG4	150400	WNT10A	2q35
STHAG5	610926	?	10q11
STHAG6	613097	LTBP3	11q12
STHAGX1	313500	EDA	Xq13.1

Failure of tooth formation due to disturbances during the early stages of development could be the cause of congenital missing teeth; this is also known as tooth agenesis. A variety of studies show that missing teeth are commonly associated with genetic and environmental factors. Some literature also shows that a combination of both factors may contribute to the occurrence of hypodontia.

Most craniofacial characteristics are influenced by both genetic and environmental factors through complex interactions. The variable expressivity of traits can be either completely genetically determined, environmentally determined, or both. That genetics plays an important role in hypodontia is shown in many different cases. There are hundreds of genes expressed and involved in regulating tooth morphogenesis. Although a single gene defect may contribute to hypodontia, more studies propose that hypodontia is the result of one or more points of closely linked genetic mutations, or polygenic defects.

The pattern of congenitally missing teeth seen in monozygotic twins is different, suggesting an underlying epigenetic factor, which may be due to the simultaneous occurrence of two anomalies. This multifactorial aetiology involves environmental factors which trigger the genetic anomalies, resulting in the occurrence of dental agenesis. Common environmental factors include infection, trauma and drugs which predispose to the condition. In hereditary cases, evidence of dental germ developing after surrounding tissues have closed the space required for development may be a large contributing factor, as well as such genetic disorders as Down syndrome, ectodermal dysplasia, cleidocranial dysplasia, and cleft lip and cleft palate.

==== MSX1 ====
MSX1 (muscle segment homeobox 1) is involved in condensation of ectomesenchyme in the tooth germ. Among the members of homeobox genes, MSX1 and MSX2 are crucial in mediating direct epithelial-mesenchymal interactions during tooth development by expressing in regions of condensing ectomesenchyme in the tooth germ. MSX1 mutations have been identified as a contributing factor in missing second premolars, third molars, and a small percentage of first molars. MSX1 is less likely to cause anterior agenesis.

Heterozygous mutations in PAX9 (paired box gene 9) could arrest tooth morphogenesis as it plays a role of transcription the gene expressed in tooth mesenchyme at the bud stage during tooth development. A study showed that single nucleotide polymorphisms in PAX9 were highly associated with missing upper lateral incisors.

==== AXIN2 ====
The AXIN2 (AXIS inhibition protein 2) gene is a negative regulator of the Wnt signalling pathway, which is important in regulating cell fate, proliferation, differentiation and apoptosis. Its polymorphic variant may be associated with hypodontia such as missing lower incisors or in a more severe form of agenesis like oligontia (lack of six or more permanent teeth).

==== EDA ====
EDA provides instructions for making a protein called ectodysplasin A. It encodes transmembrane protein that is part of TNF (tumour necrosis factor) family of ligands. EDA gene defects cause ectodermal dysplasia, which is also known as X-linked hypohidrotic ectodermal dysplasia. Common dental features of ectodermal dysplasia are multiple missing teeth and microdontia.

PAX9 and TGFA are involved in regulating between MSX1 and PAX9, causing hypodontia of the molars.

Hypodontia can be found in isolated cases too. The familiar or sporadic type of isolations are more frequently reported than the syndromic type. Isolated cases of autosomal dominant, autosomal recessive, or X-linked inheritance patterns may have an impact on the isolation conditions in expressing variation of both penetration and expressivity of traits. Mutations in MSX, PAX9 and TGFA genes are known to cause congenitally missing teeth in some racial groups.

== Research ==
In the 1960s and 1970s, several studies were conducted sponsored by the U.S. Atomic Energy Commission, with the aim of finding a link between genetics and hypodontia.

== Impact ==
There are numerous studies and research reports on the prevalence, aetiology, and treatment of hypodontia and the dentoskeletal effect of hypodontia. A few studies have investigated Oral Health-related Quality of Life (OHRQoL) in individuals with hypodontia and provided some evidence that hypodontia may have an impact on quality of life.

=== Psychosocial ===
Cosmetic dentistry has become more notable and prevalent in modern society. Interpersonal relationships and perceived qualities, such as intelligence, friendliness, social class, and popularity can be affected by dentofacial appearance. Some studies have shown that the extent of complaints made by patients was associated with the severity of the condition and the number of missing permanent teeth.

Meta-analyses and theoretical reviews have demonstrated that attractive children are seen by others as more intelligent and exhibit more positive social behaviour and traits, other than receiving much more positive treatment than their less attractive counterparts. Therefore, a divergence from perceived ideal dentofacial aesthetic, particularly in children, might adversely affect self-esteem and self-confidence besides attracting mockery from peers.

It is therefore reasonable to theorize that deviations from "normal" or "ideal" dentofacial aesthetic could be destructive to an individual's psychosocial and emotional well-being, which brings upon some psychosocial distress in that individual as a result of their condition.

=== Functional ===
Individuals with hypodontia tend to have deeper bites and spaces. Further deepening of the bite can also be seen on individuals with missing posterior teeth. Apart from that, hypodontia may lead to non-working interferences, poor gingival contours and over-eruptions of the opposing teeth.

It has been found that individuals with hypodontia experience more difficulty during mastication or functioning movements due to smaller occlusal table available. A recent cross-sectional study showed that hypodontia patients have more difficulties in chewing, especially if the deciduous teeth associated with the missing permanent teeth had been exfoliated. Despite currently limited evidence to support this statement, it is plausible that hypodontia may pose functional limitations, which eventually affect that individual's general well-being and quality of life.

Hypodontia can indeed pose limitations on the chewing ability of a patient. The condition can be associated with split in the upper lips – a condition known as oral cleft. Hypodontia can have impacts on speech, aesthetics and function of muscles in the mouth. As a result, hypodontia can have negative impacts on the quality of life, although the condition can be well managed and treated by dentists and orthodontists. To manage the condition, the patient will need to have long-term orthodontic treatment.

=== Financial ===
Patient with hypodontia requires careful treatment plan due to complex case in order to ensure the best treatment outcomes. Such treatment plans require multi-disciplinary approach, which usually come at a financial cost to both patient and possibly their family. Due to this reason, a team consists of different dental specialties is involved in the patient care.

== Management ==
Hypodontia is a condition that can present in various ways with differing severities. This results in a wide range of treatment methods available. Those affected should be allowed to consider and select the most suitable option for themselves. Early diagnosis of hypodontia is critical for treatment success. The treatment of hypodontia involves specialists in departments such as oral and maxillofacial surgery, operative dentistry, pediatric dentistry, orthodontics and prosthodontics.

Before determining a treatment plan, the following should be determined:

- Evaluate the number of teeth missing
- The size and number of remaining teeth in both arches
- Malocclusion
- Facial profile
- Bone volume
- Age: Definitive treatment for hypodontia only commences once all permanent teeth erupt, or upon the completion of orthodontic treatment
- Primary teeth condition
- Patient's motivation towards treatment

Traditionally, the management of hypodontia has involved replacing missing teeth. By replacing the missing teeth, it can prevent neighbouring teeth tilting or drifting and also prevents the overeruption of opposing teeth which could then impact on occlusion and temporo-mandibular joint dysfunction and impact the patient's susceptibility to gum disease, tooth wear and tooth fractures. However, studies have suggested that a stable occlusion can be achieved even with a shortened arch of 10 occluding pairs of teeth. The findings support the concept that a healthy and stable occlusion can exist despite missing teeth as long as an acceptable number of teeth are in occlusion. However, this management technique may not be suitable for those with gum disease, parafunctioning activity (tooth grinding or clenching) or malocclusion.

It should also be noted that spaces within the dental arch should be monitored, especially in younger patients, as teeth are more likely to drift, tilt or over-erupt. To do this, study models and clinical photographs could be taken in order to record baseline records. If tooth movement was to occur, another form of management may be required depending on the severity and nature.

The following below are the methods used to manage hypodontia:

=== Accept spacing ===
This is a method suitable to individuals if the space from a missing tooth is not deemed to be an aesthetic concern. Appearance may not be a problem in some cases, for example, when spacing present behind the canines may not be particularly visible, depending on the individual.

=== Management of retained primary teeth ===
When there is a case of hypodontia of the permanent premolar teeth, the primary molar teeth would often remain in the mouth beyond the time they are meant to be lost. Therefore, with a presence of healthy primary teeth in the absence of a permanent successor, retaining the primary teeth can be a feasible management of hypodontia.

The primary molars present also functions as a space maintainer, prevent alveolar bone resorption and delays future prosthodontic space replacement by acting as a semi permanent solution going into adulthood Previous studies also shown a good prognosis of retained primary molars going into adulthood. However, leaving the primary teeth in place may run the risk of tooth infraocclusion where the occlusal surface is below that of adjacent teeth.

Despite this, the retention of primary teeth, particularly molars, are more susceptible to occlusal wear, over-eruption of opposing teeth and the loss of inter-occlusal space.

=== Orthodontic space closure ===
Orthodontic space closure is a way of using orthodontics in order to close spaces in the mouth where the teeth are missing. The ideal age for definitive orthodontic treatment is early adolescence but it is important to consider the patient's age, severity of hypodontia, patient expectations and their commitment to treatment. It can be an option for hypodontia management in the case of missing maxillary lateral incisors through the reshaping, and mesial re-positioning of the adjacent canine. This management is indicated in hypodontia cases of Class I molar relationship with severe crowding in the mandibular anterior region where the extraction of lower premolar leads to a predictable outcome, and Class II molar relationship in the absence of crowding and protrusion of the mandibular anterior dentition.

When moving the canine into the space of the lateral incisor, the dimensions of the canine, root position and gingival position differ from a lateral incisor and therefore preparation of the canine is necessary in order for it to mimic the incisor. This may involve:

- Reduction of the incisal tip and addition of composite on the incisal edge to create a straight contour and a rounded disto-incisal corner
- Reduction of the mesial and distal surfaces to reduce the width of the tooth
- Flattening of the labial surface to reduce bulbosity. However, removal of enamel by expose the darker coloured dentine and therefore further restoration may be required.
- Preparation of the palatal surface of the canine to reduce its bulk.

The use of veneers can also be used instead of composite however, these are more expensive and more time-consuming.

There have been several studies which showed the advantages of orthodontic space closure without prosthodontic space replacements. The main advantage mentioned is the early completion of the treatment during early adolescence and the long lasting result of the treatment outcome. In individuals with a high smile line, the mesial re-positioning of canine maintains the normal soft tissue architecture is important in maintaining the aesthetic appearance. This option also negates the risks and costs that comes with prosthodontic treatment and the impression that there is no missing tooth.

Some factors need to be considered when making a decision whether to undergo space closure. These include facial profile, size and dimension of canine, the shade of colour of the teeth and the gingival contour and height. Group function occlusion is usually present as a result of the mesial movement of the canine. In order to maintain the stability of the closed space, direct-bonded lingual retainers are usually required.

=== Orthodontic space opening prior to prosthodontic treatment ===
The need for orthodontic space opening prior to prosthodontic management depends on the amount of edentulous space available in relation to adjacent teeth, occlusion and aesthetic concerns. To determine the amount of space needed, three methods in the literature can be used which are the golden proportion, the Bolton Analysis and comparing the edentulous space with the contralateral tooth size if present.

Space opening and prosthodontic treatment is indicated where there is a Class I molar relationships in the absence of malocclusion Class III molar relationships presenting with a concave facial profile. However, the alteration in appearance during orthodontic treatment (e.g. creating diastema for placement of prostheses) before the filling up the space, although temporary, can negatively impact the oral health-related quality of life in adolescents.

=== Removable partial dentures ===
Removable partial dentures are known to be an effective interim method for maintaining functional and aesthetic demands in a growing patient, where definitive fixed restorations are not suitable yet. Removable dentures act as a space maintainer and also prevent the migration of adjacent or opposing teeth, thereby preserving the face height. They are also easy to adjust or add on to in the event of further tooth eruption. However, it may be difficult for young individuals to adhere with wearing removable dentures, due to their bulk. Some patients also find the idea of dentures functionally and socially unacceptable, making them unwilling to comply. Removable prosthetic devices are also known to cause damage to the remaining teeth if worn over a long period of time.

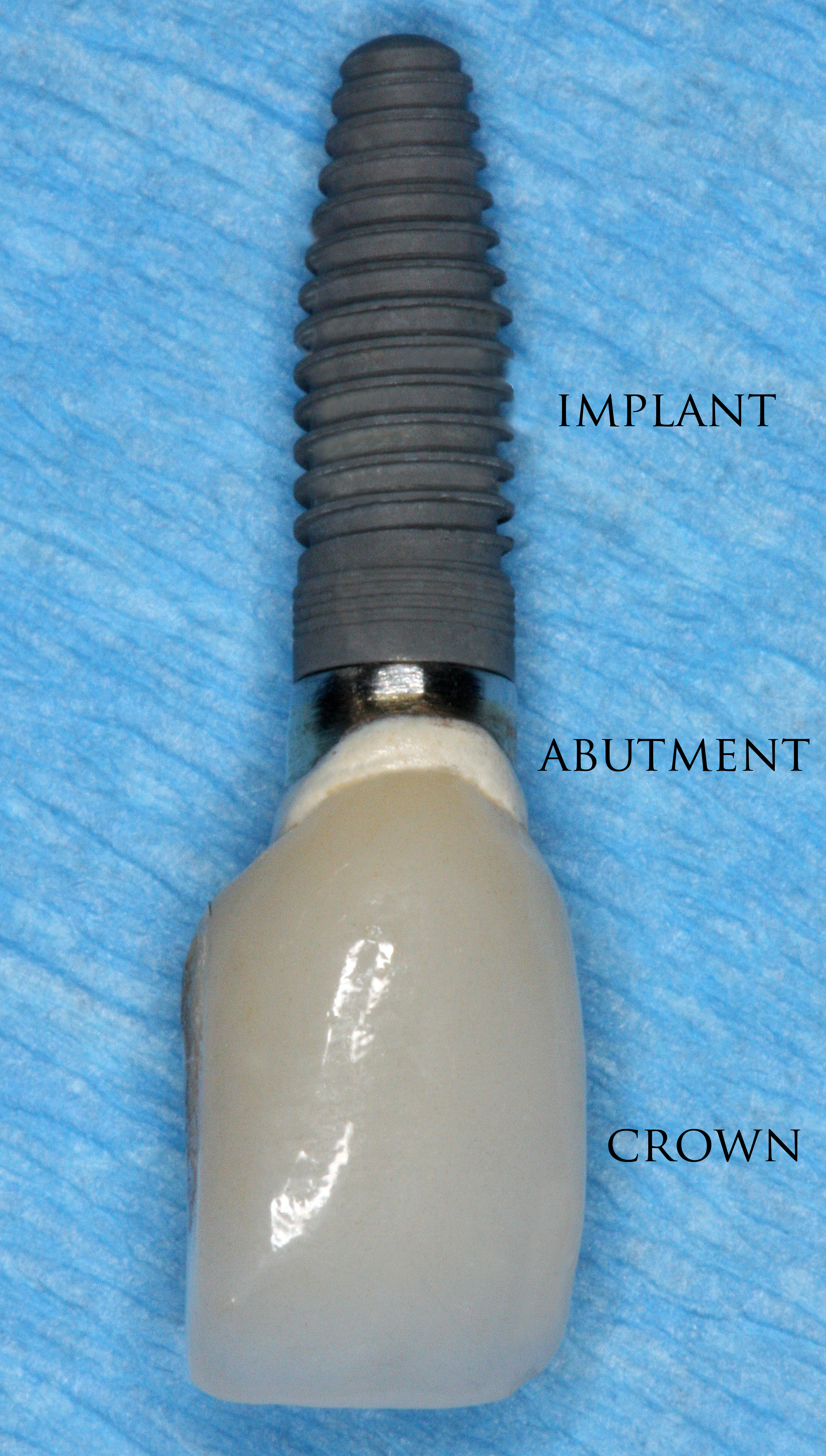
Dental implant

=== Conventional crown and bridgework ===
Fixed restorative options are generally preferred over removable ones.

- Resin-bonded bridges: Due to its minimal preparation required, this method of replacing teeth is more suited to young adults. It is a definitive restoration with the ability to fill up one or two tooth spaces. Research has reflected a survival rate of 80% over a period of 6 years or longer, and that cantilever resin-bonded bridges are at least as good as conventional fixed-fixed bridges. Restoring teeth with this method can only be done after orthodontic treatment and will need an element of retention to ensure that tooth contacts are not misplaced.
- Conventional bridges: Teeth tend to be prepared for conventional bridgework if there are large restorations present, thus being more commonly done on adult patients with hypodontia. Treatment with conventional bridgework will require significant reduction of tooth structure, which will put the tooth at risk of biological damage i.e. loss of vitality. This risk is especially high in young patients with large pulp chambers.

=== Tooth autotransplantation ===
Autotransplantation involves the removal of a tooth from one socket and relocating to another socket in the same individual. If done successfully, it is able to ensure stable alveolar bone volume as there is continuous stimulation of the periodontal ligament.

=== Implant supported tooth replacement ===
Placing dental implants has proven to be a predictable and reliable method of treating hypodontia, along with bringing excellent aesthetic results. Implant placement should be delayed until jaw growth in an individual is complete. One limitation of implant placement would be the need for a sufficient amount of bone volume, which if not met, may affect the positioning of the implant. However, bone grafting can be carried out to overcome this.

== Epidemiology ==
Hypodontia is less common in the primary dentition, with reported prevalence rates ranging from 0.5% in the Icelandic population to 2.4% in the Japanese population. In the primary dentition the teeth reported as most likely to be missing are the lateral incisors, both maxillary and mandibular. If a deciduous tooth is missing this will increase the risk of an absent successor.

In the permanent dentition third molars are most commonly absent, and one study found prevalence rates of between 20–22%. When third molars are ignored the prevalence rate for each tooth varies from study to study. In Caucasian studies mandibular second premolars and maxillary lateral incisors are most often absent. Several UK studies have found the lower second premolar to be most commonly absent. Studies from Asian populations report that the mandibular incisor is most commonly absent.

A higher prevalence of hypodontia in females has been reported. The most extensive studies have been in Caucasian populations and suggest a prevalence of 4–6%.

One study looked at 33 previous studies with a sample size of 127,000, and concluded that the prevalence of hypodontia in the permanent dentition varied between continents, racial groups and genders. In the white European population they suggested a prevalence of 4.6% in males and 6.3% in females. In an African-American sample they found this to be 3.2% in males and 4.6% in females. The same study found that in the permanent dentition the most likely teeth to be missing and the frequency of these missing teeth was:

- Mandibular second premolar 3%
- Maxillary lateral incisor 1.7%
- Maxillary second premolar 1.5%
- Mandibular central incisor 0.3%
