= PAX9 =

Protein-coding gene in humans

Identifiers
- Aliases: PAX9, STHAG3, paired box 9
- External IDs: OMIM: 167416; MGI: 97493; GeneCards: PAX9

Gene location (Human)
Chr.	Chromosome 14 (human)
Band	14q13.3	Start	36,657,568 bp
Band	14q13.3	End	36,679,362 bp

Gene location (Mouse)
Chr.	Chromosome 12 (mouse)
Band	12 C1|12 24.53 cM	Start	56,738,552 bp
Band	12 C1|12 24.53 cM	End	56,759,607 bp
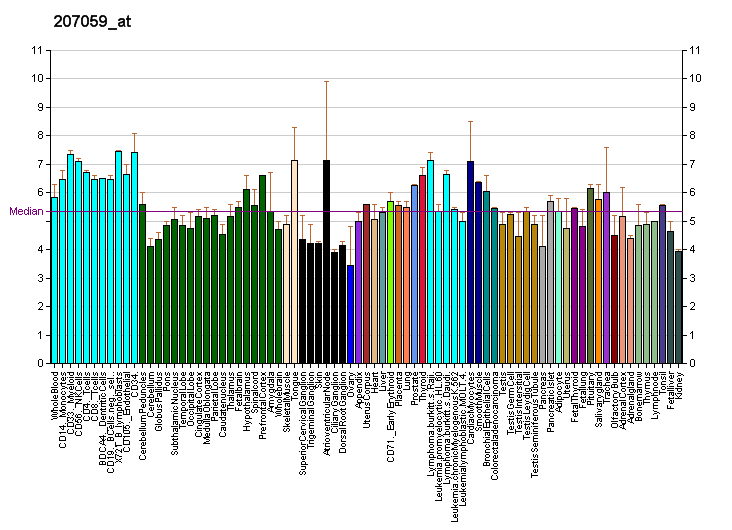
RNA expression pattern
Bgee	Human / Mouse (ortholog); Top expressed in: parotid gland; oral cavity; testicle; mucosa of pharynx; amniotic fluid; oocyte; olfactory zone of nasal mucosa; secondary oocyte; minor salivary glands; tonsil / Top expressed in: parotid gland; sclerotome; external carotid artery; esophagus; lacrimal gland; internal carotid artery; footplate; pharyngeal pouch; submandibular gland; condyle; More reference expression data
BioGPS	More reference expression data
Gene ontology
Molecular function	DNA-binding transcription activator activity, RNA polymerase II-specific; DNA binding; RNA polymerase II transcription regulatory region sequence-specific DNA binding; protein binding; DNA-binding transcription factor activity; DNA-binding transcription factor activity, RNA polymerase II-specific
Cellular component	nucleus
Biological process	regulation of odontogenesis; multicellular organism development; cellular response to growth factor stimulus; endoderm development; negative regulation of transcription, DNA-templated; regulation of transcription, DNA-templated; transcription by RNA polymerase II; face morphogenesis; transcription, DNA-templated; positive regulation of transcription by RNA polymerase II; odontogenesis; animal organ morphogenesis
Sources:Amigo / QuickGO
Orthologs
Databases	NCBI: entry; OMA: entry
Species	Human	Mouse
Entrez	5083	18511
Ensembl	ENSG00000198807	ENSMUSG00000001497
UniProt	P55771	P47242
RefSeq (mRNA)	NM_006194; NM_001372076	NM_011041
RefSeq (protein)	NP_006185; NP_001359005	NP_035171
Location (UCSC)	Chr 14: 36.66 – 36.68 Mb	Chr 12: 56.74 – 56.76 Mb
PubMed search
- Wikidata
View/Edit Human	View/Edit Mouse

Paired box gene 9, also known as PAX9, is a protein which in humans is encoded by the PAX9 gene. It is also found in other mammals.

== Expression and function ==
This gene is a member of the paired box (PAX) family of transcription factors. During mouse embryogenesis Pax9 expression starts from embryonic day 8.5 and becomes more evident by E9.5; at this stage its expression is restricted to the pharyngeal endoderm. Later on, Pax9 is also expressed in the axial skeleton. Pax9 is required for craniofacial, tooth and limb development, and may more generally involve development of stratified squamous epithelia as well as various organs and skeletal elements. PAX9 plays a role in the absence of wisdom teeth in some human populations (possibly along with the less well studied AXIN2 and MSX1).

== Clinical significance ==
This gene was found amplified in lung cancer. The amplification covers three tissue developmental genes - TTF1, NKX2-8, and PAX9. It appears that certain lung cancer cells select for DNA copy number amplification and increased RNA/protein expression of these three coamplified genes for functional advantages.

=== Oligodontia ===
Oligodontia is a genetic disorder caused by the mutation of the PAX9 gene. This disorder results in the congenital absence of 6 or more permanent teeth not including wisdom teeth. Also known as selective tooth agenesis (STHAG), it is the most common disorder in regard to human dentition, affecting a little less than one fourth of the population. The gene PAX9 which can be found on chromosome 14 encodes a group of transcription factors that play an important role in early tooth development. In humans, a frameshift mutation in the paired domain of PAX9 was discovered in those affected with oligodontia. Multiple mechanisms are possible by which the mutation may arise. Recently, a study involving the missense mutation of a PAX9 gene suggests that the loss of function due to the absence DNA binding domain is a mechanism that causes oligodontia. Those who express the PAX9 mutation and develop the disorder continue to have a normal life expectancy. Along with the mutation of the PAX9 gene, MSX1 gene mutations have also shown to affect dental development in fetuses.

== Interactions ==
PAX9 has been shown to interact with JARID1B.
