= Andreas Rett =

Austrian neurologist and author (1924–1997)

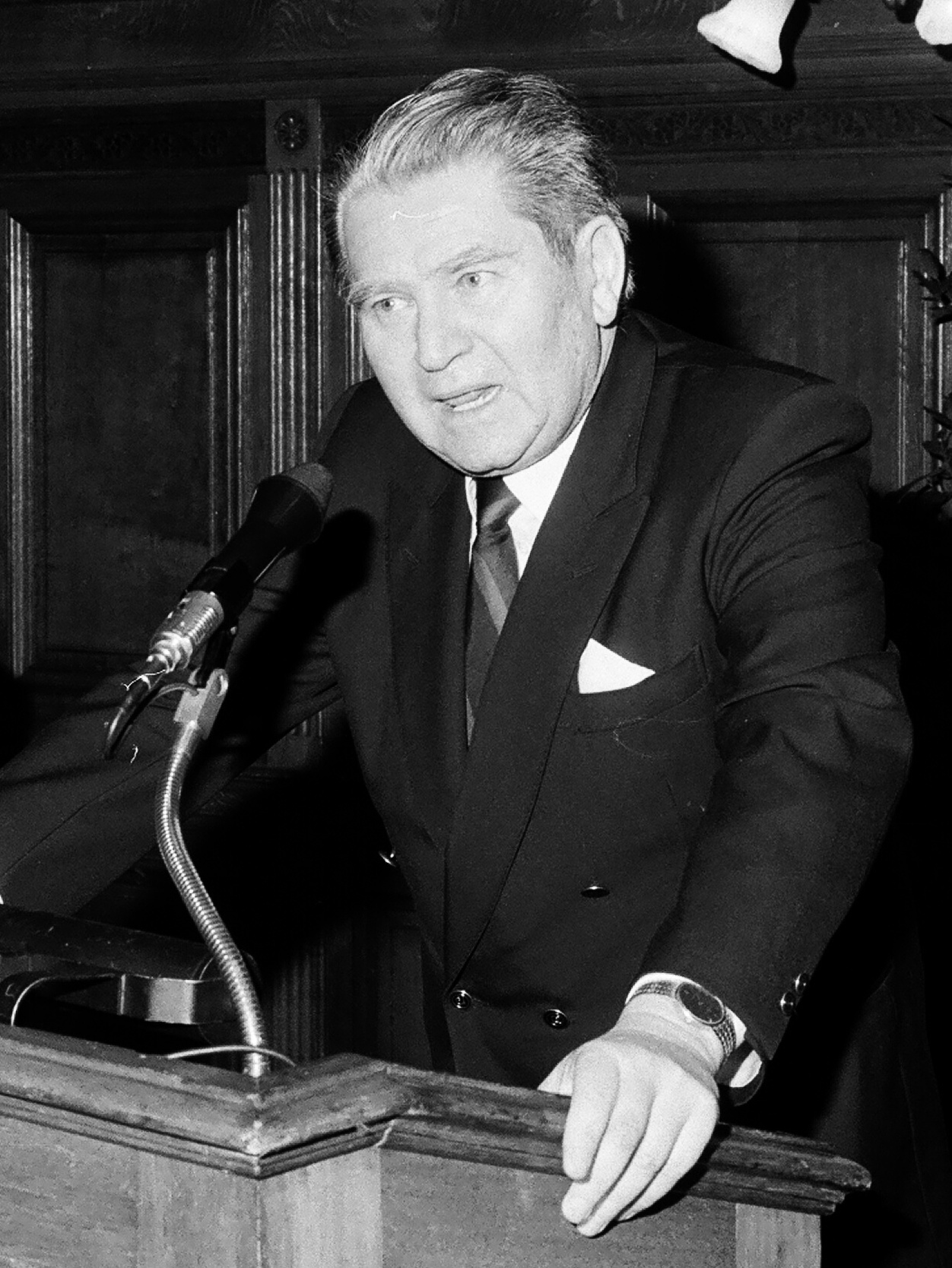
- Rett in 1987
- Born: 2 January 1924; Fürth, Germany
- Died: 25 April 1997 (aged 73)
- Education: University of Vienna
- Known for: Rett syndrome
- Medical career
- Research: Neurodevelopmental disorders

Andreas Rett (2 January 1924 – 25 April 1997) was an Austrian neurologist and author. He is famous for his research on neurodevelopmental disorders, particularly for his description of Rett syndrome, which was named after him, and for pioneering treatment based on the belief that disabled children also have a right to fulfillment of their physical, emotional, and psychological needs. He received many awards, including the Grand Decoration of Honour for Services to the Republic of Austria.

== Biography ==
Rett was born in Fürth, Germany and went to school in Innsbruck, Austria. His father owned a cleaning services company and wanted his son to follow in his footsteps, but Andreas Rett instead chose to study medicine, resulting in his father disinheriting him. He graduated as a physician in 1949. He then trained in paediatrics, and in 1955 he was appointed head of the facility for children with Down syndrome at a home for the aged in Lainz, Vienna. In 1963 he built up a factory, in which neurologically sick youngsters could work. His belief was that disabled children also do have a right to fulfillment of their physical, emotional, and psychological needs.

Rett's academic career began in 1967, when he was appointed as lecturer in neurology and pediatrics at the University of Vienna, in 1973 being promoted to the rank of associate professor.

In 1966 he published the first description of Rett syndrome in 22 girls, after first observing hand-wringing gestures in two girls in his waiting room.

From 1967 he was also head of the Ludwig Boltzmann Institute for Research in Brain Disordered Children. He has published more than 250 articles.

== Membership in Nazi Party ==
After Rett's death, he received criticism for having been listed as a member of the Hitler Jugend and the Nazi Party as a child and young adult. Andreas Rett was nine years old when the Nazis came to power in Germany and 21 years old at the time of the regime's demise. In recent years he has also been criticized for using research data derived from the Nazi program of Action T4, which was the name given to the mass murder of hundreds of thousands of people, including of children, under the guise of medical euthanasia. Although there is no evidence Rett was directly involved in Action T4, his membership in the Nazi Party is notable given that other wartime figures whose history has come under re-examination, such as Austrian physician Hans Asperger, never joined the party.

== Decorations and awards ==
- 1958: Karl Renner Prize
- 1976: Austrian Cross of Honour for Science and Art, 1st class
- 1982: Paracelsus Ring of Villach
- 1988: City of Vienna Prize for Medical Sciences
- 1989: Grand Decoration of Honour for Services to the Republic of Austria
- 2002: Andreas Rett Park in Hietzing (Vienna)
