= Trofinetide =

Pharmaceutical drug

Clinical data
- Trade names: Daybue, Daybue Stix, Daybu
- Other names: NNZ-2566
- AHFS/Drugs.com: Monograph
- MedlinePlus: a623019
- License data: US DailyMed: Trofinetide
- Routes of administration: By mouth, feeding tube (gastrostomy tube)
- ATC code: N07XX24 (WHO)

Legal status
- Legal status: CA: ℞-only; US: ℞-only; EU: Rx-only

Pharmacokinetic data
- Bioavailability: 84%
- Metabolism: Insignificant
- Elimination half-life: ~ 1.5 h
- Excretion: Urine

Identifiers
- IUPAC name: (2S)-2-{[(2S)-1-(2-aminoacetyl)-2-methylpyrrolidine-2-carbonyl]amino}pentanedioic acid
- CAS Number: 853400-76-7
- PubChem CID: 11318905
- DrugBank: DB06045
- ChemSpider: 9493869
- UNII: Z2ME8F52QL
- KEGG: D12400
- ChEBI: CHEBI:229599
- ChEMBL: ChEMBL197084

Chemical and physical data
- Formula: C_{13}H_{21}N_{3}O_{6}
- Molar mass: 315.326 g·mol^{−1}
- 3D model (JSmol): Interactive image
- SMILES: C[C@]1(CCCN1C(=O)CN)C(=O)N[C@@H](CCC(=O)O)C(=O)O
- InChI: InChI=1S/C13H21N3O6/c1-13(5-2-6-16(13)9(17)7-14)12(22)15-8(11(20)21)3-4-10(18)19/h8H,2-7,14H2,1H3,(H,15,22)(H,18,19)(H,20,21)/t8-,13-/m0/s1; Key:BUSXWGRAOZQTEY-SDBXPKJASA-N

Trofinetide, sold under the brand name Daybue among others, is a medication used to treat Rett syndrome. It is taken by mouth.

The most common side effects include diarrhea and vomiting.

Trofinetide was approved for medical use in the United States in 2023.

== Medical uses ==
Trofinetide is used for Rett syndrome in people two years of age and older.

== History ==
Trofinetide was developed by Neuren Pharmaceuticals that acts as an analogue of the neuropeptide (1-3) IGF-1, which is a simple tripeptide with sequence Gly-Pro-Glu obtained by enzymatic cleavage of the growth factor IGF-1 within the brain. Trofinetide has anti-inflammatory properties and was originally developed as a potential treatment for stroke, but has subsequently been developed for other applications and is approved by the FDA as an oral solution. It has successfully completed phase III clinical trial against Rett syndrome. Trofinetide has also had a successful phase II trial against Fragile X syndrome. It is manufactured by Acadia Pharmaceuticals.

The US Food and Drug Administration (FDA) evaluated the efficacy and safety of trofinetide based on a randomized, double-blind, placebo-controlled, 12-week study (Study 1; NCT04181723) of participants with Rett syndrome 5 to 20 years of age. Participants were randomized to receive trofinetide (N=93) or matching placebo (N=94) for 12 weeks. The dose of trofinetide was based on participant weight to achieve similar exposure in all participants. The FDA granted the application for trofinetide priority review, orphan drug, and fast track designations.

The US Food and Drug Administration considers it to be a first-in-class medication.

== Society and culture ==
=== Legal status ===
Trofinetide (Daybue) was approved for medical use in the United States in March 2023 and again in powder form (Daybue Stix) in December 2025.

Daybu was authoried for medical use in the European Union in August 2026.

=== Names ===
Trofinetide is sold under the brand names Daybue, Daybue Stix, and Daybu.
