= SATB2 =

Protein-coding gene in the species Homo sapiens

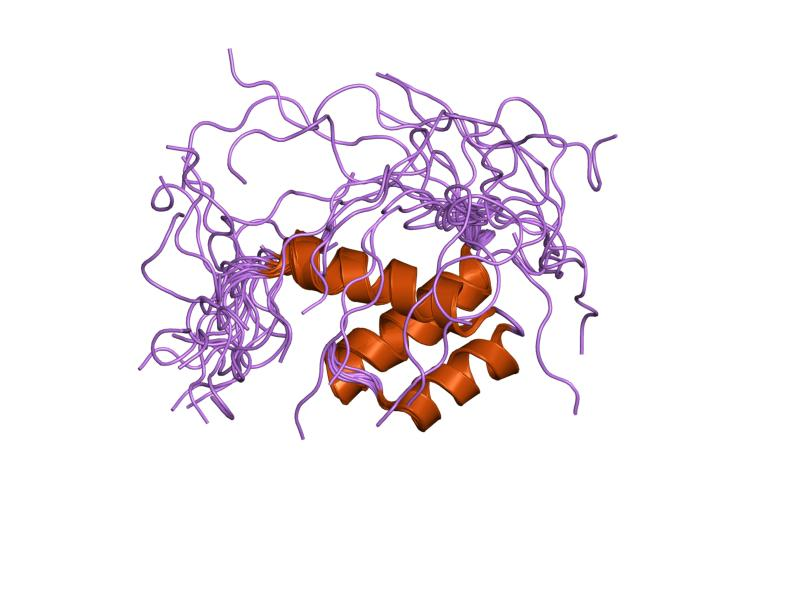

Identifiers
- Aliases: SATB2, GLSS, SATB homeobox 2
- External IDs: OMIM: 608148; MGI: 2679336; GeneCards: SATB2
Available structures
PDB	Ortholog search: PDBe RCSB
PDB	List of PDB id codes 1WI3, 1WIZ, 2CSF

Gene location (Human)
Chr.	Chromosome 2 (human)
Band	2q33.1	Start	199,269,500 bp
Band	2q33.1	End	199,471,266 bp

Gene location (Mouse)
Chr.	Chromosome 1 (mouse)
Band	1|1 C1.3	Start	56,833,140 bp
Band	1|1 C1.3	End	57,017,809 bp
RNA expression pattern
Bgee	Human / Mouse (ortholog); Top expressed in: periodontal fiber; mucosa of sigmoid colon; tibia; rectum; mucosa of ileum; mucosa of transverse colon; middle temporal gyrus; Brodmann area 46; superior frontal gyrus; postcentral gyrus / Top expressed in: facial skeleton; Dermatocranium; membranous bone; mandible; maxilla; rib; body of femur; barrel cortex; left colon; molar; More reference expression data
BioGPS	n/a
Gene ontology
Molecular function	sequence-specific DNA binding; DNA binding; chromatin binding; protein binding; RNA polymerase II cis-regulatory region sequence-specific DNA binding; DNA-binding transcription activator activity, RNA polymerase II-specific; RNA polymerase II transcription regulatory region sequence-specific DNA binding; DNA-binding transcription factor activity, RNA polymerase II-specific
Cellular component	histone deacetylase complex; transcription regulator complex; nuclear matrix; nucleus; nucleoplasm
Biological process	commitment of neuronal cell to specific neuron type in forebrain; embryonic skeletal system morphogenesis; cellular response to organic substance; chromatin remodeling; roof of mouth development; regulation of transcription, DNA-templated; embryonic pattern specification; regulation of transcription by RNA polymerase II; neuron migration; negative regulation of transcription by RNA polymerase II; transcription, DNA-templated; multicellular organism development; cartilage development; regulation of gene expression; osteoblast development; positive regulation of transcription by RNA polymerase II; transcription by RNA polymerase II; chromatin organization
Sources:Amigo / QuickGO
Orthologs
Databases	NCBI: entry; OMA: entry
Species	Human	Mouse
Entrez	23314	212712
Ensembl	ENSG00000119042	ENSMUSG00000038331
UniProt	Q9UPW6	Q8VI24
RefSeq (mRNA)	NM_001172509; NM_001172517; NM_015265	NM_139146; NM_001358580; NM_001358581
RefSeq (protein)	NP_001165980; NP_001165988; NP_056080	NP_631885; NP_001345509; NP_001345510
Location (UCSC)	Chr 2: 199.27 – 199.47 Mb	Chr 1: 56.83 – 57.02 Mb
PubMed search
- Wikidata
View/Edit Human	View/Edit Mouse

Special AT-rich sequence-binding protein 2 (SATB2) also known as DNA-binding protein SATB2 is a protein that in humans is encoded by the SATB2 gene. SATB2 is a DNA-binding protein that specifically binds nuclear matrix attachment regions and is involved in transcriptional regulation and chromatin remodeling. SATB2 shows a restricted mode of expression and is expressed in certain cell nuclei . The SATB2 protein is mainly expressed in the epithelial cells of the colon and rectum, followed by the nuclei of neurons in the brain.

== Function ==
With an average worldwide prevalence of 1/800 live births, oral clefts are one of the most common birth defects. Although over 300 malformation syndromes can include an oral cleft, non-syndromic forms represent about 70% of cases with cleft lip with or without cleft palate (CL/P) and roughly 50% of cases with cleft palate (CP) only. Non-syndromic oral clefts are considered 'complex' or 'multifactorial' in that both genes and environmental factors contribute to the etiology. Current research suggests that several genes are likely to control risk, as well as environmental factors such as maternal smoking.

Re-sequencing studies to identify specific mutations suggest several different genes may control risk to oral clefts, and many distinct variants or mutations in apparently causal genes have been found reflecting a high degree of allelic heterogeneity. Although most of these mutations are extremely rare and often show incomplete penetrance (i.e., an unaffected parent or other relatives may also carry the mutation), combined they may account for up to 5% of non-syndromic oral cleft.

Mutations in the SATB2 gene have been found to cause isolated cleft palates. SATB2 also likely influences brain development. This is consistent with mouse studies that show SATB2 is necessary for the proper establishment of cortical neuron connections across the corpus callosum, despite the apparently normal corpus callosum in heterozygous knockout mice.

== Structure ==
SATB2 is a 733 amino-acid homeodomain-containing human protein with a molecular weight of 82.5 kDa encoded by the SATB2 gene on 2q33. The protein contains two degenerate homeodomain regions known as CUT domains (amino acid 352–437 and 482–560) and a classical homeodomain (amino acid 614–677). There is an extraordinarily high degree of sequence conservation, with only three predicted amino-acid substitutions in the 733 residue protein with I481V, A590T and I730T being amino acid differences between the human and the mouse protein.

== Clinical significance ==
SATB2 has been implicated as causative in the cleft or high palate of individuals with 2q32q33 microdeletion or Glass syndrome.

SATB2 was found to be disrupted in two unrelated cases with de novo apparently balanced chromosome translocations associated with cleft palate and Pierre Robin sequence.

The role of SATB2 in tooth and jaw development is supported by the identification of a de novo SATB2 mutation in a male with profound intellectual disabilities and jaw and tooth abnormalities and a translocation interrupting SATB2 in an individual with Robin sequence. In addition, mouse models have demonstrated haploinsufficiency of SATB2 results in craniofacial defects that phenocopy those caused by 2q32q33 deletion in humans; moreover, full functional loss of SATB2 amplifies these defects.

SATB2 expression is highly specific for cancer in the lower GI-tract and has been implicated as a cancer biomarker for colorectal cancer.
