= Rett syndrome =

Genetic brain disorder

- Other names: Cerebroatrophic Hyperammonemia (obsolete), dementia, ataxia, and loss of purposeful hand use syndrome
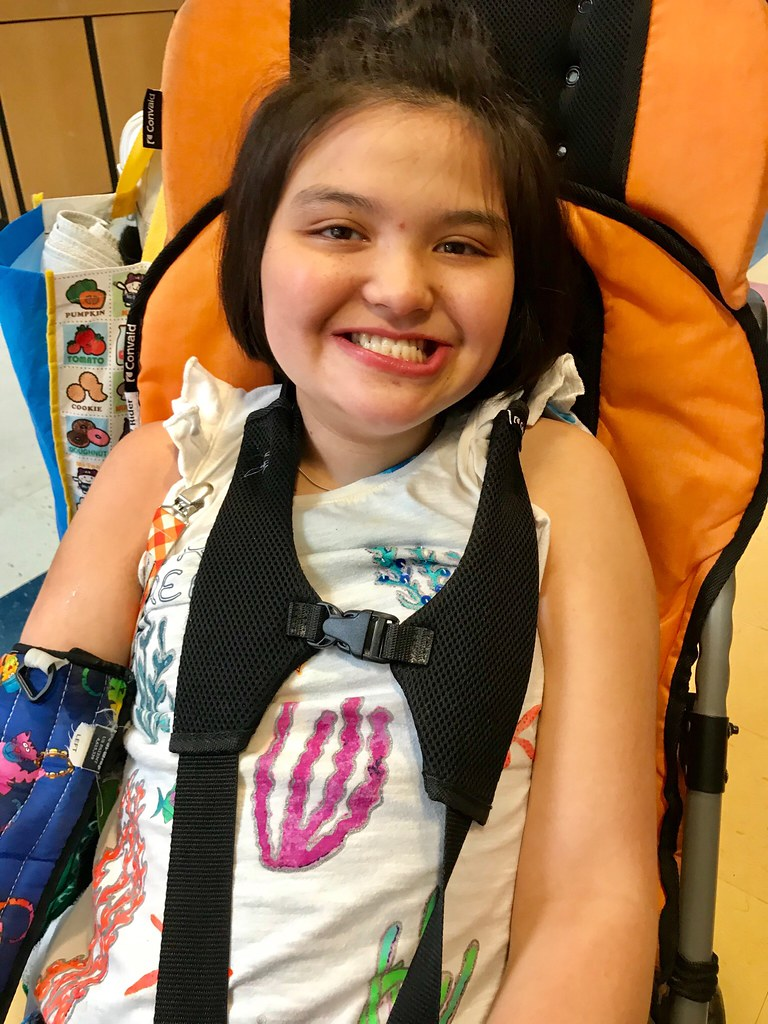
- A girl with Rett syndrome displaying characteristic motor impairment
- Specialty: Psychiatry, clinical psychology, pediatrics, neurology
- Symptoms: Impairments in language and coordination, and repetitive movements, slower growth, smaller head
- Complications: Seizures, scoliosis, sleeping problems
- Usual onset: After 6–18 months of age
- Duration: Lifelong
- Causes: Mutation in the MECP2 gene
- Diagnostic method: Based on symptoms, genetic testing
- Differential diagnosis: Angelman syndrome, autism, cerebral palsy, childhood disintegrative disorder, various neurodegenerative disorders
- Treatment: Special education, physiotherapy, braces
- Medication: Anticonvulsants
- Prognosis: Life expectancy for many is middle age
- Frequency: 1 in 8,500 females; Lethal in males, with rare exceptions

Rett syndrome (RTT) is a genetic disorder that typically becomes apparent after 6–18 months of age in girls. Symptoms include impairments in language and coordination, and repetitive movements. Those affected often have slower growth, difficulty walking, and a smaller head size. Complications can include seizures, scoliosis, and sleeping problems. The severity of the condition; however, is variable.

Rett syndrome is due to a genetic mutation, with around 90% of cases in the MECP2 gene, on the X chromosome (specifically Xq28). It almost always occurs as a new mutation, with less than one percent of cases being inherited. It occurs almost exclusively in girls; boys who have a similar mutation typically die shortly after birth. Diagnosis is based on the symptoms and can be confirmed with genetic testing.

There is no known consistent cure for Rett syndrome. Treatment is directed at improving symptoms. The strongest FDA approved contender is trofinetide (Daybue). Anticonvulsants may be used to help with seizures. Special education, physiotherapy, and leg braces may also be useful depending on the needs of the child. Many of those with the condition live into middle age.

The condition affects about 1 in 8,500 females. In 1999, Lebanese-American physician Huda Zoghbi discovered the mutation that causes the condition.

== Signs and symptoms ==
=== Stage I ===
Stage I, called early-onset, typically begins between 6 and 18 months of age. Diagnosis is by clinical observation, and stage I is often overlooked because symptoms of the disorder may be somewhat vague; parents and doctors may not notice the subtle slowing of development at first. The infant may begin to show less eye contact and have reduced interest in toys. There may be delays in gross motor skills such as sitting or crawling. Hand-wringing and decreasing head growth may occur, but not enough to draw attention. This stage usually lasts for a few months but can continue for more than a year.

=== Stage II ===
Stage II, or the rapid destructive stage, usually begins between ages 1 and 4 and may last for weeks or months. Its onset may be rapid or gradual as the child loses purposeful hand skills and spoken language. Characteristic hand movements such as wringing, washing, clapping, or tapping, as well as repeatedly moving the hands to the mouth often begin during this stage which is called mouthing. The child may hold the hands clasped behind the back or held at the sides, with random touching, grasping, and releasing. The movements continue while the child is awake but disappear during sleep. Breathing irregularities such as episodes of apnea and hyperventilation may occur, although breathing usually improves during sleep. Some individuals also display autistic-like symptoms such as loss of social interaction and communication. Walking may be unsteady and initiating motor movements can be difficult. Slowed head growth is usually noticed during this stage.

=== Stage III ===
Stage III, or the plateau or pseudo-stationary stage, usually begins between ages 2 and 10 and can last for years. Apraxia, motor problems, and seizures are prominent during this stage. However, there may be improvement in behavior, with less irritability, crying, and autism-resembling features. In this stage the child may be more interested in their surroundings and display increased alertness, attention span, and communication skills may improve. Many individuals with the condition remain in this stage for most of their lives.

=== Stage IV ===
Stage IV, or the late motor deterioration stage, can last for years or decades. Prominent features include reduced mobility, curvature of the spine, and muscle weakness, rigidity, spasticity, and increased muscle tone with abnormal posturing of an arm or leg. Individuals who were previously able to walk may lose this ability. Cognition, communication, or hand skills generally do not decline in stage IV. Repetitive hand movements may decrease and eye gaze usually improves.

=== Variants ===
The signs and symptoms of the typical form of the Rett syndrome are well described. In addition to the classical form of Rett syndrome, several atypical forms have been described over the years; the main groups are:

- Congenital variant (Rolando variant, FOXG1 syndrome): in this severe subtype of Rett syndrome, the development of the patients and their head circumference are abnormal from birth. The typical gaze of Rett syndrome patients is usually absent. Due to the differences and symptoms and cause, it is often not considered a variant of Rett syndrome;
- Zappella variant of Rett Syndrome or preserved speech variant: in this subtype of Rett syndrome the patients acquire some manual skills and language is partially recovered around the age of 5 years (that is after the regression phase). Height, weight and head circumference are often in the normal range, and a good gross motor function can be observed. The Zappella variant is a milder form of Rett syndrome;
- Hanefeld variant or early epilepsy variant. In this form of Rett syndrome, the patients have epilepsy before 5 months of age.

The definition itself of the Rett syndrome has been refined over the years: as the atypical forms subsist near to the classical form (Hagberg & Gillberg, 1993), the "Rett Complex" terminology has been introduced.

== Cause ==
Genetically, Rett syndrome (RTT) is often caused by mutations in the gene MECP2 located on the X chromosome (which is involved in transcriptional silencing and epigenetic regulation of methylated DNA), and can arise sporadically or from germline mutations. In less than 10% of RTT cases, mutations in the genes CDKL5 or FOXG1 have also been found to resemble it.

A 2021 study by scholars based at Scottish universities states that Rett syndrome is in fact a neurodevelopmental condition as opposed to a neurodegenerative condition. One piece of evidence for this is that mice with induced Rett syndrome show no neuronal death, and some studies have suggested that their phenotypes can be partially rescued by adding functional MECP2 gene back when they are adults. This information has also helped lead to further studies aiming to treat the disorder.

=== Sporadic mutations ===
In at least 95% of Rett syndrome cases, the cause is a de novo mutation in the child, almost exclusively from a de novo mutation on the male copy of the X chromosome. It is not yet known what causes the sperm to mutate, and such mutations are rare.

=== Germline mutations ===
It can also be inherited from phenotypically normal mothers who have a germline mutation in the gene encoding methyl-CpG-binding protein-2, MeCP2. In these cases, inheritance follows an X-linked dominant pattern and is seen almost exclusively in females, as most males die in utero or shortly after birth. MECP2 is found near the end of the long arm of the X chromosome at Xq28. An atypical form of RTT, characterized by infantile spasms or early onset epilepsy, can also be caused by a mutation to the gene encoding cyclin-dependent kinase-like 5 (CDKL5). As stated by Aine Merwick, Margaret O'Brien, and Norman Delanty in an article on gene disorders titled Complex single gene disorders and epilepsy, "Rett syndrome affects one in every 12,500 female live births by age 12 years."

== Mechanism ==
The location of the gene responsible for Rett syndrome

=== Pontine noradrenergic deficits ===
Brain levels of norepinephrine are lower in people with Rett syndrome (reviewed in). The genetic loss of MECP2 changes the properties of cells in the locus coeruleus, the exclusive source of noradrenergic innervation to the cerebral cortex and hippocampus. These changes include hyperexcitability and decreased functioning of its noradrenergic innervation. Moreover, a reduction of the tyrosine hydroxylase (Th) mRNA level, the rate-limiting enzyme in catecholamine synthesis, was detected in the whole pons of MECP2-null male as well as in adult heterozygous (MECP2+/-) female mice. Using immunoquantitative techniques, a decrease of Th protein staining level, number of locus coeruleus Th-expressing neurons and density of dendritic arborization surrounding the structure was shown in symptomatic MeCP2-deficient mice. However, locus coeruleus cells are not dying, but are more likely losing their fully mature phenotype, since no apoptotic neurons in the pons were detected.

Researchers have concluded that "Because these neurons are a pivotal source of norepinephrine throughout the brainstem and forebrain and are involved in the regulation of diverse functions disrupted in Rett syndrome, such as respiration and cognition, we hypothesize that the locus coeruleus is a critical site at which loss of MECP2 results in CNS dysfunction." The restoration of normal locus coeruleus function may therefore be of potential therapeutic value in the treatment of Rett syndrome.

=== Midbrain dopaminergic disturbances ===
The majority of dopamine in the mammalian brain is synthesized by nuclei located in the mesencephalon. The substantia nigra pars compacta (SNpc), the ventral tegmental area (VTA) and the retrorubral field (RRF) contain dopaminergic neurons expressing tyrosine hydroxylase (Th, i.e. the rate-limiting enzyme in catecholamine synthesis).

The nigro-striatal pathway originates from the SNpc; its principal rostral target is the caudate-putamen (CPu), which it irradiates through the median forebrain bundle (MFB). This connection is involved in the tight modulation of motor strategies computed by a cortico-basal ganglia-thalamo-cortical loop.

Indeed, based on the canonical anatomofunctional model of basal ganglia, nigrostriatal dopamine is able to modulate the motor loop by acting on dopaminergic receptors located on striatal GABAergic medium spiny neurons.

Dysregulation of the nigrostriatal pathway is causative from Parkinson disease (PD) in humans. Toxic and/or genetic ablation of SNpc neurons produces experimental parkinsonism in mice and primates. The common features of PD and PD animal models are motor impairments (hypotonia, bradykinesia, hypokinesia).

RTT pathology, in some aspects, overlaps the motor phenotype observed in PD patients. Several neuropathological studies on postmortem brain samples argued for an SNpc alteration, evidenced by neuromelanin hypopigmentation, reduction in the structure area, and even, controversially, signs of apoptosis. In parallel, a hypometabolism was underlined by a reduction of several catecholamines (dopamine, noradrenaline, adrenaline) and their principal metabolic by-products. Mouse models of RTT are available; the most studied are constitutively deleted Mecp2 mice developed by Adrian Bird or Katelyn McCormick laboratories.

In accordance with the motor spectrum of the RTT phenotype, Mecp2-null mice show motor abnormalities from postnatal day 30 that worsen until death. These models offer a crucial substrate to elucidate the molecular and neuroanatomical correlates of MeCP2-deficiency. Recently (2008), it was shown that the conditional deletion of Mecp2 in catecholaminergic neurons (by crossing of Th-Cre mice with loxP-flanked Mecp2 ones) recapitulates a motor symptomatology; it was further documented that brain levels of Th in mice lacking MeCP2 in catecholaminergic neurons only are reduced, participating to the motor phenotype.

However, the most studied model for the evaluation of therapeutics is the Mecp2-null mouse (totally devoid of MeCP2). In this context, a reduction in the number and soma size of Th-expressing neurons is present from 5 weeks of age and is accompanied by a decrease of Th immunoreactivity in the caudate-putamen, the principal target of dopaminergic neurons arising from the SNpc. Moreover, a neurochemical analysis of dopaminergic contents in microdissected midbrain and striatal areas revealed a reduction of dopamine at five and nine weeks of age. It is noteworthy that later on (at nine weeks), the morphological parameters remain altered but not worsened, whereas the phenotype progresses and behavioral deficits are more severe. The amount of fully activated Th (Serine40-phosphorylated isoform) in neurons that remain in the SNpc is mildly affected at 5 weeks but severely impaired by 9 weeks. Finally, using a chronic and oral L-Dopa treatment on MeCP2-deficient mice, authors reported an amelioration of some of the motor deficits previously identified. Altogether, these results argue for an alteration of the nigrostriatal dopaminergic pathway in MeCP2-deficient animals as a contributor of the neuromotor deficits.There is an association of Rett syndrome with brain-derived neurotrophic factor (BDNF).

=== MECP2 ===
MECP2 protein, encoded by the MECP2 gene binds to DNA with a high affinity for CpG methylated DNA sites and affects transcription. MECP2 can bind to 5mc (5-methylcytosine) and 5hmc (5-hydroxymethylcytosine) with similar affinity, and these dinucleotides account for the majority of MECP2 binding sites in the mammalian genome. MECP2 is involved in higher order chromatin organization and appears necessary for compacting chromosomes. MECP2 binding to DNA influences mRNA splicing events. MECP2 also appears to function in DNA repair processes. MECP2-/+ deficient female mice have elevated rates of cell death when exposed to DNA damaging agents and are prone to early senescence.

=== Interactive pathway map ===
An interactive pathway map of Rett syndrome has been published.

== Diagnosis ==
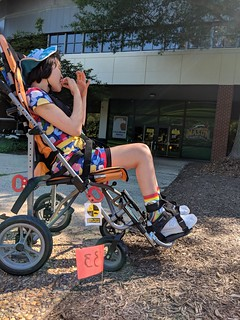
A girl with Rett syndrome mouthing her hands, a common behavior with the syndrome

Prior to the discovery of a genetic cause, Rett syndrome had been designated as a pervasive developmental disorder by the Diagnostic and Statistical Manual of Mental Disorders (DSM), together with the autism spectrum disorders. Some argued against this conclusive assignment because RTT resembles non-autistic disorders such as fragile X syndrome, tuberous sclerosis, or Down syndrome that also exhibit autistic features. After research proved the molecular mechanism, in 2013 the DSM-5 removed the syndrome altogether from classification as a mental disorder.

Rett syndrome diagnosis involves close observation of the child's growth and development to observe any abnormalities in regards to developmental milestones. A diagnosis is considered when decreased head growth is observed. Conditions with similar symptoms must first be ruled out.

There are certain criteria that must be met for the diagnosis. A blood test can rule in or rule out the presence of the MECP2 mutation, however, this mutation is present in other conditions as well.

For a classic diagnosis, all four criteria for ruling in a diagnosis must be met, as well as the two criteria for ruling out a diagnosis. Supportive criteria may also be present, but are not required for diagnosis. For an atypical or variant diagnosis, at least two of the four criteria for ruling in the diagnosis must be met, as well as five of the eleven supportive criteria. A period of symptom regression followed by recovery or symptom stabilization must also occur. Children are often misdiagnosed as having autism, cerebral palsy, or another form of developmental delay. A positive test for the MECP2 mutation is not enough to make a diagnosis.

Ruling in

- Decreased or loss of use of fine motor skills
- Decreased or loss of verbal speech
- Abnormalities during gait
- Repetitive hand movements such as wringing/squeezing or clapping/tapping

Ruling out

- Traumatic or anoxic/hypoxic brain injury, neurometabolic disease, or severe infection that may better explain symptoms
- Abnormal psychomotor development during the first six months of life

Supportive criteria

- Breathing disturbances when awake
- Bruxism while awake
- Impaired sleep pattern
- Abnormal muscle tone
- Peripheral vasomotor disturbances
- Scoliosis/kyphosis
- Growth retardation
- Small cold hands and feet
- Inappropriate laughing/screaming spells
- Diminished response to pain
- Intense eye communication (eye pointing)

=== Differential diagnosis ===
Signs of Rett syndrome that are similar to autism:

- Screaming fits
- Inconsolable crying
- Avoidance of eye contact
- Lack of social/emotional reciprocity
- Markedly impaired use of nonverbal behaviors to regulate social interaction
- Loss of speech
- Sensory problems
- Sleep regression

Signs of Rett syndrome that are also present in cerebral palsy:

- Possible short stature, sometimes with unusual body proportions because of difficulty walking or malnutrition caused by difficulty swallowing
- Hypotonia
- Delayed or absent ability to walk
- Gait/movement difficulties
- Ataxia
- Microcephaly in some - abnormally small head, poor head growth
- Gastrointestinal problems
- Some forms of spasticity
- Chorea - spasmodic movements of hand or facial muscles
- Dystonia
- Bruxism – grinding of teeth

== Treatment ==
There is no cure for Rett syndrome. Treatment is directed towards improving function and addressing symptoms. A multi-disciplinary team approach is typically used to treat the person throughout life. This team may include a primary care physician, physical therapist, occupational therapist, speech-language pathologist, nutritionist, and support services in academic and occupational settings. Some children may require special equipment and aids such as braces to arrest scoliosis, splints to modify hand movements, and nutritional programs to help them maintain adequate weight.

Because of the increased risk of sudden cardiac death, when long QT syndrome is found on an annual screening EKG it is treated with an anti-arrhythmic such as a beta-blocker. There is some evidence that phenytoin may be more effective than a beta-blocker.

While medicinal interventions to mitigate breathing challenges in children with Rett Syndrome (RTT) are still being developed, children with RTT may be prescribed rebreathing techniques (e.g., rebreathing masks), oxygen delivery, or non-invasive ventilation as preventative or rescue breathing treatments. High oxidative stress levels in individuals with RTT have exacerbated effects on their cardiorespiratory health and functionality, dramatically increasing the risk for sudden cardiac death—an anomaly that has an associated 300x increased occurrence risk in children with Rett Syndrome. Due to this, it is vital to closely monitor atypical breathing behaviors in children with RTT, making sure to effectively use lifesaving respiratory improvement devices and strategies as prescribed.

Prescribed treatment methods may vary depending on the breathing characteristic phenotype expressed by the child. Physicians have identified three major RTT breathing phenotypes; forceful breathers, feeble breathers, and apneustic breathers. For forceful breathers, for example, rebreathing masks may be used while the child is awake.

=== Trofinetide ===
Trofinetide, sold under the brand name Daybue among others, is a medication used to treat Rett syndrome. It is taken by mouth.

The most common side effects include diarrhea and vomiting.

Trofinetide was approved for medical use in the United States in 2023.

== Prognosis ==
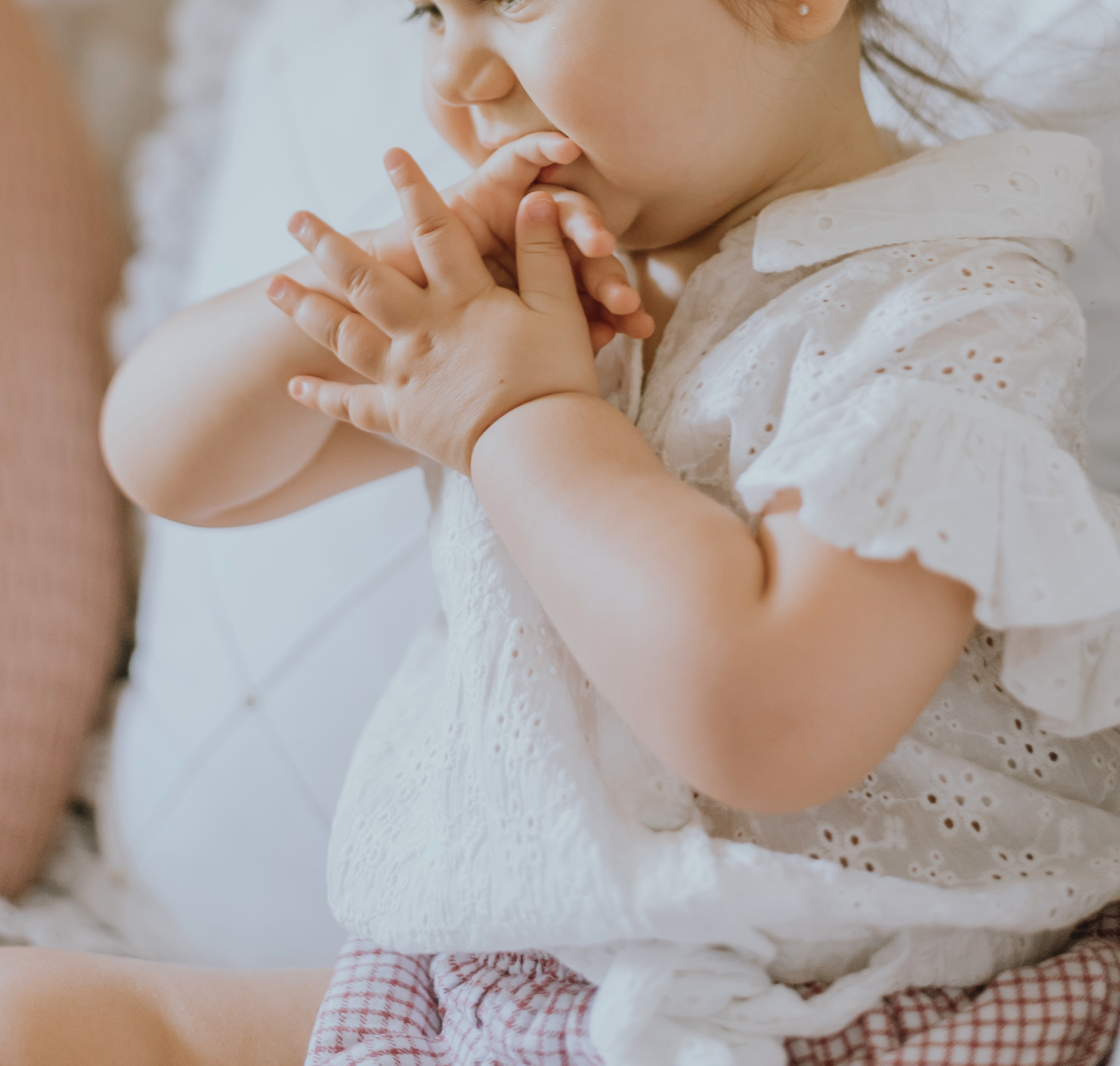
Girl with Rett syndrome with stereotyped hand movements

Male fetuses with the disorder rarely survive to term. Because the disease-causing gene is located on the X chromosome, a female born with an MECP2 mutation on her X chromosome has another X chromosome with an ostensibly normal copy of the same gene, while a male with the mutation on his X chromosome has no other X chromosome, only a Y chromosome; thus, he has no normal gene. Without a normal gene to provide normal proteins in addition to the abnormal proteins caused by a MECP2 mutation, the XY karyotype male fetus is unable to slow the development of the disease, hence the failure of many male fetuses with a MECP2 mutation to survive to term.

Males with pathogenic MECP2 mutations usually die within the first 2 years from severe encephalopathy, unless they have one or more extra X chromosomes, or have somatic mosaicism.

Females with a MECP2 mutation, however, have a non-mutant chromosome that provides them enough normal protein to survive longer. Research shows that males with Rett syndrome may result from Klinefelter's syndrome, in which the male has an XXY karyotype. Thus, a non-mutant MECP2 gene is necessary for a Rett's-affected embryo to survive in most cases, and the embryo, male or female, must have another X chromosome.

There have, however, been several cases of 46,XY karyotype males with a MECP2 mutation (associated with classical Rett syndrome in females) carried to term, who were affected by neonatal encephalopathy and died before 2 years of age. The incidence of Rett syndrome in males is unknown, partly owing to the low survival of male fetuses with the Rett syndrome-associated MECP2 mutations, and partly to differences between signs caused by MECP2 mutations and those caused by Rett's.

Females can live 40 years or more. Laboratory studies on Rett syndrome may show abnormalities such as:

- EEG abnormalities from 2 years of age
- Atypical brain glycolipids
- Elevated CSF levels of beta-endorphin and glutamate
- Reduction of substance P
- Decreased levels of CSF nerve growth factors

A high proportion of deaths are abrupt, but most have no identifiable cause; in some instances death is the result most likely of:

- Spontaneous brainstem dysfunction
- Cardiac arrest, likely due to long QT syndrome, ventricular tachycardia or other arrhythmias
- Seizures
- Gastric perforation

== History ==
Andreas Rett, a pediatrician in Vienna Austria, first described the condition in 1966. As his writings were in German, they did not become widely known in most of the medical world. Bengt Hagberg, a Swedish pediatrician, published an English article in 1983 and named the condition after Rett. In 1999, Lebanese-American physician Huda Zoghbi discovered the mutation that causes the condition.

== Research ==
Gene therapy is under study in animal models to achieve regulated expression of a normal MECP2 gene. In March 2022, Taysha Gene Therapies announced that they had received Clinical Trial Application (CTA) approval from Health Canada for a clinical trial of their investigational gene therapy for women with Rett Syndrome.

== See also ==
- CDKL5 deficiency disorder
- FOXG1 syndrome
