= Huda Zoghbi =

Lebanese scientist

Huda Yahya Zoghbi
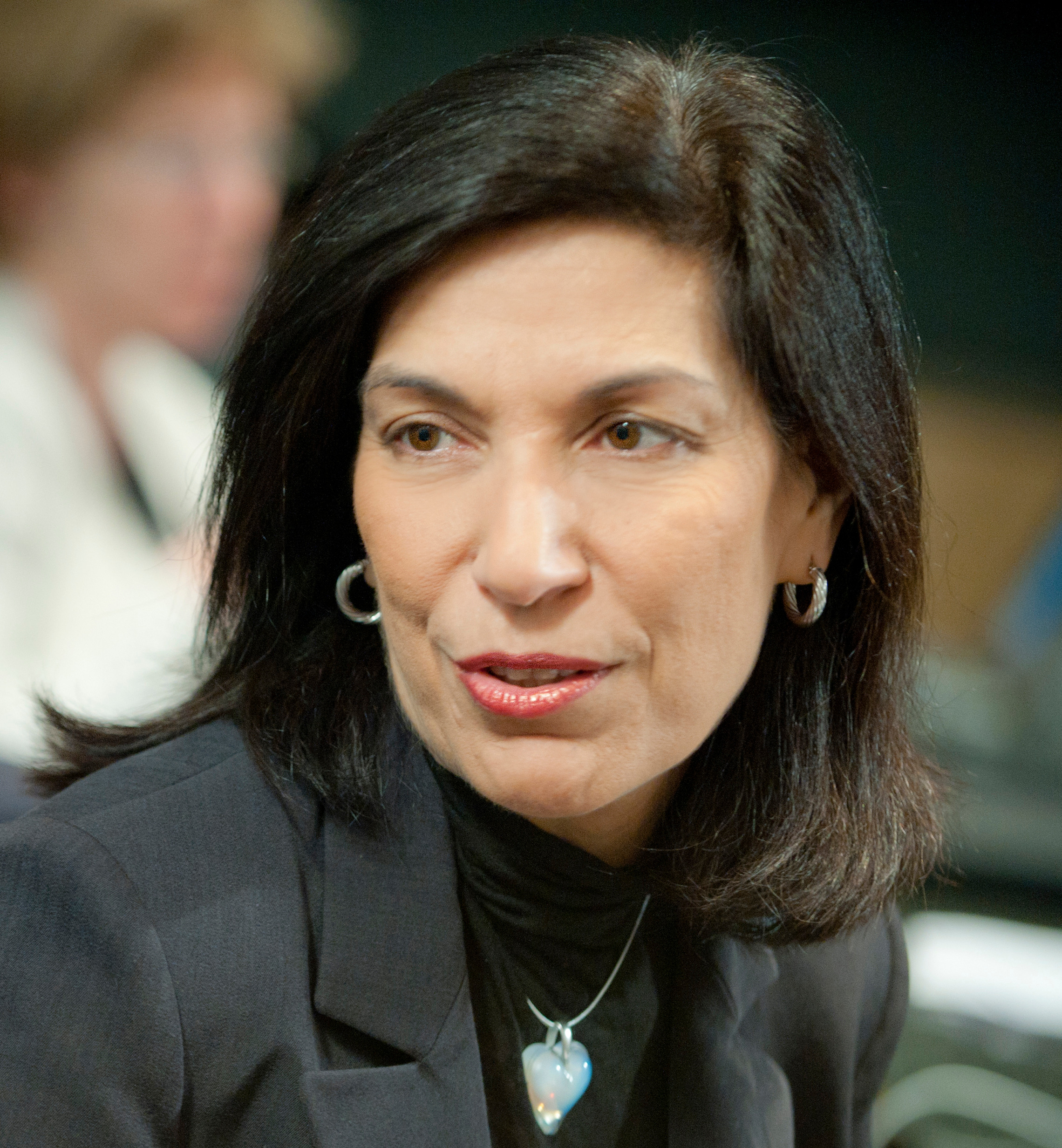
- Born: Huda El-Hibri; 20 June 1954 (age 72); Beirut, Lebanon
- Education: American University of Beirut (BS); Meharry Medical College (MD)
- Known for: Research in Rett syndrome and spinocerebellar ataxia type 1
- Spouse: William Zoghbi
- Awards: W. Alden Spencer Award (2003); Texas Women Hall of Fame (2008); Gruber Prize in Neuroscience (2011); Pearl Meister Greengard Prize (2013); Dickson Prize (2013); Shaw Prize in Life Science and Medicine (2016); Canada Gairdner International Award (2017); Breakthrough Prize in Life Sciences (2017); Brain Prize (2020); Kavli Prize (2022); Louisa Gross Horwitz Prize (2026)
- Scientific career
- Fields: Genetics; Neuroscience
- Workplaces: Regeneron Pharmaceuticals; Baylor College of Medicine; Howard Hughes Medical Institute; Texas Children's Hospital
- Doctoral advisor: Arthur Beaudet

Huda Yahya Zoghbi (Arabic: هدى الهبري الزغبي Hudā al-Hibrī az-Zughbī; born Huda El-Hibri; 20 June 1954) is a Lebanese-born American geneticist, and a professor at the Departments of Molecular and Human Genetics, Neuroscience and Neurology at the Baylor College of Medicine. She is the director of the Jan and Dan Duncan Neurological Research Institute. She was the editor of the Annual Review of Neuroscience from 2018 to 2024.

Her work helped elucidate the genes and genetic mechanisms responsible for a number of devastating neurological disorders, such as Rett syndrome and spinocerebellar ataxia type 1. Zoghbi's discoveries have provided new ways of thinking about other neurological disorders such as Parkinson's disease, Alzheimer's, autism and intellectual disability, which could lead to new therapeutics and better, more efficient treatments.

In 2017, she was awarded the Canada Gairdner International Award and the Breakthrough Prize in Life Sciences. She shared the 2020 Brain Prize with Adrian Bird for their work on Rett syndrome, and shared the 2022 Kavli Prize in Neuroscience, awarded "for pioneering the discovery of genes underlying a range of serious brain disorders".

== Early life and education ==
Huda Zoghbi was born in Beirut, Lebanon on 20 June 1954, and raised in Beirut. She loved reading works by William Shakespeare, Jane Austen and William Wordsworth in high school and intended to pursue literature at university. Her mother convinced her to study biology instead, on the grounds that 'a woman growing up in the Middle East should pick a career ensuring independence and security, while she can always write on the side'. Zoghbi was admitted as a biological sciences major at the American University of Beirut (AUB) in 1973 and entered the university's medical school 2 years later.

The Lebanese Civil War began in 1976 during her first year of medical school. Although she and her classmates decided to stay at the university, after her brother was injured by shrapnel, their parents sent them to live with their sister in Austin, Texas, with plans to return the following summer. The war, however, raged on, and Zoghbi was under the impression that school terms at American medical schools began in October, as was the case with Lebanese schools. However, in October, it was confirmed that she was still unable to return to Lebanon due to the war, and US medical schools had begun their fall term 2 months earlier. Her family friends in America suggested she apply to Vanderbilt University. Vanderbilt did not accept transfer students, but recommended Meharry Medical College instead; Meharry accepted her on the spot. Despite her continued desire to return to Lebanon the next summer, on the advice of professors at AUB, she stayed at Meharry and earned an MD degree in 1979, after which she joined the Texas Children's Hospital at the Baylor College of Medicine as a pediatric resident.

Zoghbi initially intended to specialise in pediatric cardiology. During her rotation at pediatric neurology, Marvin Fishman, the head of the division, convinced her that the brain was more interesting than the heart. She then started a 3-year term as a postdoctoral researcher in pediatric neurology after she finished her residency in 1982.

== Career ==
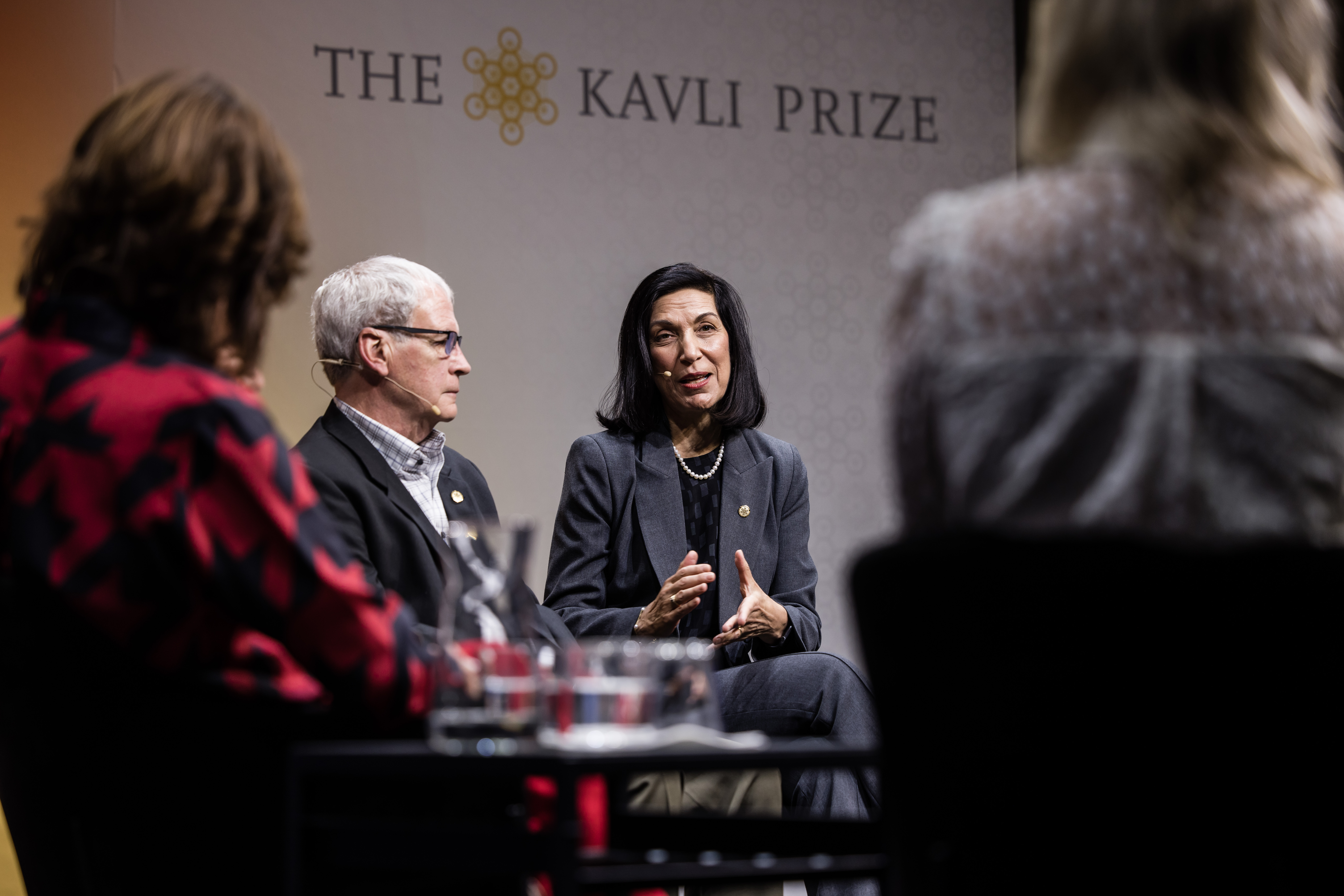
Huda Zoghbi, Kavli Prize Laureate, interviews at Munch Museum, Oslo, Norway. Photo: Thomas Eckhoff

From 1982 to 1985, Zoghbi was a postdoctoral researcher in pediatric neurology at the Baylor College of Medicine. She became an assistant professor at the Department of Pediatrics at Baylor in 1988, and was successively promoted to associate professor in 1991 and professor in 1994. At present, Zoghbi is a professor at the Department of Molecular and Human Genetics at Baylor, with appointments as a professor at the Department of Neuroscience and the Department of Pediatrics Section of Neurology and Developmental Neuroscience, the Ralph Feigin, M.D. Endowed Chair, the director of the Texas Children's Hospital Jan and Dan Duncan Neurological Research Institute, a member of the Dan L. Duncan Comprehensive Cancer Center at Baylor, and an investigator at the Howard Hughes Medical Institute. She is also a member of the board of directors of Regeneron Pharmaceuticals. She also served on the Life Sciences jury for the Infosys Prize in 2014.

== Research ==
In 1983, Zoghbi learnt of Rett syndrome from Bengt Hagberg's account in Annals of Neurology. The paper allowed Zoghbi to diagnose a five-year-old she treated at Texas Children's Hospital, and a week later she saw another patient with the same set of symptoms. When she investigated medical records, she found more cases of Rett syndrome that had been misdiagnosed. This sparked her interest in Rett syndrome, at a time when there was no report of the disease in the US. An article she published in 1985 attracted many Rett syndrome patients to Texas Children's Hospital, giving her access to a large number of cases.

Since most patients of Rett syndrome were girls, and symptoms were very consistent across patients, Zoghbi believed genetics were involved in the disease process. This led her to join Arthur Beaudet's group in 1985, after finishing her term as a postdoctoral researcher, for training in genetics and molecular biology. Beaudet advised against Rett syndrome as her research project since its mode of inheritance was still not obvious, and recommended a more approachable problem – spinocerebellar ataxia type 1, a dominantly inherited neurological disorder. In 1988, Zoghbi left Beaudet's group and founded her own lab at Baylor. In addition to her research on spinocerebellar ataxia type 1 and Rett syndrome, Zoghbi is participating in a joint research collaboration into CDKL5 Deficiency Disorder, funded by the Loulou Foundation, Baylor College of Medicine and the Jan and Dan Duncan Neurological Research Institute (NRI) at Texas Children's Hospital

=== Spinocerebellar ataxia type 1 ===
Following the establishment of her own lab, Zoghbi continued studying spinocerebellar ataxia type 1 (SCA1), in collaboration with Harry Orr from the University of Minnesota. On the same day, 8 April 1993, both Zoghbi and Orr identified ATXN1 as the gene responsible for SCA1. They determined that the disease was caused by an expansion of the glutamine-encoding CAG trinucleotide repeat in this gene, and that the younger the age of onset, the longer the CAG repeat. Further work by Zoghbi, Orr and their teams demonstrated that the misfolding, aggregation, and proteasomal degradation of the protein product of this gene, Ataxin 1, played a role in the disorder.

=== Math1 ===
After solving the etiology of spinocerebellar ataxia type 1, Zoghbi began studying animal genes related to balance. As Baylor's Hugo J. Bellen described the role of the atonal gene in balance in fruit flies (Drosophila), Zoghbi chose to study its mammalian homolog. A member of her lab successfully cloned the mouse homolog, Math1, in 1996. Her team went on to find that, in addition to its involvement in balance and coordination, Math1 is also crucial to hearing, the formation of secretory cells in the gut., and neonatal respiratory rhythm and chemosensitivity in the adult brain by regulating the development of a group of hindbrain neurons. Her lab has also shown that aberrant activation of Math1 could lead to medulloblastoma, a common childhood brain tumor, and that mice which did not express Math1, did not develop the tumor.

=== Rett syndrome ===
Since being Zoghbi was introduced to Rett syndrome early in her career, she has been working on the disorder alongside other research, despite the lack of enthusiasm from her colleagues, fellow researchers and funding agencies. The main reason is that very few individuals and even fewer families are available for investigation. In the 1990s, she collaborated with Uta Francke from Stanford University to identify the gene responsible for Rett syndrome. In 1992, she narrowed down the target to a section of the X chromosome. In 1999, a postdoctoral researcher in Zoghbi's lab identified MECP2 as the causative gene. The MECP2 protein binds methylated cytosine (5-methylcytosine) in CpG sites, and is indispensable for almost all brain cells. In the paper, she and her team demonstrated that Rett syndrome was an X-linked dominant disorder, meaning that when 1 of the 2 copies of the MECP2 gene is abnormal, Rett syndrome will result.

Zoghbi's team keeps studying MECP2, and discovered in 2004 that overexpressing the protein in mouse led to an autism-like neurological disorder. In 2009, she found mice deficient of the Mecp2 gene (the mouse homolog of human MECP2) had lower levels of norepinephrine, dopamine and serotonin, consistent with her clinical observations of patients of Rett syndrome in 1985. Recently, Zoghbi confirmed that the MECP2 protein also bound 5-methylcytosine not in CpG sites, and that restoring the level of MECP2 protein in a subset of neurons was sufficient to rescue some symptoms of Rett syndrome.

=== Ataxin-1 link to Alzheimer's ===
After linking the gene Ataxin-1 to SCA1, Zoghbi's lab was approached by Dr. Jaehong Suh of the Massachusetts General Hospital's MassGeneral Institute for Neurodegenerative Disease to investigate the connection between ataxin-1 gene and Alzheimer's disease. The subsequent study found that loss of ataxin-1 elevates BACE1 expression and Aβ pathology in mouse models, rendering it a potential contributor to risk and pathogenesis of Alzheimer's disease.

== Awards and honors ==
- 2026 – Louisa Gross Horwitz Prize (Columbia University )
- 2026 – Nancy Lurie Marks Prize for Autism Research, inaugural recipient, awarded by the Lurie Autism Institute of Penn Medicine and Children's Hospital of Philadelphia.
- 2024 – Member of the American Academy of Sciences & Letters, invested at the Library of Congress in Washington, D.C., on 23 October 2024.
- 2022 – Kavli Prize in Neuroscience.
- 2020 – Brain Prize
- 2019 – Victor A. McKusick Leadership Award, American Society of Human Genetics
- 2018 – Member of the American Academy of Arts and Sciences
- 2018 – Ross Prize in Molecular Medicine, Molecular Medicine
- 2018 – National Order of the Cedar, Lebanon
- 2017 – Breakthrough Prize in Life Sciences
- 2017 – Canada Gairdner International Award
- 2016 – Jessie Stevenson Kovalenko Medal
- 2016 – Shaw Prize in Life Science and Medicine
- 2015 – Mechthild Esser Nemmers Prize in Medical Science, Northwestern University
- 2015 – Vanderbilt Prize in Biomedical Science, Vanderbilt University School of Medicine
- 2015 – Javits Neuroscience Investigator Award, National Institute of Neurological Disorders and Stroke (NINDS), National Institutes of Health
- 2015 – American Task Force for Lebanon Award
- 2015 – Mortimer D. Sackler, M.D. Prize for Distinguished Achievement in Developmental Psychobiology, Weill Cornell Medicine and Columbia University College of Physicians and Surgeons
- 2014 – Honorary Doctor of Medical Sciences, Yale University
- 2014 – March of Dimes Prize in Developmental Biology
- 2014 – Edward M. Scolnick Prize in Neuroscience, McGovern Institute for Brain Research, Massachusetts Institute of Technology
- 2013 – Dickson Prize in Medicine, University of Pittsburgh
- 2013 – Pearl Meister Greengard Prize, Rockefeller University
- 2011 – Gruber Prize in Neuroscience
- 2011 – Vita and Lee Lyman Dewey Tuttle Brookwood Legacy Award for Excellence and Partnership in Medicine, Brookwood Community
- 2009 – International Rett Syndrome Foundation's Circle of Angels Research Award
- 2009 – Vilcek Prize for Biomedical Research, Vilcek Foundation
- 2009 – Marion Spencer Fay Award, Drexel University College of Medicine
- 2009 – Cathedra Laboris, University of Monterrey
- 2008 – Honorary Doctor of Science, Meharry Medical College
- 2008 – Texas Women's Hall of Fame
- 2007 – Perl-UNC Neuroscience Prize
- 2007 – Massachusetts Institute of Technology Arab Students' Organization Science and Technology Lifetime Achievement Award
- 2007 – Honorary Doctor of Science, Middlebury College
- 2007 – Robert J. and Claire Pasarow Foundation Award in Neuropsychiatry Research
- 2004 – Member of the National Academy of Sciences
- 2004 – Neuronal Plasticity Prize, Ipsen Foundation
- 2004 – Marta Philipson Award in Pediatrics, Philipson Foundation for Research
- 2003 - W. Alden Spencer Award (Columbia University)
- 2002 – Fellow of the American Association for the Advancement of Science
- 2002 – Raymond D. Adams Lectureship, American Neurological Association
- 2001 – Bernard Sachs Award, Society for Pediatric Research
- 2000 – Member of the National Academy of Medicine (formerly the Institute of Medicine)
- 1998 – Sidney Carter Award, American Academy of Neurology
- 1998 – Soriano Lectureship, American Neurological Association
- 1998 – Javits Award, NINDS, National Institutes of Health
- 1996 – E. Mead Johnson Award, Society of Pediatric Research
- 1995 – Kilby International Award

== Personal life ==
Zoghbi met her husband, William Zoghbi when they were medical students in the American University of Beirut. In 1977, she continued her medical school study in Meharry Medical College, and William transferred to Meharry next year. They both had their residencies in the Baylor College of Medicine after graduation. They married in 1980 and have 2 children. William is the chief of the Department of Cardiology at Houston Methodist Hospital.
