= PQBP1 =

Protein-coding gene in the species Homo sapiens

Identifiers
- Aliases: PQBP1, MRX2, MRX55, MRXS3, MRXS8, NPW38, RENS1, SHS, polyglutamine binding protein 1
- External IDs: OMIM: 300463; MGI: 1859638; GeneCards: PQBP1
Available structures
PDB	Ortholog search: PDBe RCSB
PDB	List of PDB id codes 4BWQ, 4BWS, 4CDO

Gene location (Human)
Chr.	X chromosome (human)
Band	Xp11.23	Start	48,890,197 bp
Band	Xp11.23	End	48,903,402 bp

Gene location (Mouse)
Chr.	X chromosome (mouse)
Band	X A1.1|X 3.56 cM	Start	7,760,758 bp
Band	X A1.1|X 3.56 cM	End	7,765,508 bp
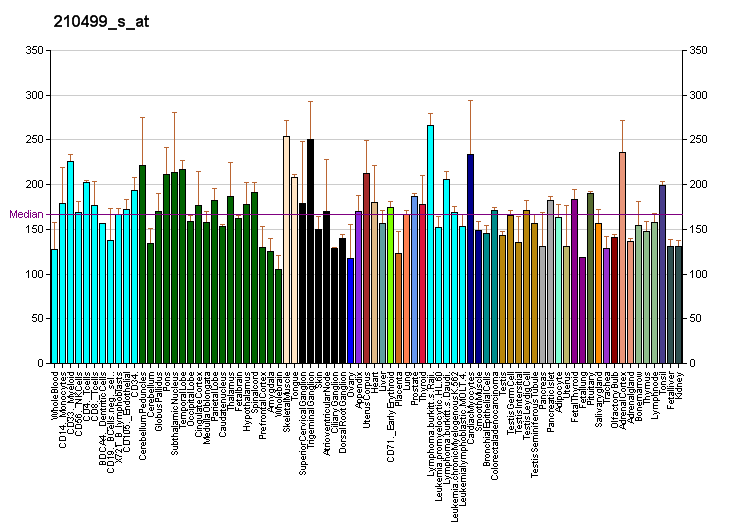

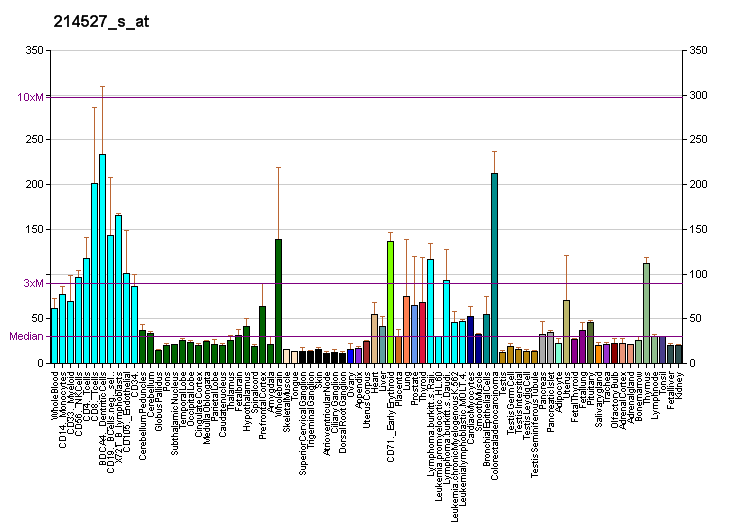

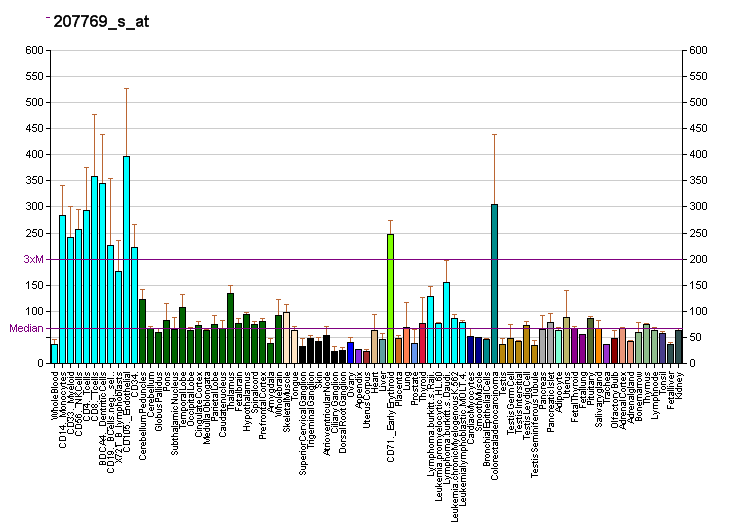
RNA expression pattern
Bgee	Human / Mouse (ortholog); Top expressed in: left ovary; right ovary; cerebellar hemisphere; right hemisphere of cerebellum; granulocyte; anterior pituitary; body of pancreas; monocyte; body of stomach; tendon of biceps brachii / Top expressed in: saccule; otic placode; external carotid artery; internal carotid artery; superior cervical ganglion; otic vesicle; fossa; suprachiasmatic nucleus; motor neuron; condyle; More reference expression data
BioGPS	More reference expression data
Gene ontology
Molecular function	DNA binding; transcription coactivator activity; protein binding; ribonucleoprotein complex binding; double-stranded DNA binding
Cellular component	neuronal ribonucleoprotein granule; cytoplasmic stress granule; nucleus; nucleoplasm; cytoplasm; cytosol; nuclear speck
Biological process	regulation of transcription, DNA-templated; mRNA processing; transcription, DNA-templated; regulation of dendrite morphogenesis; regulation of RNA splicing; RNA splicing; neuron projection development; alternative mRNA splicing, via spliceosome; mRNA splicing, via spliceosome; activation of innate immune response; positive regulation of defense response to virus by host; positive regulation of type I interferon production; defense response to virus; cellular response to exogenous dsRNA; immune system process; innate immune response; positive regulation of nucleic acid-templated transcription
Sources:Amigo / QuickGO
Orthologs
Databases	NCBI: entry; OMA: entry
Species	Human	Mouse
Entrez	10084	54633
Ensembl	ENSG00000102103	ENSMUSG00000031157
UniProt	O60828	Q91VJ5
RefSeq (mRNA)	NM_001032381; NM_001032382; NM_001032383; NM_001032384; NM_001032385 NM_001167989; NM_001167990; NM_001167992; NM_005710; NM_144494; NM_144495	NM_001252528; NM_001252529; NM_019478
RefSeq (protein)	NP_001027553; NP_001027554; NP_001027555; NP_001027556; NP_001161461 NP_001161462; NP_001161464; NP_005701; NP_652766	NP_001239457; NP_001239458; NP_062351
Location (UCSC)	Chr X: 48.89 – 48.9 Mb	Chr X: 7.76 – 7.77 Mb
PubMed search
- Wikidata
View/Edit Human	View/Edit Mouse

Polyglutamine-binding protein 1 (PQBP1) is a protein that in humans is encoded by the PQBP1 gene.

Polyglutamine binding protein-1, which was identified as a binding protein to the polyglutamine tract sequence, is an evolutionally conserved protein expressed in various tissues including developmental and adult brains or mesodermal tissues. In cells, PQBP1 is dominantly located in the nucleus but also in the cytoplasm dependently on the cell type and stress conditions. PQBP1 has recently been found to play a role in the innate immune response of dendritic cells.

It should be of note that PQBP1 has no relationship with QBP1, an artificial synthetic peptide.

== Function ==
PQBP1 is a nuclear polyglutamine-binding protein that contains a WW domain.

The molecular roles of PQBP1 are mainly in mRNA splicing and transcription. PQBP1 interacts with splicing proteins and RNA-binding proteins. PQBP1 deficiency critically affects mRNA splicing of cell cycle and synapse related genes. Recent results indicated implication of PQBP1 in cytoplasmic RNA metabolism and elongation of protein translation from mRNA. Research also seems to suggest that PQBP1 also plays a role in the innate immune system as a necessary adaptor for the cGAS-mediated innate response to lentiviruses such as HIV1. This PQBP-1 dependent response initiates a sensor that detects lentiviral DNA.

== Clinical significance ==
Mutations in the PQBP1 gene, which encodes for this protein, have been known to cause X-linked intellectual disabilities (XLID), commonly referred to as Renpenning's syndrome. Recent studies indicate that PQBP-1 interaction with TXNL4A is missing in patients with frameshift mutations causing Renpenning's syndrome. PQBP-1 seems to facilitate the nuclear import of TXNL4A, however the biological function of that interaction requires further investigation. People who suffer from these disabilities share a common set of symptoms including: microcephaly, shortened stature and impaired intellectual development. There are 11 types of mutations that have been identified, but the most common being frameshift mutations. Other syndromic XLIDs such as Golabi-Ito-Hall syndrome and non-syndromic ID patients were also associated with PQBP1 gene mutations.

Mutant Ataxin-1 and Huntingtin, disease proteins of spinocerebellar ataxia type-1 and Huntington's disease respectively, interact with PQBP1 and disturbed the functions of PQBP1. Moreover, recent investigations revealed pathological roles of PQBP1 in neurons and microglia under neurodegeneration of Alzheimer's disease and tauopathy. SRRM2 phosphorylation detected in neurons at the early stage of Alzheimer's disease pathology leads to reduction of SRRM2, a scaffold protein for RNA metabolism related molecules in the nucleus, which causes reduction of PQBP1 in the nucleus and acquired intellectual disability. PQBP1 was shown as an intracellular receptor for HIV1 in dendritic cells for innate immune system. Recent studies indicate that PQBP1 recognizes intact capsids of HIV-1 particles. It interacts with these capsids through its amino-terminus, and when capsid disassembles it triggers the PQBP-1 dependent recruitment of cGAS. This is crucial to activating the sensor that detects HIV-1 DNA as soon as synthesis is initiated. Similarly, PQBP1 functions as an intracellular receptor for tau proteins and trigger brain inflammation.

== Animal models ==
Mouse models of knockdown and conditional knockout were generated, and they showed cognitive impairment and microcephaly. The KD mice possess a transgene expressing 498 bp double-strand RNA that is endogenously cleaved to siRNA suppressing PQBP1 efficiently, and did not show obvious developmental abnormality. Another knockdown model of the gene in mouse embryo primary neurons revealed a decrease in splicing efficiency and resulted in abnormal gastrulation and neuralation patterning.

Drosophila models of underexpression and overexpression were also generated. The hypomorph Drosophila model revealed molecular function of PQBP1 in learning acquisition mediated by decreased mRNA and protein expressions of NMDA receptor subunit NR1. Research indicates that in order to appropriately function, the protein must be expressed within a critical range.
