= HMGB1 =

Mammalian protein found in Homo sapiens

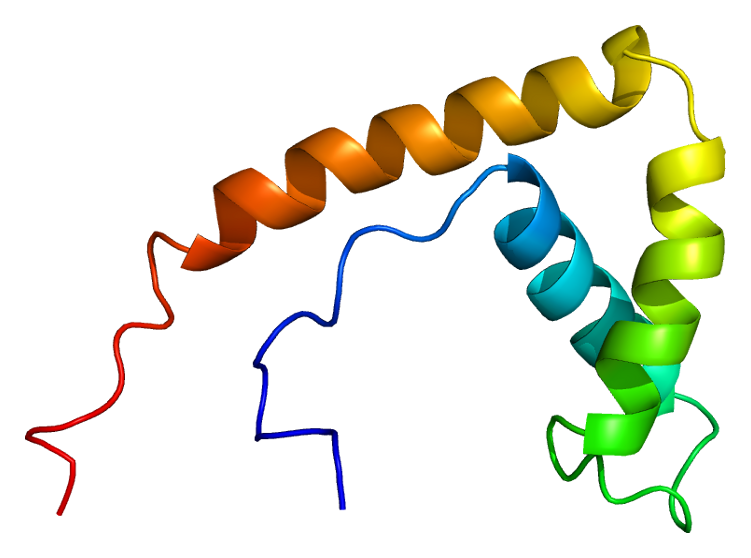

Identifiers
- Aliases: HMGB1, HMG1, HMG3, SBP-1, HMG-1, high mobility group box 1, HMGB-1
- External IDs: OMIM: 163905; GeneCards: HMGB1
Available structures
PDB	Human UniProt search: PDBe RCSB
PDB	List of PDB id codes 2LY4, 2RTU, 2YRQ

Gene location (Human)
Chr.	Chromosome 13 (human)
Band	13q12.3	Start	30,456,704 bp
Band	13q12.3	End	30,617,597 bp
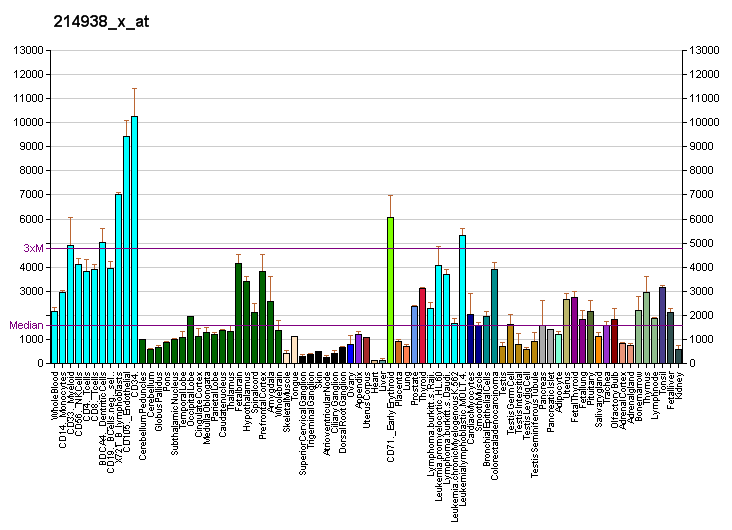

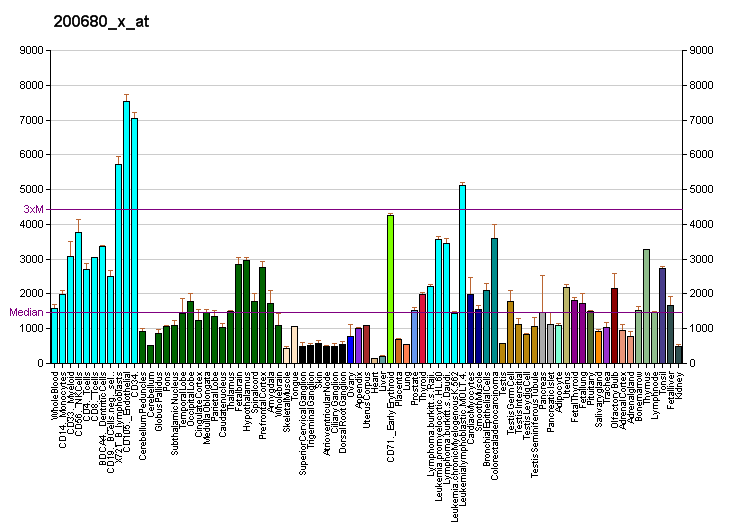

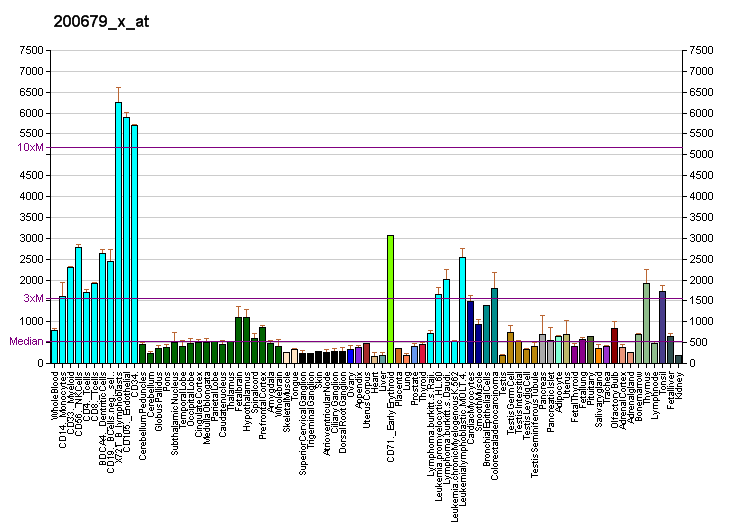
RNA expression pattern
Bgee	Human / Mouse (ortholog); Top expressed in: ventricular zone; ganglionic eminence; Achilles tendon; smooth muscle tissue; body of uterus; appendix; trabecular bone; rectum; C1 segment; canal of the cervix / n/a; More reference expression data
BioGPS	More reference expression data
Gene ontology
Molecular function	DNA-binding transcription factor activity; bubble DNA binding; DNA polymerase binding; C-X-C chemokine binding; transcription factor binding; phosphatidylserine binding; lipopolysaccharide binding; lyase activity; single-stranded DNA binding; damaged DNA binding; protein binding; DNA binding, bending; supercoiled DNA binding; DNA binding; four-way junction DNA binding; RAGE receptor binding; chemoattractant activity; RNA binding; double-stranded DNA binding; double-stranded RNA binding; single-stranded RNA binding; cytokine activity; calcium-dependent protein kinase regulator activity; protein kinase activator activity; transcription coactivator activity; integrin binding
Cellular component	cytoplasm; endosome; membrane; transcription repressor complex; extracellular region; nucleus; cell surface; plasma membrane; nucleoplasm; chromosome; condensed chromosome; endoplasmic reticulum-Golgi intermediate compartment; secretory granule lumen; ficolin-1-rich granule lumen; extracellular space; early endosome; neuron projection; alphav-beta3 integrin-HMGB1 complex
Biological process	T-helper 1 cell activation; apoptotic DNA fragmentation; adaptive immune response; regulation of transcription by RNA polymerase II; positive regulation of DNA ligation; positive regulation of JNK cascade; cellular response to DNA damage stimulus; apoptotic cell clearance; positive regulation of cysteine-type endopeptidase activity involved in apoptotic process; positive regulation of toll-like receptor 9 signaling pathway; negative regulation of RNA polymerase II transcription preinitiation complex assembly; positive regulation of dendritic cell differentiation; positive regulation of DNA binding; neuron projection development; negative regulation of blood vessel endothelial cell migration; positive regulation of interleukin-12 production; positive regulation of monocyte chemotaxis; activation of innate immune response; DNA ligation involved in DNA repair; innate immune response; inflammatory response; DNA repair; positive regulation of MAPK cascade; positive regulation of activated T cell proliferation; DNA geometric change; DNA recombination; inflammatory response to antigenic stimulus; positive regulation of interleukin-10 production; immune system process; negative regulation of transcription by RNA polymerase II; regulation of restriction endodeoxyribonuclease activity; chemotaxis; positive regulation of mismatch repair; negative regulation of CD4-positive, alpha-beta T cell differentiation; positive regulation of cytosolic calcium ion concentration; T-helper 1 cell differentiation; dendritic cell chemotaxis; autophagy; neutrophil clearance; V(D)J recombination; positive regulation of apoptotic process; DNA topological change; positive chemotaxis; toll-like receptor signaling pathway; neutrophil degranulation; eye development; myeloid dendritic cell activation; positive regulation of protein phosphorylation; endothelial cell proliferation; plasmacytoid dendritic cell activation; macrophage activation involved in immune response; regulation of tolerance induction; regulation of T cell mediated immune response to tumor cell; base-excision repair; regulation of autophagy; lung development; activation of protein kinase activity; positive regulation of interferon-alpha production; positive regulation of interferon-beta production; positive regulation of interleukin-6 production; positive regulation of tumor necrosis factor production; positive regulation of toll-like receptor 2 signaling pathway; positive regulation of toll-like receptor 4 signaling pathway; endothelial cell chemotaxis; positive regulation of innate immune response; positive regulation of myeloid cell differentiation; positive regulation of glycogen catabolic process; regulation of protein kinase activity; positive regulation of transcription by RNA polymerase II; response to glucocorticoid; positive regulation of ERK1 and ERK2 cascade; positive regulation of wound healing; positive regulation of NIK/NF-kappaB signaling; positive regulation of sprouting angiogenesis; negative regulation of apoptotic cell clearance; regulation of nucleotide-excision repair; regulation of signaling receptor activity; chromatin remodeling; positive regulation of autophagy; developmental process; positive regulation of blood vessel endothelial cell migration; cell chemotaxis; cellular response to lipopolysaccharide; positive regulation of vascular endothelial cell proliferation; negative regulation of interferon-gamma production; positive regulation of monocyte chemotactic protein-1 production; cellular response to interleukin-7
Sources:Amigo / QuickGO
Orthologs
Databases	NCBI: entry; OMA: entry
Species	Human	Mouse
Entrez	3146	n/a
Ensembl	ENSG00000189403	n/a
UniProt	P09429	n/a
RefSeq (mRNA)	NM_001313892; NM_001313893; NM_002128	n/a
RefSeq (protein)	NP_001300821; NP_001300822; NP_002119; NP_001350590; NP_001357268 NP_001357269; NP_001357270; NP_001300821.1; NP_001300822.1; NP_002119.1	n/a
Location (UCSC)	Chr 13: 30.46 – 30.62 Mb	n/a
PubMed search		n/a
- Wikidata
View/Edit Human

High mobility group box 1 protein, also known as high-mobility group protein 1 (HMG-1) and amphoterin, is a protein that in humans is encoded by the HMGB1 gene.

HMG-1 belongs to the high mobility group and contains a HMG-box domain.

== Function ==
Like the histones, HMGB1 is among the most important chromatin proteins. In the nucleus HMGB1 interacts with nucleosomes, transcription factors, and histones. This nuclear protein organizes the DNA and regulates transcription. After binding, HMGB1 bends DNA, which facilitates the binding of other proteins. HMGB1 supports transcription of many genes in interactions with many transcription factors. It also interacts with nucleosomes to loosen packed DNA and remodel the chromatin. Contact with core histones changes the structure of nucleosomes.

The presence of HMGB1 in the nucleus depends on posttranslational modifications. When the protein is not acetylated, it stays in the nucleus, but hyperacetylation on lysine residues causes it to translocate into the cytosol.

HMGB1 has been shown to play an important role in helping the RAG endonuclease form a paired complex during V(D)J recombination.

== Role in inflammation ==
HMGB1 is secreted by immune cells (e.g. macrophages, monocytes and dendritic cells) through leaderless secretory pathway. Activated macrophages and monocytes secrete HMGB1 as a cytokine mediator of inflammation. Antibodies that neutralize HMGB1 confer protection against damage and tissue injury during arthritis, colitis, ischemia, sepsis, endotoxemia, and systemic lupus erythematosus. The mechanism of inflammation and damage consists of binding to toll-like receptor TLR2 and TLR4, which mediates HMGB1-dependent activation of macrophage cytokine release. This positions HMGB1 at the intersection of sterile and infectious inflammatory responses.

ADP-ribosylation of HMGB1 by PARP1 inhibits removal of apoptotic cells, thereby sustaining inflammation. TLR4 binding by HMGB1 or lipopolysaccharide (LPS) sustains ADP-ribosylation of HMGB1 by PARP1 thereby serving as an amplification loop for inflammation.

HMGB1 has been proposed as a DNA vaccine adjuvant. HMGB1 released from tumour cells was demonstrated to mediate anti-tumour immune responses by activating toll-like receptor 2 (TLR2) signaling on bone marrow-derived GBM-infiltrating DCs.

== Interactions ==
HMGB1 has to interact with p53.

HMGB1 is a nuclear protein that binds to DNA and acts as an architectural chromatin-binding factor. It can also be released from cells, an extracellular form in which it may bind to toll-like receptors (TLRs) or an inflammatory receptor called the receptor for advanced glycation end-products RAGE. Release from cells seems to involve two distinct processes: necrosis, in which case cell membranes are permeabilized and intracellular constituents may diffuse out of the cell; and some form of active or facilitated secretion induced by signaling through the NF-κB. HMGB1 also translocates to the cytosol under stressful conditions such as increased ROS inside the cells. Under such conditions, HMGB1 promotes cell survival by sustaining autophagy through interactions with beclin-1. It is largely considered as an antiapoptotic protein.

HMGB1 can interact with TLR ligands and cytokines, and activates cells through the multiple surface receptors including TLR2, TLR4, and RAGE.

=== Interaction via TLR4 ===
Some actions of HMGB1 are mediated through the toll-like receptors (TLRs). Interaction between HMGB1 and TLR4 results in upregulation of NF-κB, which leads to increased production and release of cytokines. HMGB1 is also able to interact with TLR4 on neutrophils to stimulate the production of reactive oxygen species by NADPH oxidase. HMGB1-LPS complex activates TLR4, and causes the binding of adapter proteins (MyD88 and others), leading to signal transduction and the activation of various signaling cascades. The downstream effect of this signaling is to activate MAPK and NF-κB, and thus cause the production of inflammatory molecules such as cytokines.

== Clinical significance ==
HMGB1 has been proposed as a target for cancer therapy, as well as a vector for reducing inflammation from SARS-CoV-2 infection. It also serves as a biomarker for post-COVID-19 condition.

The neurodegenerative disease spinocerebellar ataxia type 1 (SCA1) is caused by mutation in the ataxin 1 gene. In a mouse model of SCA1, mutant ataxin 1 protein mediated the reduction or inhibition of HMGB1 in the mitochondria of neurons. HMGB1 regulates DNA architectural changes essential for repair of DNA damage. In the SCA1 mouse model, over-expression of the HMGB1 protein by means of an introduced virus vector bearing the HMGB1 gene facilitated repair of the mitochondrial DNA damage, ameliorated the neuropathology and the motor defects of the SCA1 mice, and also extended their lifespan. Thus impairment of HMGB1 function appears to have a key role in the pathogenesis of SCA1.

Recently, a study provided evidence of an association between raised levels of HMGB1 and attention to detail and systemizing in unmedicated children with high-functioning autism spectrum disorder (ASD), suggesting that inflammatory processes mediated by HMGB1 may play a role in the disruption of neurobiological mechanisms regulating cognitive processes in ASD. In this study, HMGB1 serum concentrations in children with ASD were found significantly higher than those of typically developing children. Additionally, HMGB1 serum concentrations were positively correlated with the Autistic quotient (AQ) attention to detail score and the Systemizing Quotient (SQ) total score in the ASD group. However, comprehensive evidence in children is limited, highlighting the need for in-depth research towards understanding possible mechanisms linking HMGB1 with the core features of ASD. Nevertheless, it has been suggested that HMGB1 could be a reliable inflammatory marker, explaining the link between inflammatory processes and several autistic traits, and therefore a possible therapeutic target in this neurodevelopmental disorder.
