= UBE2E1 =

Protein-coding gene in the species Homo sapiens

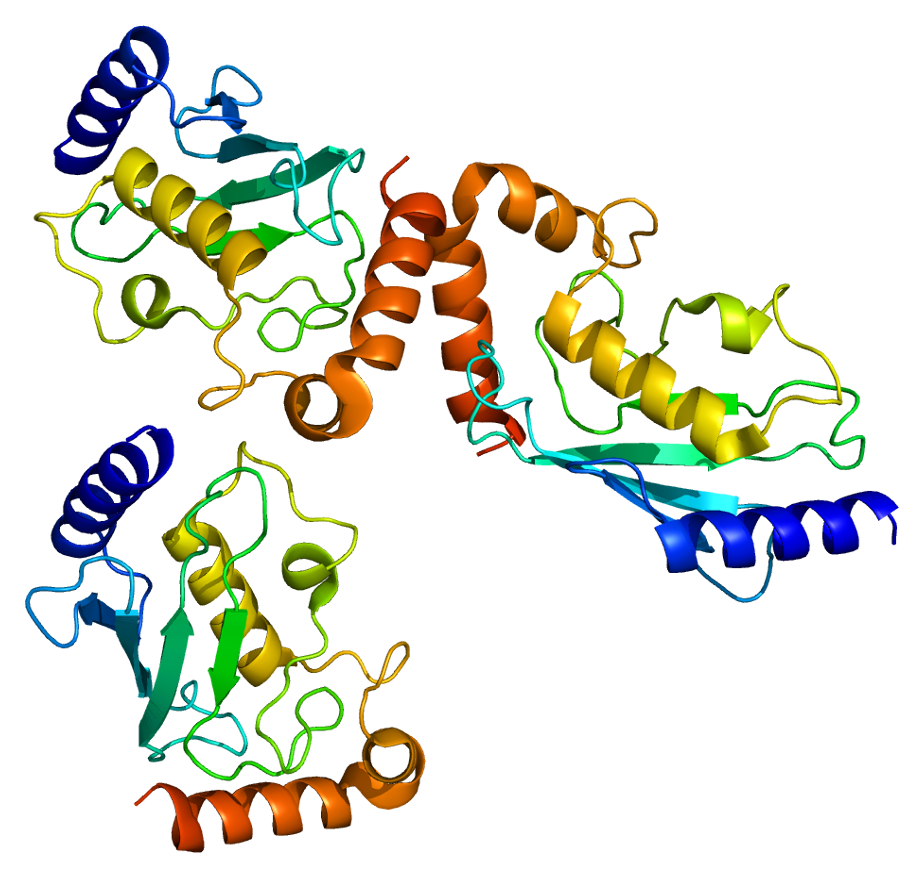

Identifiers
- Aliases: UBE2E1, UBCH6, ubiquitin conjugating enzyme E2 E1
- External IDs: OMIM: 602916; MGI: 107411; GeneCards: UBE2E1
Available structures
PDB	Ortholog search: PDBe RCSB
PDB	List of PDB id codes 1XR9, 3BZH, 4JJQ
Enzyme activity
EC #	BRENDA	ExPASy	KEGG	MetaCyc
2.3.2.23	↗	↗	↗	↗
2.3.2.24	↗	↗	↗	↗

Gene location (Human)
Chr.	Chromosome 3 (human)
Band	3p24.2	Start	23,805,955 bp
Band	3p24.2	End	23,891,640 bp

Gene location (Mouse)
Chr.	Chromosome 14 (mouse)
Band	14|14 A1	Start	4,137,837 bp
Band	14|14 A1	End	4,186,974 bp
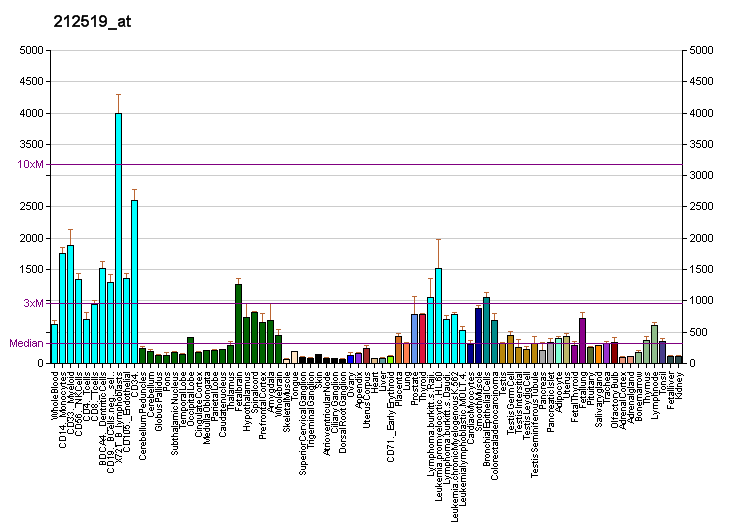
RNA expression pattern
Bgee	Human / Mouse (ortholog); Top expressed in: cartilage tissue; oral cavity; ventricular zone; embryo; skin of arm; superficial temporal artery; bronchial epithelial cell; mucosa of paranasal sinus; pons; lower lobe of lung / Top expressed in: otic placode; otic vesicle; saccule; mammillary body; ventral tegmental area; dorsomedial hypothalamic nucleus; arcuate nucleus; paraventricular nucleus of hypothalamus; nasal epithelium; olfactory epithelium; More reference expression data
BioGPS	More reference expression data
Gene ontology
Molecular function	transferase activity; nucleotide binding; ISG15 transferase activity; ubiquitin-protein transferase activity; protein binding; ATP binding; ubiquitin conjugating enzyme activity
Cellular component	cytosol; ubiquitin ligase complex; nucleoplasm; nucleus
Biological process	histone monoubiquitination; ubiquitin-dependent protein catabolic process; protein polyubiquitination; protein K48-linked ubiquitination; ISG15-protein conjugation; anaphase-promoting complex-dependent catabolic process; histone H2B ubiquitination; protein ubiquitination; regulation of mitotic cell cycle phase transition
Sources:Amigo / QuickGO
Orthologs
Databases	NCBI: entry; OMA: entry
Species	Human	Mouse
Entrez	7324	22194
Ensembl	ENSG00000170142	ENSMUSG00000021774
UniProt	P51965	P52482
RefSeq (mRNA)	NM_001202476; NM_003341; NM_182666	NM_009455
RefSeq (protein)	NP_001189405; NP_003332; NP_872607; NP_003332.1	NP_033481
Location (UCSC)	Chr 3: 23.81 – 23.89 Mb	Chr 14: 4.14 – 4.19 Mb
PubMed search
- Wikidata
View/Edit Human	View/Edit Mouse

Ubiquitin-conjugating enzyme E2 E1 is a protein that in humans is encoded by the UBE2E1 gene.

== Function ==
The modification of proteins with ubiquitin is an important cellular mechanism for targeting abnormal or short-lived proteins for degradation. Ubiquitination involves at least three classes of enzymes: ubiquitin-activating enzymes, or E1s, ubiquitin-conjugating enzymes, or E2s, and ubiquitin-protein ligases, or E3s. This gene encodes a member of the E2 ubiquitin-conjugating enzyme family. Two alternatively spliced transcript variants encoding distinct isoforms have been found for this gene.

== Interactions ==
UBE2E1 has been shown to interact with Ataxin 1 and NEDD4.
