= Renpenning's syndrome =

- Renpenning's syndrome is inherited in an X-linked recessive manner.
- Specialty: Medical genetics

Renpenning's syndrome is a neurodevelopmental disorder recognised in males that causes intellectual disability, mild growth retardation with examples in the testes and head, and a somewhat short stature. The condition only affects males, starting at birth.

== Presentation ==
People with Renpenning's typically begin learning language at an ordinary pace, but by the age of 3–4 they experience a regression in mental and physical development, such as mild low muscle tone resulting in elongated faces and a rapid loss in the normal growth of the head (microcephaly). Small testes and short stature are also known to commonly occur.

== Genetics ==
It is associated with mutations in the PQBP1 gene. The gene product is a polyglutamine-binding protein involved in transcription and pre-mRNA splicing. The gene itself is located on the short arm of the X chromosome (Xp11.23). The most common mutations causing this condition occur in exon 4.

== Diagnosis ==
This diagnosis may be suspected on clinical grounds but should be confirmed by sequencing the PQBP1 gene.

== Treatment ==
There is no specific or curative treatment for this condition at present. Management is supportive

== Epidemiology ==
This condition normally only occurs in males but a case in a female has been reported.

== History ==
This condition was first characterized in 1962 and later described by Hans Renpenning in 1963 after he documented these traits on many children in one family alone.

== See also ==
- Lujan-Fryns syndrome
- Fragile x syndrome
