= Arthur Beaudet =

American geneticist

Arthur L. Beaudet
- Born: 1942 (age 83–84); Woonsocket, Rhode Island, U.S.
- Education: College of the Holy Cross (BS); Yale University (MD)
- Awards: William Allan Award (1997)
- Scientific career
- Fields: Molecular genetics
- Workplaces: Baylor College of Medicine
- Thesis: Differences in RNA codon recognition as a function of cellular tRNA content (1967)
- Notable students: Huda Zoghbi

Arthur L. Beaudet (born 1942) is an American physician-scientist known for his research in human genetics. He is the Henry and Emma Meyer Professor of Molecular and Human Genetics at the Baylor College of Medicine, where he is a joint professor of molecular biology, cell biology, and pediatrics and was previously the chairman of the Department of Molecular and Human Genetics.

Beaudet was inducted into the Institute of Medicine in 1995, the Society of Scholars in 2008, and into the National Academy of Sciences in 2011. He was previously the president of the American Society of Human Genetics.

== Early life and education ==
Beaudet was born in Woonsocket, Rhode Island. He was raised Catholic, served as an altar boy, and had an interest in baseball during his childhood.

Beaudet graduated from the College of the Holy Cross in Worcester, Massachusetts, with a Bachelor of Science in biology, magna cum laude, in 1963. He then earned his Doctor of Medicine (M.D.), cum laude, from the Yale School of Medicine in 1967. During his junior year of medical school, he was elected to the Alpha Omega Alpha medical honor society. While still a medical student in 1966, Beaudet began conducting research in human and mammalian genetics as a summer student at the National Institutes of Health (NIH), working in the laboratory of C. Thomas Caskey within a research unit headed by Marshall Nirenberg. His medical dissertation at Yale was titled, "Differences in RNA codon recognition as a function of cellular tRNA content".

After medical school, Beaudet completed his internship and residency in pediatrics at the Harriet Lane Pediatric Service of the Johns Hopkins School of Medicine, finishing in 1969. He then returned to the NIH as a full-time research associate, again working with Caskey in Nirenberg's research group, where his work included studies of protein translation. Beaudet remained at the NIH for two years, from 1969 to 1971.

== Academic career ==
Beaudet joined the faculty of the Baylor College of Medicine in 1971, when he and C. Thomas Caskey were recruited from the NIH to lead Baylor's developing program in genetics. In 1976, they established a clinical training program for investigators in genetics and biomedical research.

When Baylor established an Institute for Molecular Genetics in 1985 and converted it into the Department of Molecular and Human Genetics in 1994, Beaudet became chair of the department in 1995 and remained in that position until 2014. He was appointed to Baylor's Henry and Emma Meyer Chair in Molecular Genetics in 1996. He also held professorships in pediatrics and molecular and cellular biology and served as an investigator with the Howard Hughes Medical Institute. He stepped down as chair in 2014.

Beaudet served as the president of the American Society of Human Genetics (ASHG) in 1998. He was also an editor of the sixth through eighth editions of The Metabolic and Molecular Bases of Inherited Disease, and served on a number of scientific editorial boards and national review panels. He was elected to the Institute of Medicine in 1995 and to the National Academy of Sciences in 2011. ASHG awarded him the William Allan Award for lifetime contributions to human genetics in 2007 and the Victor A. McKusick Leadership Award in 2017. In 2008, Johns Hopkins University elected Beaudet to its Society of Scholars, which recognizes former Hopkins trainees who subsequently achieved distinction in their fields.

In 2020, Beaudet left Baylor to serve as founder and chief executive officer of Luna Genetics, a genetic testing company. He returned to Baylor in 2024 as a professor in the Department of Molecular and Human Genetics.

== Research ==
Beaudet began his research in the 1960s with studies on protein synthesis. In the 1970s, Beaudet et al. demonstrated mutations in cultured somatic cells; he has also conducted much research on inborn errors of metabolism, particularly urea cycle disorders. In 1988, Beaudet's laboratory published a paper regarding the mechanism by which uniparental disomy might cause certain types of human genetic disease. This paper proposed four mechanisms for uniparental disomy, each of which has since been shown to occur. His group co-discovered that the UBE3A gene was inactivated as the cause of Angelman syndrome, and that deletion of the snoRNAs likely contributes to the Prader-Willi phenotype. In collaboration with Isis (now Ionis) Pharmaceuticals he demonstrated that oligonucleotides could be used to activate the paternal allele of Ube3a in the mouse as a possible therapeutic correction in Angelman syndrome.

Beaudet has published research on the possible association between the deficiency of a carnitine biosynthesis gene and risk of autism in boys, and has contended that some of these cases of autism may be preventable through carnitine supplementation. Beaudet has also developed a test which enables doctors to detect whether or not a child was conceived as a result of incest without testing either parent. Beaudet has worked for over a decade trying to develop a commercial form of cell-based noninvasive prenatal testing using fetal cells in the mother’s blood during the first trimester.
