= TXNL4A =

Protein-coding gene in the species Homo sapiens

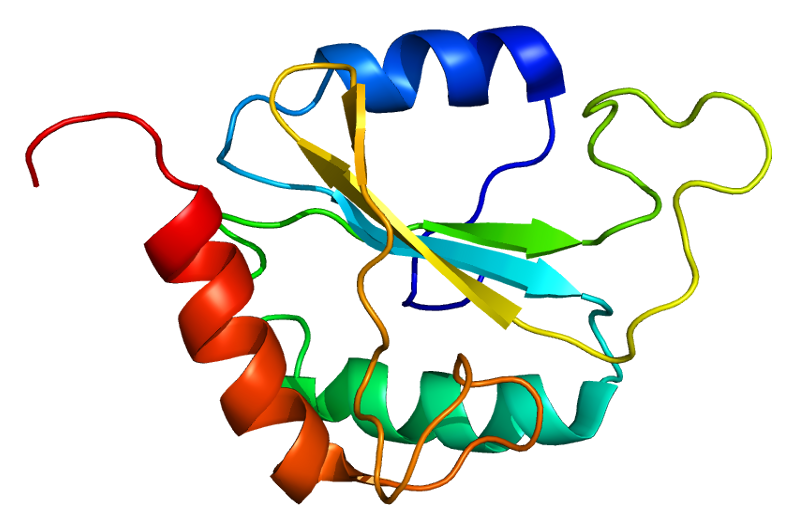

Identifiers
- Aliases: TXNL4A, DIB1, DIM1, HsT161, SNRNP15, TXNL4, U5-15kD, BMKS, thioredoxin like 4A
- External IDs: OMIM: 611595; MGI: 1351613; GeneCards: TXNL4A
Available structures
PDB	Ortholog search: PDBe RCSB
PDB	List of PDB id codes 1PQN, 1QGV, 1SYX, 4BWQ, 4BWS, 4CDO, 3JCR

Gene location (Human)
Chr.	Chromosome 18 (human)
Band	18q23	Start	79,970,813 bp
Band	18q23	End	80,033,949 bp
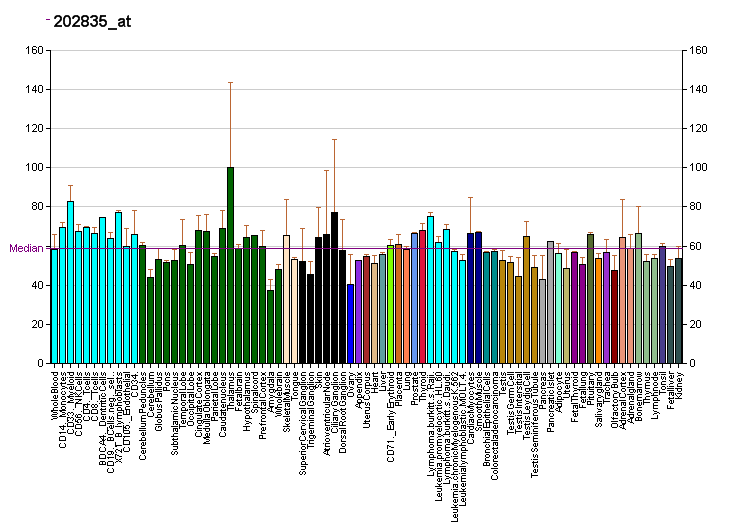

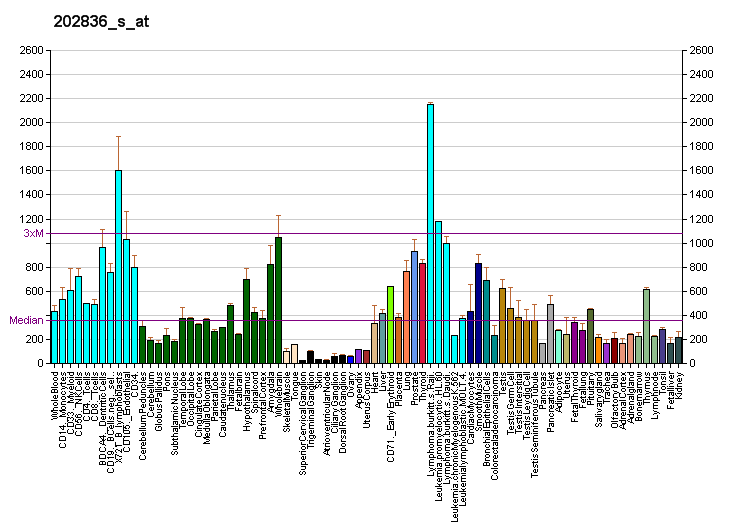
RNA expression pattern
Bgee	Human / Mouse (ortholog); Top expressed in: parotid gland; amygdala; right testis; left testis; endothelial cell; anterior pituitary; C1 segment; prefrontal cortex; gingival epithelium; right frontal lobe / n/a; More reference expression data
BioGPS	More reference expression data
Gene ontology
Molecular function	protein binding
Cellular component	U5 snRNP; spliceosomal complex; nucleoplasm; nucleus; cytosol; nuclear membrane; U4/U6 x U5 tri-snRNP complex; U2-type precatalytic spliceosome
Biological process	RNA splicing, via transesterification reactions; mRNA splicing, via spliceosome; cell cycle; mRNA processing; spliceosomal complex assembly; cell division; RNA splicing
Sources:Amigo / QuickGO
Orthologs
Databases	NCBI: entry; OMA: entry
Species	Human	Mouse
Entrez	10907	27366
Ensembl	ENSG00000141759	ENSMUSG00000057130
UniProt	P83876	P83877
RefSeq (mRNA)	NM_001303471; NM_001305557; NM_001305563; NM_001305564; NM_006701	NM_001038608; NM_001042408; NM_001042409; NM_025299; NM_178604
RefSeq (protein)	NP_001290400; NP_001292486; NP_001292492; NP_001292493; NP_006692	NP_001033697; NP_001035867; NP_079575; NP_848719; NP_001371102 NP_001371103; NP_001371104; NP_001371105; NP_001371106
Location (UCSC)	Chr 18: 79.97 – 80.03 Mb	n/a
PubMed search
- Wikidata
View/Edit Human	View/Edit Mouse

Thioredoxin-like protein 4A is a protein that is encoded by the TXNL4A gene in humans.

== Interactions ==
TXNL4A has been shown to interact with PQBP1.
