= William Zoghbi =

Lebanese-American cardiologist

William A. Zoghbi (born October 28, 1955) is a Lebanese-American cardiologist. He is Professor of Medicine at the Houston Methodist Institute for Academic Medicine, in Houston Texas, and Weill Cornell Medical College. He holds the Elkins Family Distinguished Chair in Cardiac Health at the Houston Methodist DeBakey Heart & Vascular Center. Zoghbi is the Chairman of the Department of Cardiology at Houston Methodist Hospital. He is a Master of the American College of Cardiology and served as its president in 2012.

== Early life and education ==
William Zoghbi was born in Beirut, Lebanon, to a Lebanese Christian family. He attended Collège de la Sagesse, a French and Catholic international school in Beirut, where he developed a love of math and physics that inclined him toward engineering. But an encounter with a medical student sparked his interest in medicine, and he graduated from the American University of Beirut (AUB) in 1975 with high distinction in Biology and Chemistry. He met his future wife, Huda, at the AUB Faculty of Medicine, as they were both beginning their medical school education.

By the end of their first academic year, the Lebanese Civil War had broken out. Huda's parents sent her to visit relatives in the United States for safety while William returned to his family home in Ghazir, a small city just north of Beirut, safe from the war. The political situation deteriorated, however, and the borders closed, stranding Huda in the US. She was accepted to Meharry Medical College in Nashville, Tennessee. William completed his second year of medical school at AUB amidst the bombing and transferred to Meharry the following year.

After earning his M.D., Zoghbi did his internship in Internal Medicine at the University of Texas Medical Branch in Galveston, Texas, followed by residency and Cardiology fellowship at Baylor College of Medicine in Houston. He undertook advanced training in echocardiography under the mentorship of Dr. Miguel Quinones.

== Career ==
William Zoghbi joined the faculty of the Section of Cardiology in the Department of Internal Medicine at Baylor College of Medicine in 1985. He is board certified in internal medicine, cardiovascular diseases, and echocardiography.

In 1989 he became the Associate Director of the Echocardiography Laboratory at Houston Methodist and served as its Director from 2002-2010. In 1994 he was appointed Deputy Medical Director of the Department of Internal Medicine. In 2004 he was awarded the John S. Dunn Sr. Endowed Chair in Echocardiography and served as Acting Chief of Cardiology at Baylor.

In 2004 after an administrative split between Baylor College of Medicine and Methodist Hospital, The Methodist Hospital formed an academic affiliation with Weill Cornell Medical College and New York Presbyterian Hospital to foster academic advancement and clinical training. In 2005, Zoghbi joined Houston Methodist and established a Cardiovascular Imaging Institute. He also received the William L. Winters Chair in Cardiovascular Imaging at Houston Methodist DeBakey Heart and Vascular Center. In 2014, Zoghbi became the Elkins Family Distinguished Chair in Cardiac Health at Houston Methodist DeBakey Heart & Vascular Center and was appointed Chair of Cardiology at Houston Methodist in 2016.

Zoghbi has been involved with the American College of Cardiology (ACC), the American Heart Association, and the American Society of Echocardiography (ASE) since 1985. He served as President of the ASE in 2008-2009 and President of the American College of Cardiology in 2012-2013; he served on the ACC Board of Trustees from 2001-2015.

During his ACC presidency, he promoted the practice of educating patients and encouraging them to be actively involved in their own healthcare. For example, one of his major endeavors was to spearhead the re-launch of CardioSmart.org as a resource for patients and the public as well as health care professionals. He represented the ACC and the global cardiovascular community at meetings of the United Nations and World Health Organization, advocating for a 25% reduction in premature mortality from non-communicable diseases by 2025.

Zoghbi served on the board of the World Heart Federation from 2014 to 2015 and co-chaired the Global Task Force for Cardiovascular disease for the World Heart Federation.

Zoghbi has served as associate editor of the journal Circulation, as Section Editor for Global Health for the Journal of the American College of Cardiology, and Deputy Editor of the Journal of the American College of Cardiology–Cardiovascular Imaging. He served on the editorial board of the journal Global Heart.

== Awards ==
- Richard Popp Excellence in Teaching Award, the American Society of Echocardiography, 2004
- Ben Qurrah Award, National Arab American Medical Association (NAAMA), 2018
- Honorary Doctorate of Humane Letters, conferred by Lebanese American University June 2022.

== Personal life ==
Zoghbi is married to neurogeneticist Huda Y. Zoghbi. Together they have two children. In 2012, William carried the torch for the 2012 London Olympic Games through Bicester, England
