= Ataxin 1 =

Protein-coding gene in the species Homo sapiens

ATXN1
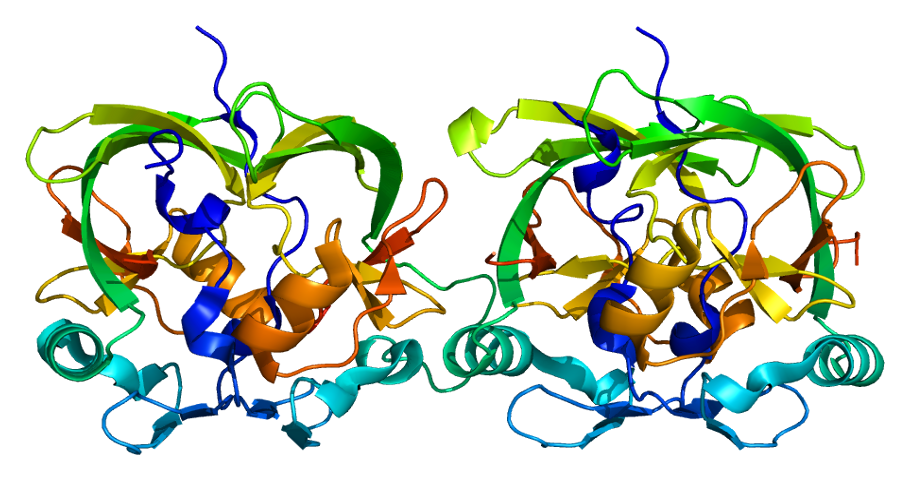

Identifiers
- Aliases: ATXN1, ATX1, D6S504E, SCA1, ataxin 1
- External IDs: OMIM: 601556; MGI: 104783; GeneCards: ATXN1
Available structures
| PDB | Ortholog search: PDBe RCSB |
| PDB | List of PDB id codes 1OA8, 4APT, 4AQP, 4J2J, 4J2L, 2M41 |

Gene location (Human)
| Chr. | Chromosome 6 (human) |
| Band | 6p22.3 | Start | 16,299,112 bp |
| Band | 6p22.3 | End | 16,761,491 bp |

Gene location (Mouse)
| Chr. | Chromosome 13 (mouse) |
| Band | 13 A5|13 21.98 cM | Start | 45,703,231 bp |
| Band | 13 A5|13 21.98 cM | End | 46,118,484 bp |
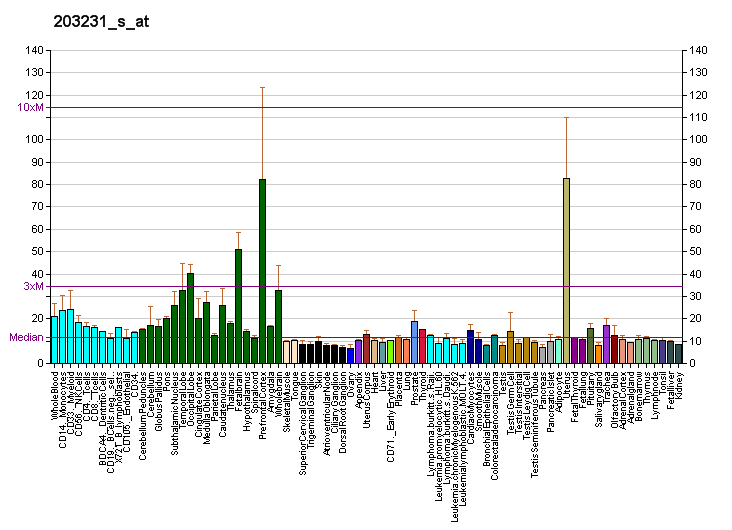

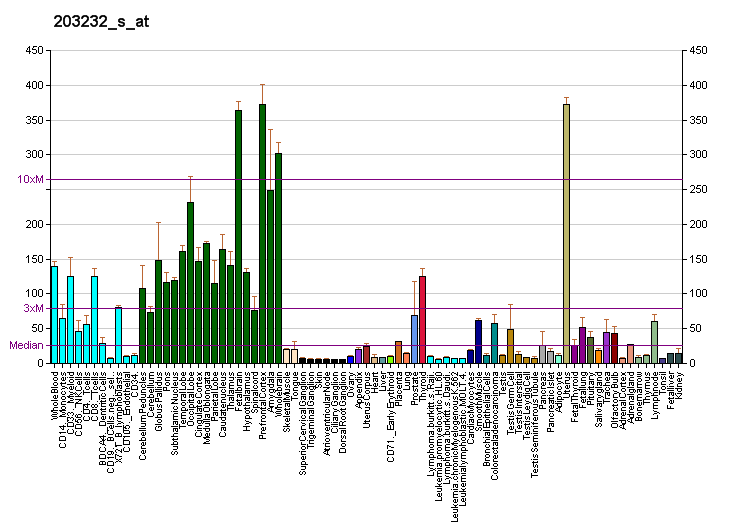
RNA expression pattern
| Bgee | Human / Mouse (ortholog); Top expressed in: endothelial cell; Brodmann area 23; Skeletal muscle tissue of rectus abdominis; germinal epithelium; orbitofrontal cortex; Brodmann area 46; epithelium of colon; biceps brachii; Skeletal muscle tissue of biceps brachii; cartilage tissue / Top expressed in: dorsal striatum; medial dorsal nucleus; lateral geniculate nucleus; medial geniculate nucleus; olfactory tubercle; lateral septal nucleus; parotid gland; nucleus accumbens; temporal muscle; triceps brachii muscle; More reference expression data |
| BioGPS | More reference expression data |
Gene ontology
| Molecular function | poly(G) binding; protein self-association; DNA binding; RNA binding; protein C-terminus binding; protein binding; identical protein binding; poly(U) RNA binding |
| Cellular component | cytoplasm; nuclear matrix; nuclear inclusion body; nuclear RNA export factor complex; nucleus; nucleoplasm; nucleolus; cytosol |
| Biological process | nuclear export; RNA processing; negative regulation of transcription, DNA-templated; regulation of transcription, DNA-templated; transcription, DNA-templated; brain development; learning; memory; social behavior; negative regulation of transcription by RNA polymerase II; lung alveolus development; nervous system development; anatomical structure development |
Sources:Amigo / QuickGO
Orthologs
| Databases | NCBI: entry; OMA: entry |
| Species | Human | Mouse |
| Entrez | 6310 | 20238 |
| Ensembl | ENSG00000124788 | ENSMUSG00000046876 |
| UniProt | P54253 | P54254 |
| RefSeq (mRNA) | NM_001128164; NM_000332; NM_001357857 | NM_001199304; NM_001199305; NM_009124 |
| RefSeq (protein) | NP_000323; NP_001121636; NP_001344786 | NP_001186233; NP_001186234; NP_033150 |
| Location (UCSC) | Chr 6: 16.3 – 16.76 Mb | Chr 13: 45.7 – 46.12 Mb |
| PubMed search |
- Wikidata
| View/Edit Human | View/Edit Mouse |

Ataxin-1 is a DNA-binding protein which in humans is encoded by the ATXN1 gene.

Mutations in ataxin-1 cause spinocerebellar ataxia type 1, an inherited neurodegenerative disease characterized by a progressive loss of cerebellar neurons, particularly Purkinje neurons.

== Genetics ==
ATXN1 is conserved across multiple species, including humans, mice, and Drosophila.

In humans, ATXN1 is located on the short arm of chromosome 6. The gene contains 9 exons, two of which are protein-coding. There is a CAG repeat in the coding sequence which is longer in humans than other species (6-38 uninterrupted CAG repeats in healthy humans versus 2 in the mouse gene). This repeat is prone to errors in DNA replication and can vary widely in length between individuals.

== Structure ==
Notable features of the Ataxin-1 protein structure include:

- A polyglutamine tract of variable length, encoded by the CAG repeat in ATXN1.
- A region which mediates protein-protein interactions, known as the AXH domain
- A nuclear localization sequence
- A phosphorylation site which regulates the protein's stability and interactions with its binding partners

== Function ==
The function of Ataxin-1 is not completely understood. It appears to be involved in regulating gene expression based on its location in the nucleus of the cell, its association with promoter regions of several genes, and its interactions with transcriptional regulators and parts of the RNA splicing machinery.

== Interactions ==
Ataxin 1 has been shown to interact with:

- C2orf27,
- Coilin,
- Glyceraldehyde 3-phosphate dehydrogenase,
- CIC
- UBE2E1, and
- USP7.

== Role in disease ==
ATXN1 is the gene mutated in spinocerebellar ataxia type 1 (SCA1), a dominantly-inherited, fatal genetic disease in which neurons in the cerebellum and brain stem degenerate over the course of years or decades. SCA1 is a trinucleotide repeat disorder caused by expansion of the CAG repeat in ATXN1; this leads to an expanded polyglutamine tract in the protein. This elongation is variable in length, with as few as 6 and as many as 81 repeats reported in humans. Repeats of 39 or more uninterrupted CAG triplets cause disease, and longer repeat tracts are correlated with earlier age of onset and faster progression.

How polyglutamine expansion in Ataxin-1 causes neuronal dysfunction and degeneration is still unclear. Disease likely occurs through the combination of several processes.

=== Aggregation ===
Mutant Ataxin-1 protein spontaneously misfolds and forms aggregates in cells, much like other disease-associated proteins such as tau, Aβ, and huntingtin. This led to the hypothesis that the aggregates are toxic to neurons, but it has been shown in mice that aggregation is not required for pathogenesis. Other neuronal proteins can modulate the formation of Ataxin-1 aggregates and this in turn may affect aggregate-induced toxicity.

=== Altered protein-protein interactions ===
Soluble Ataxin-1 interacts with many other proteins. Polyglutamine expansion in Ataxin-1 can affect these interactions, sometimes causing loss of function (where the protein fails to perform one of its normal functions) and sometimes causing toxic gain of function (where the protein binds too strongly or to an inappropriate target). This, in turn, could alter the expression of the genes ataxin-1 regulates, leading to disease.

=== HMGB1 interaction ===
Mutant ataxin1 causes the neurodegenerative disease spinocerebellar ataxia type 1 (SCA1). In a mouse model of SCA1, mutant ataxin1 mediates the reduction or inhibition of the high mobility group box1 protein (HMGB1) in neuron mitochondria. HMGB1 is a crucial nuclear protein that regulates DNA architectural changes essential for DNA damage repair and transcription. The impairment of HMGB1 function leads to increased mitochondrial DNA damage. In the SCA1 mouse model, over-expression of the HMGB1 protein by means of an introduced virus vector bearing the HMGB1 gene facilitates repair of the mitochondrial DNA damage, ameliorates the neuropathology and the motor deficits, and extends the lifespan of these mutant ataxin1 mice.
