= Ataxin 1 like =

Protein-coding gene in the species Homo sapiens

ATXN1L

Identifiers
- Aliases: ATXN1L, BOAT, BOAT1, ataxin 1 like
- External IDs: OMIM: 614301; MGI: 3694797; GeneCards: ATXN1L

Gene location (Human)
Chr.	Chromosome 16 (human)
Band	16q22.2	Start	71,808,439 bp
Band	16q22.2	End	71,885,268 bp

Gene location (Mouse)
Chr.	Chromosome 8 (mouse)
Band	8 D3|8 57.22 cM	Start	110,453,083 bp
Band	8 D3|8 57.22 cM	End	110,464,371 bp
RNA expression pattern
Bgee	Human / Mouse (ortholog); Top expressed in: endothelial cell; pancreatic epithelial cell; pancreatic ductal cell; cardiac muscle tissue of right atrium; myocardium of left ventricle; oocyte; tibialis anterior muscle; mucosa of ileum; parotid gland; secondary oocyte / Top expressed in: ascending aorta; aortic valve; zygote; secondary oocyte; otolith organ; utricle; superior cervical ganglion; ciliary body; primary oocyte; retinal pigment epithelium; More reference expression data
BioGPS	n/a
Gene ontology
Molecular function	DNA binding; protein binding; RNA binding
Cellular component	dendrite; cell projection; nucleolus; nucleus; nucleoplasm
Biological process	positive regulation of hematopoietic stem cell proliferation; lung alveolus development; extracellular matrix organization; regulation of transcription, DNA-templated; negative regulation of transcription by RNA polymerase II; transcription, DNA-templated; brain development; learning; memory; social behavior; nervous system development; anatomical structure development
Sources:Amigo / QuickGO
Orthologs
Databases	NCBI: entry; OMA: entry
Species	Human	Mouse
Entrez	342371	52335
Ensembl	ENSG00000224470	ENSMUSG00000069895
UniProt	P0C7T5	P0C7T6
RefSeq (mRNA)	NM_001137675	NM_001080930; NM_001368350; NM_001368351; NM_001368352
RefSeq (protein)	NP_001131147	NP_001074399; NP_001355279; NP_001355280; NP_001355281
Location (UCSC)	Chr 16: 71.81 – 71.89 Mb	Chr 8: 110.45 – 110.46 Mb
PubMed search
- Wikidata
View/Edit Human	View/Edit Mouse

Ataxin 1 like is a protein that in humans is encoded by the ATXN1L gene.
