= LINC03124 =

Non-coding RNA found in humans

Long independently transcribed non-coding RNA 3124 is a non-coding RNA that in humans is encoded by the gene LINC03124 (previously C2orf27 or C2orf27A).

== Gene ==
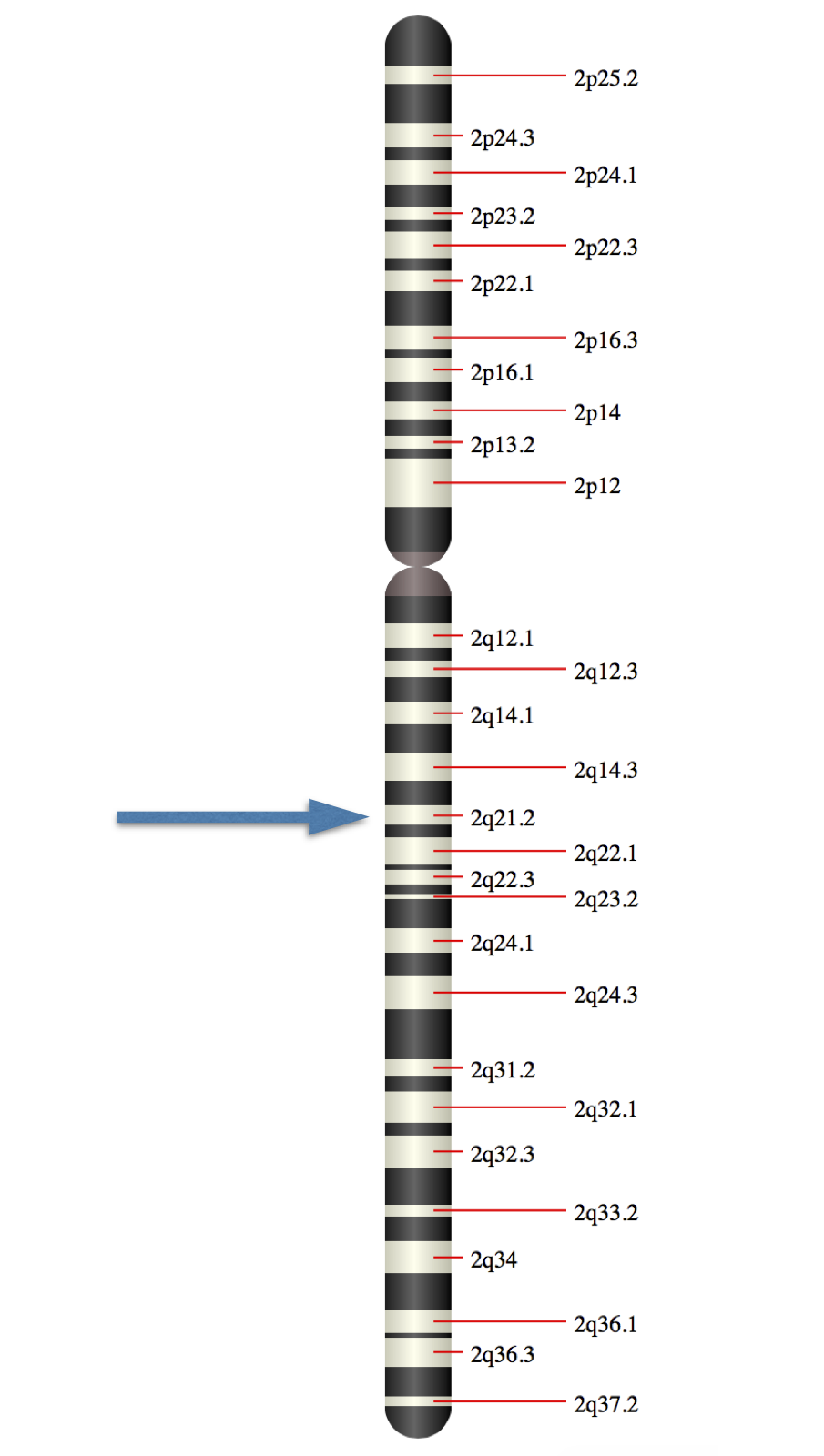
The general location where the gene C2orf27A is on chromosome 2. Reference:

The mRNA is 1,222bp in length and is located at 2q21.2 with a total of five exons in Homo sapiens. Other sources list C2orf27B as a paralog but this is unlikely because both genes are located in the same place on chromosome 2. It seems to be generally accepted that they are the same gene. Other gene aliases include C2orf27 and chromosome 2 open reading frame 27A. The gene is surrounded upstream by POTEKP and downstream by ANKRD30BL.

== Evolutionary history ==
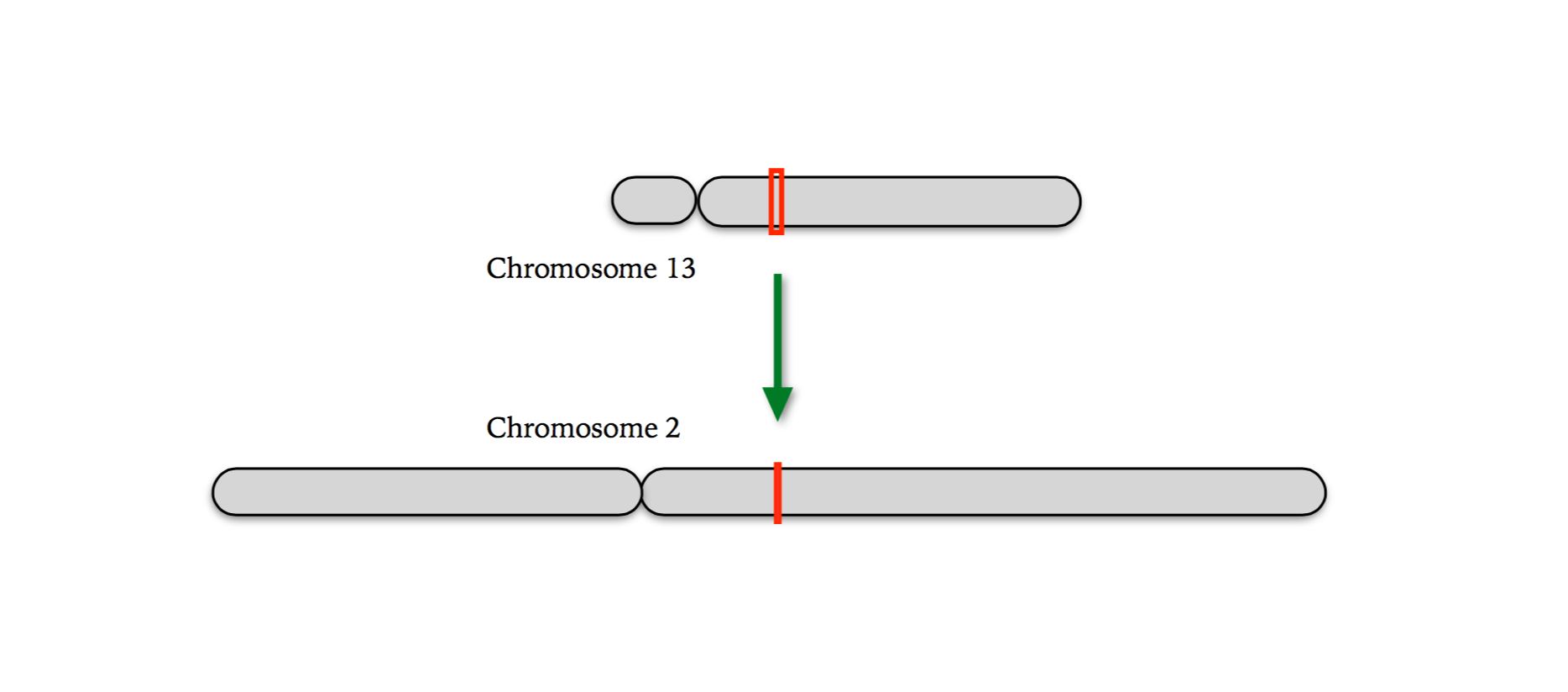
Given that NBEA is present in mainly mammals, gene duplication is believed to originate from chromosome 13 to chromosome 2. The duplication event involves the exons 2, 9, and 10 of chromosome 13 onto chromosome 2, becoming exons 1, 2, and 3 of C2orf27A.

This gene is found in primates but is also found at a very poor E-values in other mammals and organisms like fish, invertebrates, fungi, bacteria, or plants. The protein C2orf27, however, is strictly found only in primates like chimpanzees, gorillas, and baboons.

When comparing the mRNA of C2orf27A with the exclusion of primates, it is shown that there is a high similarity with a gene called neurobeachin (NBEA) NBEA. When taking a look at this connection between the two, it was found that NBEA was on a different reading frame than C2orf27A which already begins to rule out any similarity between the two. This was confirmed based upon the fact that when comparing both of these protein sequences, it resulted in a 44% similarity in a 1% query cover. These protein sequences are entirely different suggesting that their functions may not be similar. It was also discovered when comparing the alignment of the sequences, it was shown that a duplication event occurred between NBEA and C2orf27A. NBEA is present on chromosome 13 but a section of this mRNA corresponds, with a 96% similarity score, with exons one through four on C2orf27 of chromosome 2. This may be an example of a gene duplication event.

Taking all of this into account, the duplication of NBEA into chromosome 2 to form C2orf27 may be the divergence point of the gene becoming strictly present in primates only.
