= Spinocerebellar ataxia type 1 =

Rare neurodegenerative disorder

- Other names: SCA1, Schut's disease
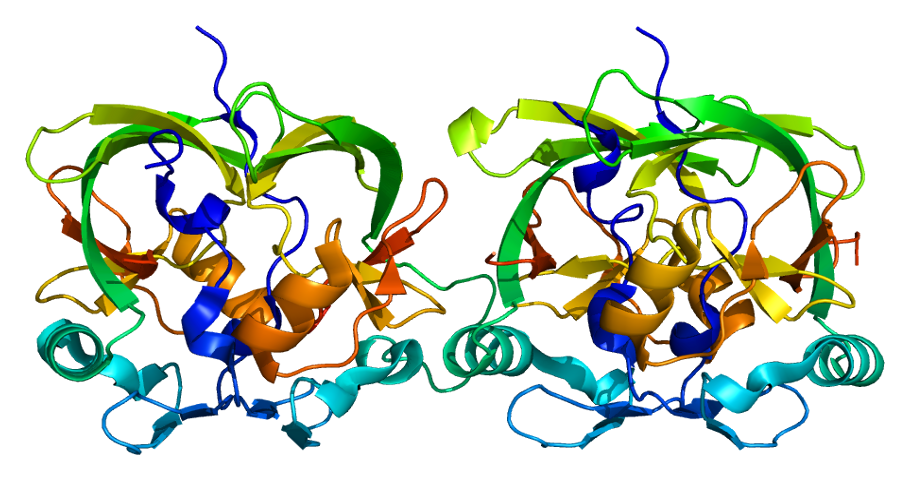
- AXH domain of Ataxin 1
- Specialty: Neurology
- Symptoms: Ataxia of gait and stance, hypermetric saccades, dysarthria, dysphagia
- Complications: Pneumonia, physical injury from falls
- Usual onset: Between 3rd and 4th decade
- Duration: Long term
- Causes: Genetic
- Diagnostic method: Genetic testing
- Prognosis: 10–30 years from onset
- Frequency: 1–2 per 100,000

Spinocerebellar ataxia type 1 (SCA1) is a rare autosomal dominant disorder, which, like other spinocerebellar ataxias, is characterized by neurological symptoms including dysarthria, hypermetric saccades, and ataxia of gait and stance. This cerebellar dysfunction is progressive and permanent. First onset of symptoms is normally between 30 and 40 years of age, though juvenile onset can occur. Death typically occurs within 10 to 30 years from onset.

SCA1 is typically inherited from the parents in an autosomal dominant regime; the children of a person with the disease have a 50% chance of inheriting it themselves, and new mutations can occur in some cases. It is caused by an expanded number of trinucleotide repeats in the polyglutamine tract of the ATXN1 gene, which encodes the ataxin 1 protein. This expansion results in a larger than normal number of repeats of the nucleotide sequence cytosine, adenine, guanine, or CAG, in the gene which, in turn, results in a larger than normal number of consecutive glutamine amino acid residues in the protein. This mutant protein causes degradation in certain types of neurons, like Purkinje neurons, which are common in the cerebellum, spinal cord, and related parts of the brain. While the mechanism is not fully understood, it is suspected that changes in the interactions between ataxin 1 and other proteins result in a toxic gain of function.

The mutation can be detected before or after the onset of symptoms by genetic testing. Currently, no cure for SCA1 is known, so treatment of the disease focuses primarily on management of symptoms to maintain quality of life, focusing on physical therapy to retrain and replace lost functions. Research to develop treatments is ongoing and in addition to conventional pharmaceutical treatment, SCA1 has been the subject of research into more advanced treatment options such as gene therapy and stem cell therapy. Worldwide, an expected 1 to 2 people in 100,000 have spinocerebellar ataxia type 1, however, the prevalence varies between populations and is often linked to the founders effect.

Ataxia as a symptom has been known since the mid 19th century and the heterogeneous group of diseases now known as spinocerebellar ataxias was the subject of extensive research in the latter part of that century. Advances in molecular genetics in the 20th century allowed distinct causes of these diseases to be identified. In the early 1990s the gene causing SCA1 was localized to the human leukocyte antigen complex on chromosome 6 and by 1993, ataxin 1 was identified as the causative gene. It was the first spinocerebellar ataxia-causing gene to be localized and identified.

== Signs and symptoms ==
Ataxia refers to a lack of coordinated muscle movements that include gait abnormality and is the cerebellar sign that typifies all spinocerebellar ataxia (SCA) types, though individuals with SCA1 also develop pyramidal and bulbar signs as the disease progresses. The average age of onset is between 30 and 40 years of age, though exceptions exist. From the first symptoms, duration is typically between one and three decades, where earlier onset correlates with faster progression.

Spinocerebellar ataxia 1, like other SCAs, often causes dysarthria, a motor disorder of speech often manifest as slurring of words; pathological nystagmus, a disorder in which eyes drift involuntarily affecting vision; and gait and balance issues. SCA1 is also commonly present with dysphagia, a swallowing disorder that can cause choking while eating and drinking; and hypermetric saccades, where the eye tends to move faster or further than intended as it tracks an object or moves from one focus to another. As the disease progresses, more severe neurologic symptoms can appear like dysmetria, where limb movements consistently overshoot the desired position; dysdiadochokinesia, where repeated body movements become uncoordinated; or hypotonia, where muscles atrophy. While new symptoms appear as SCA1 progresses, nystagmus may disappear as eye movements and saccades slow down. Fatality may ultimately be caused by loss of bulbar functions, but complications from symptoms, such as pneumonia from swallowing problems, or trauma from falls, can be fatal as well. The severity and exact phenotype of these symptoms may vary between types of SCA. SCA 1 dysarthria may vary in severity depending on the task and is often associated with more strained, strangled or harsh sounding vocalization than that of other disorders.

Because of the significant variance between cases of SCA1, typical signs and symptoms may appear alongside more subtle or rare symptoms. Maculopathy has been reported in rare cases, and may be linked effects from the mutation on the ATXN1 locus on genes in neighboring loci. Task specific dystonias have been reported in individual cases, often in the form of writer's cramps or cervical dystonia.

SCAs can also be detected before serious atrophy with electrophysiologic techniques, using electrodes on the scalp to detect changes in electric potential within the brain in response to sensations or movements. Individuals with SCA1 often exhibit abnormal brainstem auditory evoked potential, including prolonged latency and absent or poorly defined waveforms, with one study reporting 73.3% of test subjects exhibiting abnormalities. The same study also found abnormalities in visual evoked potential and median somatosensory evoked potential in some SCA1 persons. These results were similar to those exhibited in other SCAs and differences between the SCAs were not statistically significant, so electrophysiologic techniques cannot replace genetic testing for specific diagnoses of SCAs.

All SCAs cause atrophy in various neural tissues that are detectable using magnetic resonance imaging, computed tomography, or other imaging techniques. In SCA1 some degradation in the grey matter of the cerebellum and brain stem can sometimes be detected in presymptomatic individuals with the expansion in ATXN1. Typically, grey matter loss can be observed in cerebellar vermis in all lobules of the cerebellum and in the paramedian portions of both hemispheres. White matter loss can also be observed in the middle cerebellar peduncles. The volume loss can be correlated to severity and duration.

An estimated 77% of cases of progressive cerebellar disease are reported to have one or more mental health disorders, and 19% exhibit cognitive disorders. These estimates are consistently higher than the portion with mental health disorders in the general population, but still follow other general patterns, like correlations between depression frequency and sex or age. It is unclear if depression can be linked causally to cerebellar degeneration; one study reports data consistent with depression primarily being a response to the disability, not a symptom of it, while another reports evidence that depression may have a causal link; prevalence of depression varies differently between SCA types than does the rate of progression of disability.

== Genetics ==
A pedigree showing an autosomal dominant inheritance pattern like what is expected in families with SCA1. Regardless of gender or other traits, the probability of each offspring inheriting the affected gene is 50%.

Spinocerebellar ataxia type 1 is caused by a mutation in the ATXN1 gene. This mutation is passed down through an autosomal dominant inheritance pattern, meaning that the disease does not skip generations, at least one parent must have the disease for the children to inherit it, and that the odds of any given child inheriting SCA 1, regardless of gender or other phenotypes, is 50% if the affected parent is heterozygous. The ATXN1 gene on chromosome 6 encodes the ataxin 1 protein, which is used in signaling pathways and gene regulation, and is heavily expressed in Purkinje neurons. The coding region for Ataxin 1 (6p22.3) contains a polyglutamine tract of variable length. SCA1 is present in individuals where the region on at least one copy of chromosome 6 contains 39 or more continuous repeats of glutamine in which more repeats are correlated to earlier onset and faster progression. Histidine interruptions in the polygluatamine tract can mitigate or prevent SCA1.

SCA1 is known to exhibit genetic anticipation, where one generation with the disease may exhibit earlier onset and faster progression than the previous generation. This is typically caused by expansions in the polyglutamine tract between generations and is more common in cases of patrilineal inheritance. This non-Mendelian inheritance is similar to that observed in Huntington's disease and is believed to be caused by differences in various mechanisms in gamete production between the sexes that result in increased mosaicism in the male germline. DNA with CAG repeats are prone to forming secondary structures, including hairpin loops and R-loops, which can result in mutations and mosaicism if DNA repair mechanisms fail. These secondary structures cause somatic mosaicism by lagging DNA polymerase in Okazaki fragments and by disrupting DNA mismatch repair, base excision repair, nucleotide excision repair and double strand break repair mechanisms. The mechanism for germline expansions is not well understood, but it is believed that only mismatch repair pathways effect germline instability and the MSH2 repair protein has been linked to expansions in male gametes in mice models.

== Pathophysiology ==
Normal ataxin 1 is intimately involved in a number of signaling pathways, in protein ubiquitination, RNA metabolism, in transcription regulation, protein transformation, and protein stabilization. Among other interactions, it forms a transcription complex with Retinoid-related Orphan nuclear-receptor transcription factor α (RORα) following interactions with an activator, Histone acetyltransferase KAT5, sometimes referred to as TIP60, and it is in the signaling mediated by metabotropic glutamate receptor 1 (mGluR1). Resonant Recognition Modeling of the ataxin 1 protein has shown possible binding sites for growth factor independent transcription repressor 1 (Gfi-1). The predictions of this computational model reveal an interaction that could play a role in SCA1 pathology, because the Gfi-1 protein is known to cause selective degradation of Purkinje cells. It is the extensive involvement of ataxin 1 in many different functions that make understanding the biochemical pathophysiology of its mutant form difficult to identify and understand.

The mechanism by which expanded CAG repeat regions in ataxin 1 cause neuronal degeneration is unclear. It was historically believed to be caused by aggregation and deposition of the affected protein similar to other polyglutamine expansion diseases, however rodent model studies have shown significantly later formation of nuclear inclusions of mutant proteins in cerebellum and spinal cord neurons than in cortical and hippocampal neurons, which typically show only mild degeneration in SCA1 persons, suggesting a more complicated mechanism. Ataxin-null mice are shown to exhibit reduced motor and spatial learning, suggesting ataxin 1 plays a role in synaptic plasticity and interactions between the motor neurons and the hippocampus. However mice lacking both copies of ataxin 1 do not develop progressive neurological symptoms or show signs of atrophy, suggesting that toxicity of the mutated protein, not loss of function, is the main mechanism for SCA1 pathology. A comparison of mRNA between ataxin null mice and mice with ataxin1^{154Q/+} shows that there are common changes in gene expression, including upregulation of genes known to be repressed by an ataxin 1/CIC complex. This suggest that, while not the primary mechanism, a loss of ataxin 1 function contributes to the pathogenesis of SCA1. While the ataxin 1/CIC complex losses some of its regulatory function with expanded ataxin 1, CIC knockout mice do not show degeneration, suggesting interactions between ataxin 1 and CIC mediate most of the toxic effects. Mutant ataxin-1 also known to alter the neural circuitry of the developing cerebellum, which may lead to later vulnerability of Purkinje cells and suggests the existence of non-cell autonomous toxicity.

The various interactions of ataxin 1 lead to many possible factors that can exasperate or moderate toxicity of its mutant form. Wild type ataxin 1 is quickly degraded in the cytoplasm, but can be stabilized by phosphorylation and 14-3-3 binding as needed by the cell. SCA1 positive mice haplodeficient in 14-3-3ε^{+/-} were shown not to exhibit cerebellar degeneration but still exhibited lethal bulbar degeneration, suggesting that cerebellar atrophy may be related to increased stability of the expanded ataxin 1 protein and that there may be different pathogenic mechanisms for different regions of the brain. The site of phosphorylation is the serine at the 776th residue in ataxin 1. Similar to those that lack 14-3-3 proteins, mice with this residue replaced with alanine do not exhibit cerebellar syndrome. Similarly, removal of the AXH domain from ataxin 1 prevents aberrant interactions with growth factor independent transcription repressor 1 that leads to GFI1 degradation in the proteasome. The expanded polyglutamine region results in increased affinity of the ataxin 1 AXH domain for certain transcription factors, and this effect is believed to play a significant role in ataxin 1 toxicity. Another protein shown to have significant interactions with ataxin 1 is the leucine-rich acidic nuclear protein or LANP. Its function is unknown, but it is predominately expressed in the same neurons as ataxin 1 and has been shown to localize in the nuclei of these neurons at the same substructures as ataxin 1. LANP only interacts with the polyglutamine region of ataxin 1, and its interactions are stronger as the number of glutamine residues increases, so the two proteins are likely vital to each other's functions in neurons and LANP may also facilitate pathology of mutant ataxin 1 proteins. Ataxin 1 like, also called Brother of Ataxin 1 or Boat, has significant interactions with ataxin-1 and many associated proteins, like N-CoR. Ataxin 1 like has reduced expression in transgenic mice models and has been shown to moderate cytotoxicity of ataxin-1.

Toxicity from the mutated protein causes degradation in neural tissues. This includes loss of dendritic arborization, or branching, early in disease progression and eventual atrophy of brain tissues in later stages. SCA1 causes moderate degradation of a variety of tissues, including both hemispheres of the cerebellum, the cerebellar vermis, the pons, and the brain stem. It also causes mild atrophy in cerebral cortical tissue. A recent study also found significant atrophy of the spinal cord and flattening of the posterior column and found a correlation between cord area, CAG repeats, and SARA scores in SCA1. Central nervous system tissues, unlike that of bone, muscle, or skin, lacks mechanisms for endogenously generating and differentiating new cells and for restoring long distance patterns and connections as they are lost, so as degeneration progresses the losses are permanent.

A little is known about glia-neuronal interaction in SCA1. The Bergman Glia (BG) cells are in a tight functional connection with Purkinje neurons. Under physiological conditions, BG mediates the uptake of synaptic glutamate via the excitatory amino acid transporter (EAAT1, also known as GLAST and encoded by Slc1A3 gene), preventing excitotoxicity. Recent studies have provided new insight into the multifunctional interaction between BG and Purkinje cells. Excessive release of the S100β protein by Bergman glial cells affects synaptic transmission in Purkinje neurons, disrupting short-term plasticity. Optogenetic stimulation of BG drastically affects the morphology of Purkinje neurons and changes the dynamics of synaptic transmission. These results are consistent with data obtained from a lentiviral model of SCA1, where the mutant ataxin gene ATXN1 [Q85] expressed exclusively in BG. Moreover, the genetic murine model of SCA1, in which mice ubiquously express mutant Ataxin 1 [Q154] in all cells, demonstrates similar changes, confirming the pivotal role of glial cells in SCA1.

== Diagnosis and evaluation ==
Most SCAs and other ataxic disorders are clinically heterogeneous, meaning clinical signs and symptoms are similar between diseases and distinguishing between diseases with a neurologic exam alone is difficult. In symptomatic persons, diagnosis of ataxia related disorders often requires a neurological exam, evaluation of neurological and family history, and molecular genetic testing. Absence of a family history does not exclude hereditary causes like spinocerebellar ataxia type 1 because family history may not have been collected or may be unavailable for certain individuals and new cases may originate from anticipation in an allele with a mutable number of repeats. To establish a diagnosis, molecular genetic testing is currently commercially available for 14 SCA types, including SCA1. In cases where SCAs are not present in family history or where family history is unavailable, testing for the 4 most common SCAs will return positive results for 50% of suspected SCA cases. Individuals who are at risk of inheriting SCA1 but are currently presymptomatic can also be screened with molecular genetic testing.

=== Genetic testing ===
Genetic testing is the only definitive way to differentiate between spinocerebellar ataxia types because of the similarity between clinical characteristics of these diseases and the large variance between cases. Genetic testing is available for many SCA types, including the relatively common types SCA1, 2, 3, 6, and 7; and the less common SCA8, 10, 12, 14, and 17. However, genetic testing is high in cost and has a low diagnostic yield, with positive diagnoses being found in only 24% of tests ordered by a subspecialist and 10% overall.

Genetic testing can be administered at various stages of disease progression. When genetic testing is administered after the onset of symptoms, the test is said to be diagnostic; in adults prior to onset of symptoms it is presymptomatic, and the test can be performed for prenatal or preimplantation diagnoses. The European Molecular Quality Genetics Network (EMQN) recommends criteria for each type, which must be met before testing can begin. The EQMN recommends that labs receive a written clinical evaluation of symptoms by a neurologist and a disclosure of family history, or lack of history, before initiating diagnostic genetic testing. Because no preventative or curative treatments are known for SCAs, genetic testing for at risk individuals is not recommended for all cases, and is typically issued on an individual basis. Presymptomatic, prenatal, and preimplantation testing are typically requested through a genetic counsellor and require existing family history and documentation of informed consent of the consultand. Spinocerebellar ataxia type 1 was one of the first late onset diseases for which presymptomatic testing was demonstrated effective and predictive; prior to the development of testing for SCA1, Huntington's disease was the only similar disease for which presymptomatic testing was available.

Molecular genetic testing of SCAs must be able to differentiate samples with the pathogenic allele from those without and be able to accurately measure the number of repeats in repeat expansion disorders. Capillary electrophoresis (CE) is one method that has met these criteria and is recommended by the EMQN. Another method that is common is polyacrylamide gel electrophoresis (PAGE). Both methods require amplification of all loci of interest for a given test. Amplification is done using polymerase chain reactions or PCR. The choice of primers can allow either for a single gene to be amplified or for many genes to amplified for use in a multiplex assay which can save time in cases where a panel of many tests may be required. PAGE and CE both use timed cycles of electricity to draw pieces of DNA through a porous polymer, separating analytes by a combination of ionic mobility, size and mass. CE is advantageous over PAGE in that molecular weight measurements like mass spectrometry can be used with analytes, whereas PAGE requires the use of Southern blot to allow comparison to a sequencing ladder. For repeat lengths within the range where interruptions are relevant, assays like CE and PAGE will not determine if the strain is pathogenic and additional testing will be required.

=== Clinical ===
No formal diagnostic criteria exist for most SCAs, and genetic testing is the only certain diagnostic method, but clinical examination of signs and symptoms may be vital to distinguishing SCAs from non-genetic ataxias, and from other types of genetic ataxias. Clinical examination can also help distinguish between SCA types to some extent, so genetic tests for certain types can be prioritized over others. Diagnosis of SCAs often begins with the detection of symptoms that suggest a cerebellar disorder, like progressive ataxia or dysarthria, or with recognition of similar symptoms to a case identified in the individuals family history, especially in first or second degree relatives. Many laboratory studies can be used to further narrow the potential cause of ataxia; imaging of brain and spinal cord and various electrophysiology exams may be useful for identifying disease phenotypes and blood and urine studies may rule out acquired causes.

When evaluating ataxic disorders and their treatments, there are numerous tests that a neurologist may perform. Tests may be evaluated individually or follow a scale for evaluating the ataxia. A cerebellar exam may include saying phrases with many consonants to detect scanning speech, detecting horizontal gaze nystagmus by following a finger with the eyes, performing rapid alternating movements like rotating a hand from palm to back repeatedly, testing the Holmes rebound phenomenon, and testing patellar reflex for hypotonia or hypertonia. Common scales include the International Cooperative Ataxia Rating Scale (ICARS) and Scale for the Assessment and Rating of Ataxic Disorders (SARA) for evaluating the severity of ataxia as a symptom. ICARS measures on a 100 scale, where 0 is normal function and 100 is the highest possible impairment, assigning different point values for different tests. The tests are divided into categories evaluating posture and gait, kinetic functions, speech, and oculomotor functions. While these categories create useful categorization to assess which areas need to be focused on in therapies, this redundancy results in a longer test time, which can skew results of tests performed at the end of a session; and can result in contradictory scores. SARA is a shorter exam, evaluated on a scale of 0 to 40, where again zero is normal function and 40 is highest possible impairment. It comprises eight tests: gait, stance, finger chase, finger-to-nose test, fast alternating hand movements, heel-shin slide, and three limb kinectic function tests.

=== Differential diagnosis ===
Differential diagnosis of SCAs by clinical methods is difficult because these diseases are clinically heterogenous and there is significant variance between the expression of individual cases. Using clinical information for differential diagnosis is used to prioritize genetic testing not as a stand-alone diagnosis. Many potential differentiating symptoms have been found, and methods of assessing many symptoms and their progression to guide genetic testing have been developed. Even if a specific type of spinocerebellar ataxia cannot be immediately determined clinical history, family history, clinical examination can help distinguish between other ataxias and can help reduce the number of genetic tests needed to identify a type of SCA. Examination of relatives of individuals thought to have sporadic ataxia can often reveal enough family history to identify a transmission mode.

There are some common trends that may be useful to discriminate SCAs. SCA1 tends to progress faster than SCA2, 3, and 6, with greater annual change in SARA scores and earlier loss of functions after onset. In the diagnostics of clinical ataxia, imaging may not be useful to distinguish SCA1 from other SCAs as there is significant variance between individual cases and significant overlap between diseases. Vestibulo-ocular reflex can be tested using a video recorded head impulse test or vHIT. In this test, SCA1 typically has normal reflex latency, and does not consistently show a deficit in VOR function, distinguishing it from SCA3 and Friedreich's ataxia. Certain patterns in ocular motor disorders, detectable with video-oculography, appear to typify certain SCA types. While SCA1 was not significantly correlated with a unique pattern, other possible SCAs can be linked and absence of a vertical nystagmus following horizontal head shaking reduces the likelihood of an SCA6 diagnosis, while the absence of a square wave pattern during fixation reduces the likelihood of SCA3.

One possible system for the differential diagnosis of SCA types is to record the progression of symptoms and use Bayesian probability to build a predictive model, or a Bayesian classifier, that compares the observed data to trends like those described above to find the likelihood of each diagnosis to be correct. One such Bayesian classifier was shown to accurately predict 78% of SCA cases out of a cohort with known types of SCA. The sensitivity and specificity for SCA1 within this model was 76.9% and 98.2% respectively. Regional variance in prevalence, symptoms and clinical assessment might still limit the use of this system on large scales, though the system may implemented by individual clinics using their own regional data.

== Management ==
There is currently no cure for Spinocerebellar ataxia type 1. However, some of its symptoms may be managed with physical, occupational or speech therapies, lifestyle and dietary changes, or with medications. Managing symptoms will not prevent the disease from progressing but can be important for maintaining quality of life. However, many disorders that cause ataxia and related symptoms exist, and that management strategies that work for some, such as vitamin E supplements for certain acquired ataxias, will not work for hereditary ataxias like SCA1 and can be dangerous to a person's health.

Small cohort studies have shown that individuals with cerebellar disorders recover coordination and have lower SARA scores regardless of stage or severity of their ataxia before therapy when they are regularly participating in physiotherapy or exergaming over individuals who are not. These studies suggest that multidomain physical therapy, more focused coordinative training, and exergaming routines all produced improvements in SARA scores equivalent to at least one year of normal progression, 2.2 points or more on average, over the course of several weeks. While these results are promising, larger scale studies may be necessary to validate these results. Overall, physical therapy for individuals with ataxia has modest evidence supporting its efficaciousness, but current practice uses custom treatments without a standard decision making procedure between clinics, which limits the ability to reproducibly assess the quality of routines in literature. Among the earliest developed neurorehabilitation practices is Frenkel exercises, which was developed by Heinrich Frenkel in the mid nineteenth century; these exercises were drawn from contemporary physical medicine and rehabilitation techniques, called medical gymnastics, and from everyday activities, like standing up from a chair, to find exercises which are closely related to the pathology of ataxia and rely on slow practice and on the individuals perseverance to relearn key motor skills, replacing lost proprioception with visual feedback. There are exercises for lower limbs, like extending the legs, and upper limbs, like placing pegs in boards, and depending on the severity of the ataxia can be performed laying down, sitting, or standing up. All exercises often start with simple movements and become progressively more difficult to emulate real world movements affected by the disorder.

Common recommendations for persons with dysphagia, or swallowing problems, include pureeing food, replacing difficult to eat foods in the diet, or changing posture during eating. When swallowing problems become severe enough that aspiration pneumonias are frequent or dietary changes fail to prevent weight loss, a feeding tube may be considered. Typically these are percutaneous endoscopic gastrostomy jejunal tubes (PEG-Js), however these do not necessarily lead to a decreased incidence of aspiration, as clogs may result in gastroesophageal reflux which can be aspirated. Direct PEG-Js seem to cause less frequent reflux and have lower incidence of aspiration pneumonia compared to the standard PEG-J procedure. Numerous strategies for treating dysphagia have been investigated including physical exercises like modified Valsalva maneuvers, pharmaceutical treatments focused on treating spasticity, and compensatory practices including adjusting posture and longer chewing. These strategies, like the treatment of many symptoms hereditary ataxias, have small scale evidence for their usefulness but are not yet established by large studies.

As with all hereditary diseases, concerns about the impact on family members, especially children, are often very important. Individuals diagnosed with SCA 1 may seek genetic counseling to aid in family planning, developing coping skills, and planning for the future. Persons with SCA 1 may consider in vitro fertilization with preimplantation testing to prevent passing the disease on to their children.

== Prognosis ==
Penetrance for SCA1 is 100% for most alleles, so almost all individuals who have at least one copy of the mutated gene will eventually develop symptoms. At least one case has been reported where penetrance may have been incomplete in a woman with 44 glutamine repeats with histidine interruptions whose father had exhibited symptoms, but herself had not shown symptoms at the age of 66. Individuals with a low number of repeats, around 39 to 55, typically live past reproductive age and can pass on the disease to their children, while high repeats may express juvenile onset and fatality.

== Epidemiology ==
The National Institute of Health reports that SCA1 has a prevalence of approximately 1 or 2 per 100,000 however a review of literature has shown that these estimates vary significantly from study to study and can be less than 1 per 100,000 or as high as 6 per 100,000. Among all types of SCA, SCA1 is among the most common and the portion accounted for by SCA1 varies between geographic regions, with percentages as high as 40% of all SCA diagnoses in populations in Russia and South Africa being SCA1. In the United States SCA1 accounts for 6% of SCA diagnoses. Overall, SCA1 accounts for 6-27% of all cases dominant ataxias. Because of its late onset, often appearing after reproductive age, SCA1 exerts low selection intensity, ranking about 0.19 on the Crow's index, but intensity may vary with time within a population or family, as anticipation increases the number of CAG repeats. One implication of this is that SCA1 is unlikely to disappear from a population by natural selection alone.

Prevalence of each type of SCA varies with geographic region and ethnicity, possibly because of founder effects and historic migration patterns. High prevalence regions include central Poland, where 68% of autosomal dominant cerebellar disorders are SCA1; communities in Tamil Nadu, where up to 7.2% of the population has SCA1 in some small villages; the Tohoku region on the northern portion of Honshu Island, with 24.8% of cases being SCA1; and among Yakut populations in eastern Siberia, with a prevalence 46 per 100,000 in rural populations.

== History ==
Ataxia as a symptom was first described by French neurologist Duchenne de Boulogne in a subject with tabes dorsalis. By the late 19th and early 20th centuries, extensive research into the characterization, cause, and diagnostics of hereditary cerebellar ataxias was underway with the work of several prominent neurologists, including Jean-Martin Charcot, Pierre Marie, Nikolaus Friedreich, Adolph Strümpell, and others. Marie described a number of cases of hereditary, adult onset disease he thought to be clinically distinct from Friedreich's ataxia, spastic paraplegia, and other known types of ataxia, calling the syndrome hereditary cerebellar ataxia, though it became known Marie's ataxia.

While the hereditary patterns were clearly distinct, there was on-going debate well into the 1940s over whether Marie's ataxia was really distinct from Freidreich's ataxia and Strümpell's paraplegia and if these category's themselves represented a single disease or many. This was because of the heterogenous nature of hereditary ataxias, the similarity of symptoms, and the lack of understood biochemical mechanisms. Further frustration with the ambiguity of terms introduced by Marie and Friedreich resulted in the creation of other systems to classify ataxias. Gordon Morgan Holmes and Godwin Greenfield each developed systems of categorizing ataxias, giving rise to categories called olivopontocerebellar atrophy and spinocerebellar degradation, though little consensus between the systems was achieved, and many terms are used interchangeably.

In the depression era United States, the Schut family in Minnesota was one family known to carry a hereditary ataxia. Several members of the family actively participated in research and the family consented to post mortem examinations of the brains of several deceased relatives. The disease in the Schut family was found to have an autosomal dominant inheritance pattern, and afflicted the spinocerebellar tract. In 1945, John Schut received free medical school education for his service with the United States Army during the second world war and began his own efforts researching hereditary ataxia. Schut developed ataxia like many of his relatives. In 1957, when Schut's ataxia progressed to a point where he was unable to continue work in regular medical practice, he founded the National Ataxia Foundation with lab space donated by Glenwood Hills Hospital in Minneapolis.

John Schut's nephew, Lawerence Schut, also became an ataxia researcher and contributed to localizing a spinocerebellar ataxia gene to the human leukocyte antigen complex in chromosome 6. The success in linking one of these class of diseases to a locus showed that the classification systems in use were unable to distinguish between diseases with many different causes. Many ataxic disorders which were historically identified as Marie's ataxia, olivopontocerebellar atrophy or other names were now reclassified as types of spinocerebellar ataxia, each type numbered in order as a new locus was found. In 1993, the gene and a mutation causing spinocerebellar ataxia type 1 was identified. It was the first genetic defect found known to cause an ataxic disorder.

== Research directions ==
Treatment and mitigation of neurodegenerative disorders is of particular interest to researchers, and several potential options for SCA1 are under investigation. As the pathology of SCA1 is complex, there are several possible approaches to treatment, which include clearance of expanded ataxin 1 proteins, reducing the toxicity of expanded ataxin 1 proteins, suppressing production of ataxin 1, multiple gene therapies, and replacing lost brain cells. Because many SCAs, including SCA1, are polyglutamine diseases and operate by similar mechanisms to Huntington's disease many promising treatments for Huntington's disease are being investigated for SCAs as well.

=== Gene downregulation and silencing ===
Because spinocerebellar ataxias are often linked to a mutation on a single gene, modifying how the gene is expressed can modify the phenotype. There are several approaches to modifying the expression of mutant proteins, including techniques that completely stop expression, known as gene silencing. In SCA1, pathogenesis requires constant expression of the mutant ATXN1 gene, and silencing has been shown to halt further progression of the disease, clear nuclear inclusions and aggregates and lead to partial recovery of motor functions in rodent models with conditional expression of the gene. The conditional expression of ATXN1 in mice models differs from how the gene would be silenced therapeutically but the results indicate that therapeutic methods of gene silencing may be viable for treatment and management of SCA1. The process that turns coded information in DNA into proteins requires two steps: transcription, in which DNA is used to generate a complementary RNA strand by RNA polymerase, and translation, in which RNA is used to produce a protein by ribosomes. Disrupting either step can slow or prevent the expression of a mutant gene.

Ataxin 1 is involved in a number of signaling pathways and its expression is controlled by signaling pathways. The MAPK/ERK pathway has been shown to activate ataxin 1 expression, and MSK1 also phosphorylates ataxin 1, controlling its localization and degradation. Inhibitors of key proteins in this pathway may be used in combination therapy to potentially decrease expression and lower steady state concentrations of ataxin 1.

One technique for disrupting translation, antisense oligonucleotide therapy, which uses single strands of RNA complementary to the target to prevent the target from binding to a ribosome and trigger the degradation of the target, has already begun clinical trials in other neurodegenerative disorders with many different delivery mechanisms. A similar technique is RNA interference or RNAi. Instead of complementary 'antisense' strands of RNA, RNAi uses very small double stranded segments of RNA called small interfering RNA which triggers degradation of the target before it can be translated. Studies using RNAi agents delivered by adeno associated viruses (AAV) has been shown to halt progression of disease and lead to some recovery of function with treatment applied to only the deep cerebellar nuclei in mice and rhesus macaques. Both of these techniques are difficult to apply to polyglutamine diseases because targeting the polyglutamine tract may cause normal genes to be downregulated as well. SCA1 has also shown to be difficult to target reliably with single-nucleotide polymorphisms limiting the number of ways RNAi and antisense therapy techniques can be designed to treat SCA1.

=== Reducing toxicity and increasing cell survival ===
Because of the numerous interactions ataxin-1 has with other proteins, techniques for reducing toxicity of the mutant ataxin-1 protein often change the expression of related proteins. For example, ataxin-1-like has many common domains with ataxin-1 and overexpression of ataxin-1-like compete with ataxin-1 and prevent its integration into other complexes, reducing toxicity. This effect was replicated in mice models using AAVs, and shown to be about as effective as RNAi techniques at slowing the progression of symptoms. Similarly, the drug baclofen, which is used to help reduce spasticity in persons with multiple sclerosis and related diseases, operates as an agonist of γ-aminobutyric acid type B receptors (GABA_{B}R). This pathway crosstalks with the mGluR1 pathway, which interacts with the ataxin 1 protein and proteins responsible for localization and degradation of ataxin 1, suggesting that baclofen may be a viable treatment for SCA 1 treatment.

Molecular chaperones are introduced proteins that may have interactions with the mutant protein that reduce toxicity by various mechanisms. Studies in both mice models and Drosophila models have shown that heat shock proteins 40 and 70 may reduce toxicity of expanded ataxin 1 proteins and slow progression of SCA1.

While there is currently no known method for exclusively promoting polyglutamine contractions in vivo, techniques using programmable nucleases have shown some promise in causing these changes in vitro. Programmable nucleases are proteins that can break DNA strands near sequences that can be specified by scientists before use. This includes CRISPR/Cas9, which uses a protein found in bacteria and guide strand of RNA, and zinc finger nucleases, which use engineered proteins with special recurring DNA binding domains to guide an attached nuclease. A study reports that both CRISPR and Zinc fingers nucleases that rely on double strand breaks trigger contractions and expansions with nearly equal frequency, while CRISPR using a mutant variation of Cas9, Cas9 D10A or Cas9 nickase, which causes only single strand breaks, produced mainly contractions.

In mice, mitochondrial impairments contribute to SCA1 progression. Prominent alterations in Purkinje cell mitochondrial proteins coincide with the symptomatic phase of the disease. Purkinje cells in SCA1 mice also undergo age-dependent alterations in mitochondrial morphology. In addition, Purkinje cells of SCA1 mice have impaired electron transport complexes and decreased ATPase activity. The SCA1 mice experience increased oxidative stress and increased oxidative DNA damage. The mitochondrial targeted antioxidant MitoQ was found to slow down the appearance of SCA1-linked neuropathologies such as lack of motor coordination. MitoQ also prevented oxidative stress induced DNA damage and Purkinje cell loss.

=== Cell replacement therapies ===
One treatment option being investigated is stem cell therapy, which attempts to replace dead tissue by transplanting stem cells into affected region and either stimulating them to differentiate into the desired cell types or allowing them to stimulate endogenous regenerative mechanisms. These techniques are of interest to researchers as a possible treatment for neurodegenerative diseases, but currently are of limited success in animal models, and in in-vitro cell culture studies. The ability for grafted cells to integrate into the desired tissue and adjust for the unique pathologies of different neurodegenerative disorders can be a severe limitation on the development of stem cell based treatments. Further, the tissues in the brain often rely on intricate and complicated arrangements of neurons; regions of the brain that do not require precision in these patterns to function, like the striatum affected by Parkinson's disease which uses paracrine signaling, tend to have better results in stem cell therapies than systems that require precision, like the cerebellum and pons. Stem cell therapies can be especially difficult in replacing Purkinje neuron loss as unaffected granule cells can prevent axons reaching the deep cerebellar nuclei with which Purkinje cells interface. Despite these difficulties, grafted neural precursor cells have been shown to be viable and to successfully migrate into desired location in SCA1 transgenic mice models and mesenchymal stem cells have been shown to mitigate loss of dendritic arborization SCA1 mice. Positive results have been found in mice models using both stem cells from fetal neuroectoderm and adult stem cells from the lateral ventricles and the dentate gyrus. Using harvested stem cells in stem cell therapies require immunosuppression to prevent the host from rejecting the transplants; creating induced pluripotent stem cells from the host's own cells would mitigate this risk and has had some testing in other neurodegenerative diseases.
