= Nuclear protein in testis gene =

Protein-coding gene found in humans

NUTM1

Identifiers
- Aliases: NUTM1, C15orf55, FAM22H, NUT, NUT midline carcinoma family member 1, Nuclear protein in testis gene
- External IDs: OMIM: 608963; MGI: 2661384; GeneCards: NUTM1

Gene location (Human)
Chr.	Chromosome 15 (human)
Band	15q14	Start	34,343,315 bp
Band	15q14	End	34,357,737 bp

Gene location (Mouse)
Chr.	Chromosome 2 (mouse)
Band	2|2 E3	Start	112,078,293 bp
Band	2|2 E3	End	112,089,636 bp
RNA expression pattern
Bgee	Human / Mouse (ortholog); Top expressed in: right testis; left testis; testicle; gonad; external globus pallidus; subthalamic nucleus; inferior ganglion of vagus nerve; duodenum; mucosa of transverse colon; human musculoskeletal system / Top expressed in: spermatid; seminiferous tubule; morula; zygote; secondary oocyte; spermatocyte; Gonadal ridge; primary oocyte; blastocyst; hypothalamus; More reference expression data
BioGPS	n/a
Orthologs
Databases	NCBI: entry; OMA: entry
Species	Human	Mouse
Entrez	256646	213765
Ensembl	ENSG00000184507	ENSMUSG00000041358
UniProt	Q86Y26	Q8BHP2
RefSeq (mRNA)	NM_001284292; NM_001284293; NM_175741	NM_172521
RefSeq (protein)	NP_001271221; NP_001271222; NP_786883	NP_766109
Location (UCSC)	Chr 15: 34.34 – 34.36 Mb	Chr 2: 112.08 – 112.09 Mb
PubMed search
- Wikidata
View/Edit Human	View/Edit Mouse

The nuclear protein in testis gene (i.e. NUTM1 gene) encodes (i.e. directs the synthesis of) a 1,132-amino acid protein termed NUT that is expressed almost exclusively in the testes, ovaries, and ciliary ganglion (i.e. a parasympathetic ganglion of nerve cells located just behind the eye). NUT protein facilitates the acetylation of chromatin (i.e. DNA-protein bundles) by histone acetyltransferase EP300 in testicular spermatids (cells that mature into sperms). This acetylation is a form of chromatin remodeling which compacts spermatid chromatin, a critical step required for the normal conduct of spermatogenesis, i.e. the maturation of spermatids into sperm. Male mice that lacked the mouse Nutm1 gene using a gene knockout method had abnormally small testes, lacked sperm in their cauda epididymis (i.e. tail of the epididymis which contains sperm in fertile male mice), and were completely sterile. These findings indicate that Nutm1 gene is essential for the development of normal fertility in male mice and suggest that the NUTM1 gene may play a similar role in men.

The NUTM1 gene is located in band 14 on the long (or "q") arm of chromosome 15. In the early 1990s, this gene was implicated in the development of certain epithelial cell cancers that: a) occurred in the midline structures of young people, b) were rapidly fatal, and c) consisted of poorly differentiated (i.e. not resembling any particular cell type), immature-appearing cells containing a BRD4-NUTM1 fusion gene. BRD4 is the bromodomain-containing protein 4 gene. A fusion gene is an abnormal gene consisting of parts from two different genes that form as a result of a large scale gene mutation such as a chromosomal translocation, interstitial deletion, or inversion. The BRD4-NUTM1 fusion gene is a translocation that encodes a fusion protein that has merged most of the protein coding region of the NUTM1 gene with a large part of the BRD4 gene located in band 13 on the short (i.e. "q") arm of chromosome 19. This translocation is notated as t(15;19)(q13, p13.1).

BRD4 protein recognizes acetylated lysine residues on proteins and by doing so participates in the regulation of DNA replication, DNA transcription, and thereby key cellular processes involved in the development of neoplasms (i.e. malignant or benign tissue growths). The product of the BRD4-NUTM1 fusion gene, BRD4-NUT protein, stimulates the expression of at least 4 relevant genes, MYC, TP63, SOX2, and MYB in cultured cells. All four of these genes are oncogenes, i.e., genes that when overexpressed and/or overly active promote the development of certain types of cancers. Overexpression of the MYC and SOX2 genes can also act to maintain cells in an undifferentiated stem cell-like state similar to the cells in the neoplasms driven by the BRD4-NUTM1 fusion gene. It is generally accepted that the BRD4-NUT protein promotes these neoplasms by maintaining their neoplastic cells in a perpetually undifferentiated, proliferative state. Further studies are needed to confirm and expand these views and to determine if any of the overexpressed gene products of the BRD4-NUT protein contribute to the development and/or progression, or can serve as targets for the treatment, of the neoplasms associated with the BRD4-NUTM1 fusion gene. These questions also apply to a wide range of neoplasms that have more recently been associated with the NUTM1 gene fused to other genes.

== Neoplasms associated with NUTM1 fusion genes ==
=== NUT carcinoma ===
NUT carcinoma is a rare, highly aggressive malignancy. Initially, it was regarded as occurring in the midline areas of the upper respiratory tract, upper digestive tract, and mediastinum (i.e. central compartment of the thoracic cavity) of young adults and to lesser extents children and infants. It was therefore termed NUT midline granuloma. However, subsequent studies defined these carcinomas based on the presence of a NUT fusion gene in their malignant cells. As so defined, this malignancy occurs in individuals of all ages and, while most commonly developing in the cited respiratory, gastrointestinal, and mediastinal areas, occasionally develops in the salivary glands, pancreas, urinary bladder, retroperitoneum (i.e. space behind the peritoneum of the abdominal cavity), endometrium, kidneys, ovaries, and other organs. Consequently, the name of this disorder was changed form NUT midline carcinoma to NUT carcinoma by the World Health Organization, 2015. NUT carcinomas are characterized histologically as tumors containing primitive epithelioid cells (i.e. derived from activated macrophages and resembling epithelial cells) admixed with foci of keratinization (i.e. tissue areas that are rich in keratin fibers); NUT carcinomas are considered variants of squamous cell carcinomas. Studies have found that ~66 to 80% of NUT carcinomas harbor a BRD4-NUTM1 fusion gene while the remaining NUT carcinomas, sometimes termed NUT variant carcinomas, involve the BRD3-NUTM1 (~10 to 25% of cases) or, rarely, the NSD3-NUTM1, ZNF532-NUTM1,, or ZNF592-NUTM1 fusion gene. It is thought that the latter fusions genes promote NUT carcinomas in manners at least somewhat similar to the BRD4-NUTM1 fusion gene.

=== Acute lymphoblastic leukemia ===
Acute lymphoblastic leukemia (ALL) is a blood cancer of malignant B lymphocytes (termed B-cell ALL) or T lymphocytes (termed T-cell ALL) that typically occurs in infants and young children. In a three population-representative cohort study, NUTM1 gene rearrangements (i.e. fusion genes) occurred in 0.28 to 0.86% of pediatric patients with B-cell ALL. Among a total of 71 NUTM1-rearranged cases, 10 fusion partners of NUTM1 were identified: ACIN1-NUTM1 (24 cases), BRD9-NUTM1 (10 cases), CUX1-NUTM1 (15 cases), ZNF618-NUTM1 (9 cases; ZNF618 is the zinc finger protein 618 gene) fusion genes, and (in 1 to 4 cases each) AFF1-NUTM1, C17orf78-NUTM1 (C17orf78 is also termed ATAD5), CHD4-NUTM1, RUNX1-NUTM1, IKZF1-NUTM1, and SLC12A6-NUTM1 fusion genes. Individuals with these NUTM1 fusion gene-associated leukemias had appreciably better prognoses than those who had NUTM1 fusion gene negative B-cell acute lymphoblastic leukemias. It is thought that the cited fusion genes contribute to the development and/or progression of these NUTM1 fusion gene-associated ALL cases but the molecular mechanism(s) for this is unknown. Some HOXA genes, particularly HOXA9, are upregulated in these NUTM1 fusion gene-associated ALL cases as well as in cases of NUTM1 fusion gene-negative ALL. Further studies are required to determine if the overexpression of one or more HOXA genes contributes to NUTM1 fusion gene-associated B-cell ALL.

=== Poroma and porocarcinoma ===
Poroma is a benign, relatively common skin tumor that has the cellular features similar to those of a sweat gland duct. This tumor typically occurs as a solitary stalkless nodule on the soles and palms but may occur in any area where there are sweat glands. Porocarcinoma (also termed eccrine porocarcinoma and malignant eccrine poroma) is an extremely rare malignant counterpart of poromas. It may arise from a longstanding poroma but more commonly appears to develop independently of any precursor poroma. Porocarcinoma tumors predominantly afflict elderly individuals. A study of 104 poroma tumors detected the YAP1-NUTM1 and WWTR1-NUTM1 fusion genes in 21 cases and 1 case, respectively, while the same study of 11 porocarcinoma tumors detected the YAP1-NUTM1 fusion gene in 6 cases. Expression of the NUTM1 (fusion) protein was observed in 25 poroma and 6 porocarcinoma cases but not in a wide range of other skin tumor types. Studies on cultured immortalized human dermal keratinocyte (i.e. HDK) and mouse embryonic fibroblast NIH-3T3 cell lines found that the YAP1-NUTM1 and WWTR1-NUTM1 fusion genes stimulated the anchorage-independent growth of NIH-3T3 cells and activated a transcriptional enhancer factor family member (i.e. TEAD family) reporter gene. The TEAD family in mammals includes four members, TEAD1, TEAD2, TEAD3, and TEAD4 that are transcription factors, i.e. proteins that regulate the expression of various genes. TEAD family proteins have been found to promote the development, progression, and/or metastasis of various cancer types and, based on the studies just cited, are thought to do so in poromas and porocarcinomas. However, further studies are needed to confirm this association and determine if TEAD family transcription factors may be useful targets for treating the porocarcinomas.

=== Sarcomas ===
In addition to the NUTM1 fusion genes in the above cited carcinomas, recent studies have found NUTM1 fusion genes in malignancies with undifferentiated spindle cell, round cell, and epithelioid cell-like features which are regarded as sarcomas. Sarcomas with NUTM1 fusion genes typically a) occur in some sites were sarcomas otherwise rarely develop and b) consist of tumor cells that express a NUTM1 gene fused to one of the MADS-box gene family genes (i.e. a MXD4, MGA, or MXD1 gne), or, alternatively, a BRD4, ZNF532, or CIC gene. A recent review listed the follow NUTM1 fusion gene-associated sarcomas:

- Colorectal sarcomas: Six cases, all with a MXD4-NUTM1 fusion gene.
- Lung sarcomas: Four cases, one each with a BRD4-NUTM1, MDX4-NUTM1, CIC-NUTM1, or MGA-NUTM1 fusion gene.
- Kidney sarcomas: Three cases, two with a BRD4-NUTM1 and one with a CIC-NUTM1 fusion gene.
- Sarcomas of the extremities: Two cases of foot sarcomas, one with a MGA-NUTM1 and one with a X-NUTM1 (i.e. X indicates the fusion partner is not identified) fusion gene; two cases of thigh sarcomas, one with a BRD4-NUTM1 and the other with a MGA-NUTM1 fusion gene; and one case of an arm sarcoma with a BCORL1-NUTM1 fusion gene (BCORL1 is the BCL6 corepressor like 1 gene).
- Bone sarcomas: One case of mandible sarcoma with a ZNF532-NUTM1 fusion gene and one case each of temporal bone and occipital bone sarcomas (both of which were also in nearby brain tissues) with a CIC-NUTM1 fusion gene.
- Other sites: One case each of: stomach sarcoma with a MXD1-NUTM1 fusion gene; brain parietal cortex sarcoma with a BRD4-NUTM1 fusion gene; brain dura sarcoma with a MGA-NUTM1 fusion gene; sarcoma of the scalp with a CIC-NUTM1 fusion gene; paravertebral sarcoma with a CIC-NUTM1 gene; pleural sarcoma with the MGA-NUTM1 fusion gene; epidural sarcoma with CIC-NUTM1 gene; brain lateral ventricle sarcoma with the CIC-NUTM1 fusion gene; brain parietal cortex sarcoma with a BRD4-NUTM1 fusion gene; and ovary with a MXD4-NUTM1 fusion gene.

In general, these NUTM1 fusion gene-associated sarcomas have very poor prognoses and require further study to determine of role of these fusion genes in the development and progression of their corresponding sarcomas.
