= Vestigial-like family member 3 =

Protein-coding gene in the species Homo sapiens

VGLL3

Identifiers
- Aliases: VGLL3, VGL-3, VGL3, Vestigial-like family member 3, vestigial like family member 3
- External IDs: OMIM: 609980; MGI: 1920819; GeneCards: VGLL3

Gene location (Human)
Chr.	Chromosome 3 (human)
Band	3p12.1	Start	86,876,388 bp
Band	3p12.1	End	86,991,149 bp

Gene location (Mouse)
Chr.	Chromosome 16 (mouse)
Band	16|16 C1.3	Start	65,612,143 bp
Band	16|16 C1.3	End	65,663,254 bp
RNA expression pattern
Bgee	Human / Mouse (ortholog); Top expressed in: lower lobe of lung; saphenous vein; placenta; parietal pleura; superficial temporal artery; Achilles tendon; pericardium; germinal epithelium; stromal cell of endometrium; visceral pleura / Top expressed in: sciatic nerve; gastrula; calvaria; umbilical cord; decidua; stroma of bone marrow; skin of external ear; ascending aorta; skin of abdomen; transitional epithelium of urinary bladder; More reference expression data
BioGPS	n/a
Gene ontology
Molecular function	transcription factor activity, RNA polymerase II distal enhancer sequence-specific binding; DNA-binding transcription factor activity, RNA polymerase II-specific
Cellular component	nucleus
Biological process	regulation of transcription, DNA-templated; transcription, DNA-templated; regulation of transcription by RNA polymerase II
Sources:Amigo / QuickGO
Orthologs
Databases	NCBI: entry; OMA: entry
Species	Human	Mouse
Entrez	389136	73569
Ensembl	ENSG00000206538	ENSMUSG00000091243
UniProt	A8MV65	P85442
RefSeq (mRNA)	NM_016206; NM_001320493; NM_001320494	NM_028572; NM_001368760; NM_001368761
RefSeq (protein)	NP_001307422; NP_001307423; NP_057290	NP_082848; NP_001355689; NP_001355690
Location (UCSC)	Chr 3: 86.88 – 86.99 Mb	Chr 16: 65.61 – 65.66 Mb
PubMed search
- Wikidata
View/Edit Human	View/Edit Mouse

Vestigial-like family member 3 is a protein that in humans is encoded by the VGLL3 gene.

This protein is one of four mammalian homologs (VGLL1-4) of the vestigial gene found in the fruit fly Drosophila. VGLL3 functions as a transcription coregulator by binding to TEA domain (TEAD) transcription factors (TEAD1, TEAD2, TEAD3, TEAD4 ) through its TDU motif. VGLL3 has been implicated in various biological processes including myogenesis (formation of muscle tissue), cell proliferation, and cancer progression. VGLL3 can also promote epithelial-to-mesenchymal transition (EMT) and cell motility in certain cancer types, suggesting it may play a role in tumor development and metastasis.

== See also ==
- Vestigial like family member 4
