= Tead =

Tead or TEAD may mean:

== People ==
- Ordway Tead (1891–1973), American professor
- Phillips Tead (1893–1974), American actor

== Other ==
- Tooele Army Depot (TEAD), a United States Army post in Tooele County, Utah
- TEAD1. TEAD2, TEAD3, TEAD4 (transcription factors), proteins involved in handling DNA
