= DUX4 =

Protein found in humans

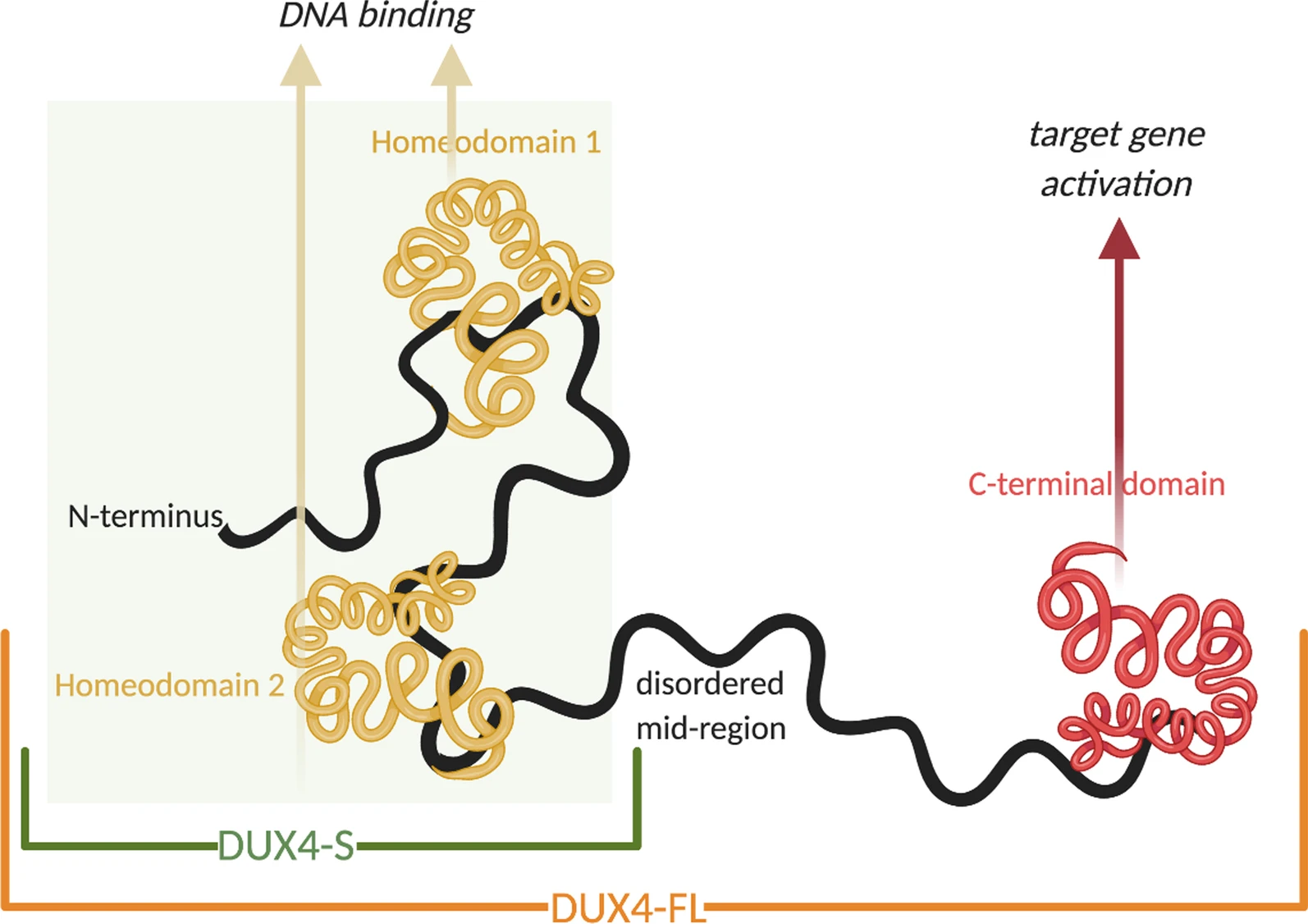

Identifiers
- Aliases: DUX4, DUX4L, double homeobox 4
- External IDs: OMIM: 606009; GeneCards: DUX4

Gene location (Human)
Chr.	Chromosome 4 (human)
Band	4q35.2	Start	190,173,774 bp
Band	4q35.2	End	190,185,942 bp
RNA expression pattern
Bgee	Human / Mouse (ortholog); Top expressed in: gonad; monocyte; sural nerve; left testis; muscle of thigh; right testis; primary visual cortex; smooth muscle tissue; duodenum; apex of heart / n/a; More reference expression data
BioGPS	n/a
Gene ontology
Molecular function	DNA binding; transcription cis-regulatory region binding; protein binding; RNA polymerase II cis-regulatory region sequence-specific DNA binding; DNA-binding transcription activator activity, RNA polymerase II-specific; sequence-specific double-stranded DNA binding
Cellular component	nuclear membrane; nucleus; nucleoplasm; nucleolus; cytosol; Golgi apparatus
Biological process	negative regulation of G0 to G1 transition; regulation of transcription, DNA-templated; transcription, DNA-templated; negative regulation of cell population proliferation; positive regulation of transcription by RNA polymerase II; apoptotic process; transcription by RNA polymerase II; multicellular organism development
Sources:Amigo / QuickGO
Orthologs
Databases	NCBI: entry; OMA: entry
Species	Human	Mouse
Entrez	100288687	n/a
Ensembl	ENSG00000260596; ENSG00000283949	n/a
UniProt	Q9UBX2	n/a
RefSeq (mRNA)	NM_001205218; NM_001278056; NM_001293798; NM_001306068; NM_001363820	n/a
RefSeq (protein)	NP_001280727; NP_001292997; NP_001350749	n/a
Location (UCSC)	Chr 4: 190.17 – 190.19 Mb	n/a
PubMed search		n/a
- Wikidata
View/Edit Human

Double homeobox, 4 also known as DUX4 is a protein which in humans is encoded by the DUX4 gene. Its misexpression is the cause of facioscapulohumeral muscular dystrophy (FSHD).

== Gene ==
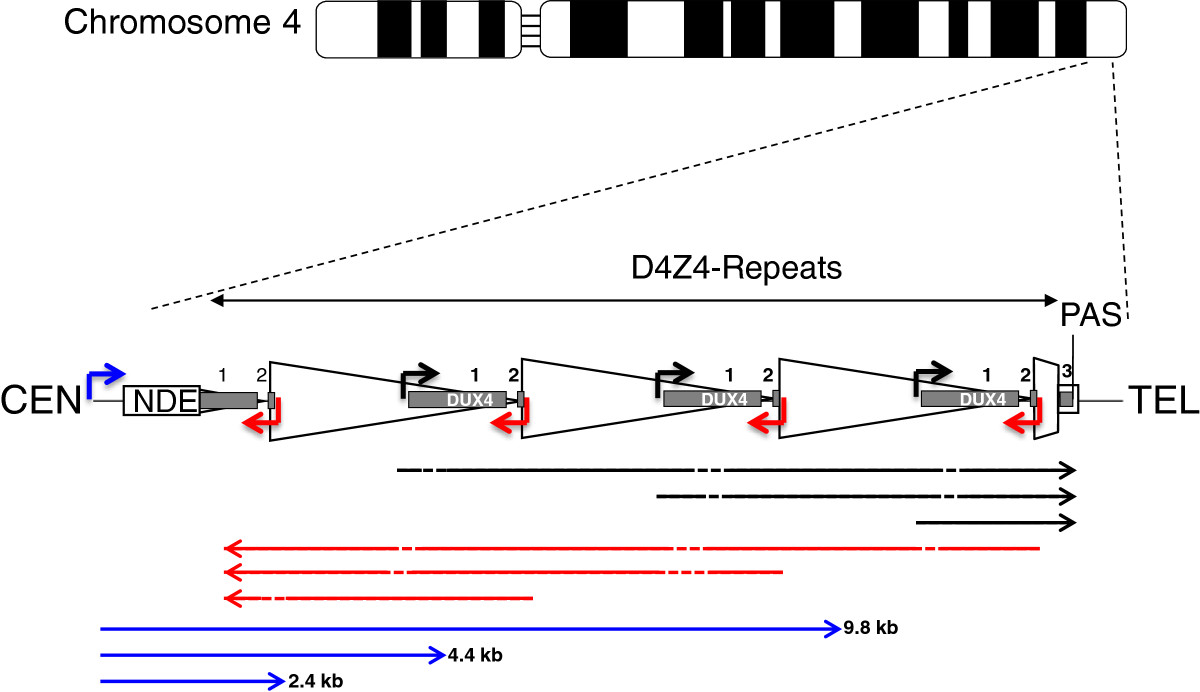
D4Z4 array with three D4Z4 repeats and the 4qA allele: CEN / centromeric end / TEL / telomeric end; NDE box / non-deleted element / PAS / polyadenylation site; triangle / D4Z4 repeat / trapezoid / partial D4Z4 repeat; white box / pLAM / gray boxes / DUX4 exons 1, 2, 3; arrows: corner / promoters / straight / RNA transcripts; black / sense / red / antisense; blue / DBE-T / dashes / dicing sites

This gene is located within a D4Z4 macrosatellite repeat array in the subtelomeric region of chromosome 4q35. The D4Z4 repeat array contains 11-150 D4Z4 repeats in the general population; a highly homologous D4Z4 repeat array has been identified on chromosome 10. The gene consists of three exons. Exons 1 and 2 are present in each D4Z4 repeat. Only one copy of exon 3 is present, telomeric to the D4Z4 repeat array. The open reading frame (ORF) is entirely contained within exon 1 and contains two homeoboxes. Exons 2 and 3 encode for the three prime untranslated region (3′-UTR). In certain haplotypes, exon 3 contains a polyadenylation signal. There was no evidence for transcription from the standard cDNA libraries however RT-PCR and in-vitro expression experiments indicate that the ORF is transcribed.

The repeat-array and ORF are conserved in other mammals.

== Structure ==
DUX4 protein is 424 amino acids long. Two homeodomains are situated at the N-terminus. A transcription-activating domain (TAD) and p300-binding domain are situated at the C-terminus. The TAD encompasses a potential nine amino acid TAD (9aaTAD).

The two homeodomains and TAD have well-defined tertiary structures. The region between the second homeodomain and TAD is predicted to be disordered.

DUX4 transcripts can be spliced to produce either DUX4-S (short) or DUX4-FL (full length) mRNAs. DUX4-FL mRNA encodes for the entire DUX4 protein. DUX4-S mRNA encodes for a partial DUX4 protein, which lacks the transcription-activating domain.

== Function ==
The DUX4 protein is a transcriptional activator of many genes, one example being paired-like homeodomain transcription factor 1 (PITX1). It likely stimulates zygotic genome activation.

The two homeodomains allow DUX4 protein to bind to DNA. The C-terminal domain is involved in target gene activation.

DUX is normally expressed in the testes, thymus, and cleavage-stage embryos.

== Clinical significance ==
Inappropriate expression of DUX4 in muscle cells is the cause of facioscapulohumeral muscular dystrophy (FSHD).

Overexpression of DUX4 due to translocations can cause B-cell leukemia. A translocation that merges DUX4 with CIC can cause an aggressive type of sarcoma.

In common biomedical model organisms, rhesus macaques and crab-eating macaques, the D4Z4 array syntenic to the human Chr4 array is different from its human counterpart. In macaques, all copies are towards the centromeric end, with the most centromeric copy potentially being the one that expresses. In macaques, in between DUX4 copies, there is a NUMT sequence. The NUMT sequence changed the methylation landscape, making this hypermethylated region fragmental.

=== Development of drugs ===
The "antisense oligonucleotide conjugate" delpacibart braxlosiran (aka Del-brax) aimed at suppressing expression of DUX4 was under development by Avidity Biosciences, which was continued by Novartis after their acquisition of Avidity in 2025.

== See also ==
- Homeobox
- PITX1
