= Capicua (protein) =

Protein found in humans

CIC

Identifiers
- Aliases: CIC, capicua transcriptional repressor, MRD45, CIC gene
- External IDs: OMIM: 612082; MGI: 1918972; GeneCards: CIC
Available structures
PDB	Ortholog search: PDBe RCSB
PDB	List of PDB id codes 2M41, 4J2J, 4J2L

Gene location (Human)
Chr.	Chromosome 19 (human)
Band	19q13.2	Start	42,268,537 bp
Band	19q13.2	End	42,295,797 bp

Gene location (Mouse)
Chr.	Chromosome 7 (mouse)
Band	7|7 A3	Start	24,967,129 bp
Band	7|7 A3	End	24,993,584 bp
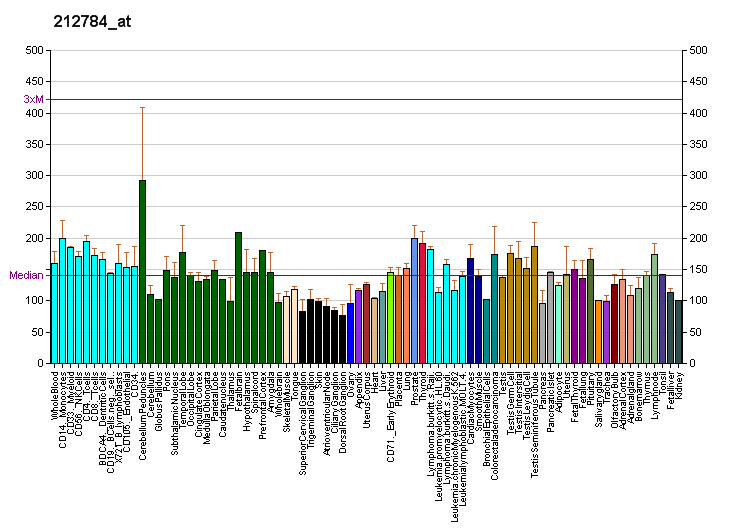
RNA expression pattern
Bgee	Human / Mouse (ortholog); Top expressed in: right hemisphere of cerebellum; olfactory bulb; sural nerve; beta cell; right testis; gastric mucosa; left testis; right ovary; body of uterus; anterior pituitary / Top expressed in: cerebellar cortex; neural layer of retina; bone marrow; olfactory bulb; dentate gyrus of hippocampal formation granule cell; ventricular zone; superior frontal gyrus; striatum of neuraxis; thymus; piriform cortex; More reference expression data
BioGPS	More reference expression data
Gene ontology
Molecular function	DNA binding; protein binding; chromatin binding; DNA-binding transcription factor activity, RNA polymerase II-specific
Cellular component	nucleus; nucleoplasm; intracellular membrane-bounded organelle; protein-containing complex
Biological process	transcription, DNA-templated; regulation of transcription, DNA-templated; negative regulation of transcription by RNA polymerase II; brain development; learning; memory; social behavior; negative regulation of transcription, DNA-templated; lung alveolus development
Sources:Amigo / QuickGO
Orthologs
Databases	NCBI: entry; OMA: entry
Species	Human	Mouse
Entrez	23152	71722
Ensembl	ENSG00000079432	ENSMUSG00000005442
UniProt	Q96RK0	Q924A2
RefSeq (mRNA)	NM_001304815; NM_015125; NM_001379480; NM_001379482; NM_001379484 NM_001379485; NM_001386298	NM_001110131; NM_001110132; NM_027882; NM_001302811
RefSeq (protein)	NP_001291744; NP_055940; NP_001366409; NP_001366411; NP_001366413 NP_001366414	NP_001289740; NP_082158
Location (UCSC)	Chr 19: 42.27 – 42.3 Mb	Chr 7: 24.97 – 24.99 Mb
PubMed search
- Wikidata
View/Edit Human	View/Edit Mouse

Capicua transcriptional repressor is a protein that in humans is encoded by the CIC gene. Capicua functions as a transcriptional repressor in a way that ensures its impact on the progression of cancer, and plays a significant role in the operation of the central nervous system through its interaction with ataxin 1. The name of the protein derives from the Catalan expression cap-i-cua which literally translates to "head-and-tail".

== Structure ==
Capicua is a highly conserved protein, with a lot of similarity between human and Drosophila melanogaster homologs. In the human body, capicua exists in two isoforms, the short (CIC-S) and the long (CIC-L) one, which differ in their N-terminal section. The two evolutionarily conserved domains of the protein are HMG-box (high-mobility group box) and the C1 domain: they work together to recognize specific octameric DNA sequences. Capicua also contains a nuclear localisation sequence that allows it to enter the nucleus of the cell.

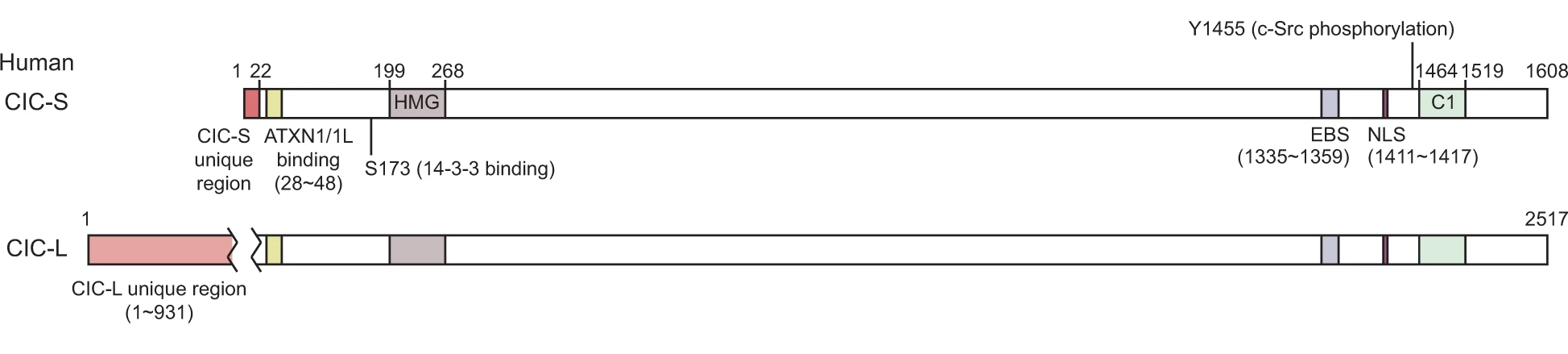
Schematic illustration of human CIC-S and CIC-L forms of the capicua protein. CIC-L has a unique long N-terminal region compared with CIC-S. The amino acid regions of CIC responsible for the interaction with ATXN1/ATXN1L, 14-3-3, and ERK, the HMG box, nuclear localization signal (NLS), c-Src-mediated phosphorylation site, and C1 domain, are depicted. Numbers indicate amino acid positions. EBS: ERK binding site. From a review by Yoontae Lee, 2020.

== Clinical significance ==
A new disorder called autosomal dominant intellectual developmental disorder 45 caused by mutations of the CIC gene was first described in 2017.

=== Spinocerebellar ataxia ===
Capicua forms a complex with ataxin 1 (CIC-ATXN1 complex) and owing to this interaction it plays a crucial role in the development of spinocerebellar ataxia type 1. While in a healthy organism this complex serves to ensure correct cellular function, in patients with ATXN1 mutations a modified complex has a toxic effect on cerebellar cells, resulting in the motor symptoms typical for this disorder. Blocking the formation of the complex in a murine model of ataxia reduces the symptoms.

=== Tumors ===
CIC has been shown to act as a tumor suppressor in numerous types of cancer, and, vice versa, mutations of CIC have been found in some types of tumors. According to a review published in 2020, CIC mutations were most often discovered in oligodendroglioma. A genomic translocation resulting in the formation of a hybrid CIC-DUX4 gene may cause an aggressive Ewing-like sarcoma. Instead of acting as a suppressor, a hybrid protein produced by fusion of CIC and DUX4 has been shown to act as an activator of genes.

According to a review published in 2017, the CIC gene is deleted in 46-53% of analyzed oligodendroglioma tumors as part of the 1p/19q codeletion, a mutation that may also affect the FUBP1 gene.

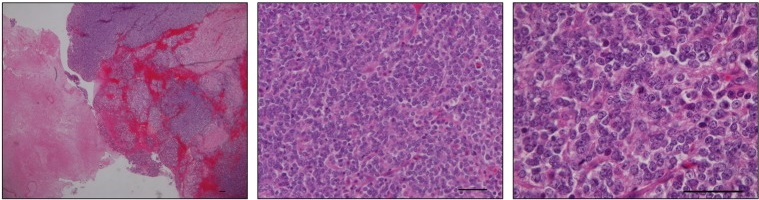
Primary sarcoma with a chimeric CIC-DUX4 protein in a 9 year-old girl, H&E stain, from Nakai et al., 2019.

=== Ongoing research ===
According to a study published in 2021, CIC mutations may be among the causes of cerebral folate deficiency.

== History ==
The CIC gene was first identified in Drosophila in 2000. It was shown to encode a transcriptional repressor participating in the regulation of embryogenesis. In a mutated fly which at the embryonic stage had only the first and the last segments present, with the intermediate segments missing, scientists discovered a mutation of the CIC gene, and this prompted them to call the protein capicua ("head-and-tail" in Catalan).

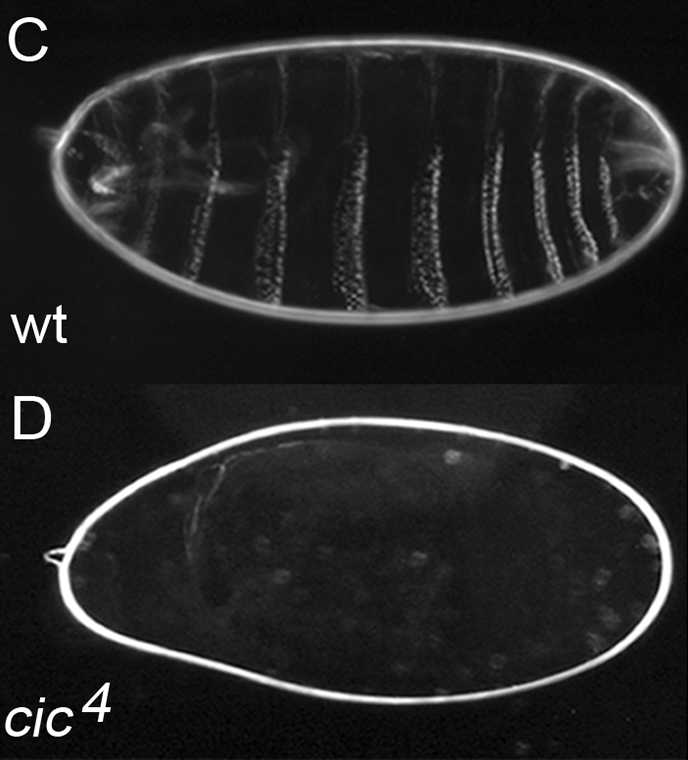
Disrupted embryogenesis in a Drosophila fly due to the cic^{4} mutation affecting the CIC gene. The formation of the fly's intermediate body segments is suppressed, with only the first and the last segments being developed. From Marta Fores et al., 2017.

== Interactions ==
- FOLR1 — capicua has been shown to affect the expression of folate receptor alpha, and CIC mutations might result in cerebral folate deficiency.
- ATXN1 — capicua and ataxin 1 form a complex (ATXN1-CIC) which is crucial for proper brain development.
- DUX4 – chimeric CIC-DUX4 proteins are found in tumors.
- FOXO4 – chimeric CIC-FOXO4 proteins are found in tumors.
- NUTM1 – chimeric CIC-NUTM1 proteins are found in tumors.
- LEUTX – chimeric CIC-LEUTX proteins are found in tumors.
