= C17orf78 =

Mammalian protein found in Homo sapiens

Identifiers
- Aliases: C17orf78, chromosome 17 open reading frame 78
- External IDs: MGI: 3650287; HomoloGene: 82346; GeneCards: C17orf78; OMA:C17orf78 - orthologs

Gene location (Human)
Chr.	Chromosome 17 (human)
Band	17q12	Start	37,375,985 bp
Band	17q12	End	37,392,708 bp

Gene location (Mouse)
Chr.	Chromosome 11 (mouse)
Band	11|11 C	Start	84,039,177 bp
Band	11|11 C	End	84,058,302 bp
RNA expression pattern
Bgee	Human / Mouse (ortholog); Top expressed in: duodenum; testicle; left testis; right testis; endometrium; corpus callosum; lymph node; apex of heart; ganglionic eminence; muscle of thigh / Top expressed in: jejunum; ileum; colon; duodenum; liver; uterus; More reference expression data
BioGPS	n/a
Orthologs
Species	Human	Mouse
Entrez	284099	628813
Ensembl	ENSG00000278505; ENSG00000278145	ENSMUSG00000051452
UniProt	Q8N4C9	Q5QR91
RefSeq (mRNA)	NM_173625; NM_001321399	NM_001037932
RefSeq (protein)	NP_001308328; NP_775896	NP_001033021
Location (UCSC)	Chr 17: 37.38 – 37.39 Mb	Chr 11: 84.04 – 84.06 Mb
PubMed search
- Wikidata
View/Edit Human	View/Edit Mouse

Uncharacterized protein C17orf78 is a protein encoded by the C17orf78 gene in humans. The name denotes the location of the parent gene, being at the 78th open reading frame, on the 17th human chromosome. The protein is highly expressed in the small intestine, especially the duodenum. The function of C17orf78 is not well defined.

== Gene ==
=== Location ===
C17orf78 (Chromosome 17 Open Reading Frame 78) is found on the long arm cytogenetic band 17q12. The genomic sequence spans from base pair position 37,375,985 to 37,392,708 on the forward strand, and constitutes a length of 16,723 base pairs. The neighboring genes include TADA2A, DUSP14, and ACACA.

=== Exons and Introns ===
C17orf78 has 7 exon regions within its encoding area. C17orf78 also has a total of 6 intron regions spanning its sequence.

== Transcripts ==
C17orf78 has two splice variant isoforms. Isoform 1 is encoded by a mRNA sequence that is 1920 base pairs in length. Isoform 2 derives from a mRNA sequence of 1678 base pairs.

== Protein ==
The primary sequence of C17orf78 has been predicted to be 30.55kDa, with an isoelectric point of 9.62.

Uncharacterized protein C17orf78 isoform 1 (C17orf78-204) has a span of 275 amino acids, including all 7 exons. C17orf78 isoform 1 is the principle protein.

Uncharacterized protein C17orf78 isoform 2 (C17orf78-203) has a span of 159 amino acids, constituted from 5 exon regions, which include the 1st, 2nd, 3rd, 6th, and 7th exons of the principle protein.

=== Expression ===
C17orf78 has high expression in the human small intestine, particularly the duodenum and has been detected in small expression levels in the testes and other tissues. Fetal expression lowers in all tissues over time with development except for the intestines, which shows increasing expression over time.

=== Subcellular Location ===
Predictive analysis of C17orf78 by Psort2 places the primary location in the nucleus because of a nuclear localization signal. C17orf78 is also potentially a transmembrane protein due to the presence of a transmembrane region.

== Structure ==
=== Protein ===
C17orf78 secondary structure has been predicted to have several alpha helices and strands as well as beta sheets.

== Regulation ==
=== DNA Promoter ===
The Genomatix tool Gene2Promoter found one viable promoter region. The region was found to span from base pairs 37374332 to 37376025.

=== mRNA ===
The mRNA secondary structure for C17orf78 was found by the online tool RNAfold show a moderate affinity for stem-loop (hairpin) structures.

=== Post Translational Modification ===
Phosphorylation is predicted to occur at a number of sites on C17orf78. PKC-phosphorylation and CK2 phosphorylation are predicted to have various sites on C17orf78 with high confidence.

N-linked glycosylation is predicted to occur at three locations on C17orf78. Asparagine linked glycosylation was predicted to occur on C17orf78 orthologs with high confidence.

Myristolyation has been predicted to occur on C17orf78 by the ExPASy tool Motif Scan.

== Homology & Evolution ==
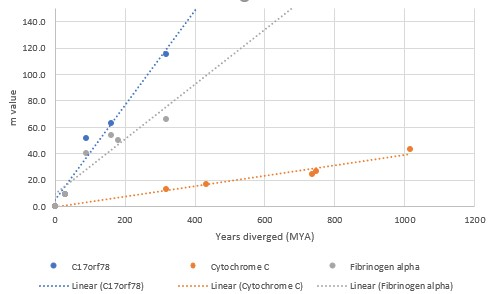
The evolution rate for c17orf78 compared to fibrinogen alpha and cytochrome c

C17orf78 orthologs have been identified in mammals, birds, and reptiles. It is a rapidly evolving gene, with around 40 base pairs mutating every 100 million years. There are no known paralogs of this gene in humans.

Scientific name	Common name	Taxonomic group	Date of Divergence (MYA)	Accession number	Protein Length (aa)	Identity (%)	Similarity (%)
Homo sapiens	Human	Primates	0	NP_775896.3	275	100	100
Mus musculus	Mouse	Rodentia	89	NP_001033021.2	290	59.7	72.0
Sus scrofa	Wild Boar	Artiodactyla	94	XP_013845397.2	287	69.7	80.8
Ovis aries	Sheep	Artiodactyla	94	XP_027831111.1	280	68.3	79.4
Eptesicus fuscus	Big Brown Bat	Chiroptera	94	XP_028013352.1	287	66.7	74.7
Mustela erminea	Stoat	Carnivora	94	XP_032175349.1	300	58.8	67.7
Orycteropus afer afer	Aardvark	Tubulidentata	102	XP_007946081.1	286	71.2	80.9
Loxodonta africana	African Bush Elephant	Proboscidea	102	XP_003414613.1	282	67.6	77.8
Elephantulus edwardii	Cape Elephant Shrew	Macroscelidea	102	XP_006881725.1	312	57.6	67.5
Phascolarctos cinereus	Koala	Diprotodontia	160	XP_020847101.1	286	53.3	66.2
Vombatus ursinus	Common Wombat	Diprotodontia	160	XP_027726443.1	245	45.6	59.8
Trachemys scripta elegans	Red-Eared Slider Turtle	Testudines	318	XP_034608235.1	257	31.6	46.2
Apertyx rowi	Okarito Kiwi	Apterygiformes	318	XP_025937346.1	270	31.3	50.2
Chelonia mydas	Green Sea Turtle	Testudines	318	XP_027675993.1	270	28.9	39.7
Terrapene carolina triunguis	Three-Toed Box Turtle	Testudines	318	XP_029768387.1	299	28.4	41.0
Pelodiscus sinensis	Chinese Softshell Turtle	Testudines	318	XP_025035086.1	258	28.2	40.8
Melopsittacus undulatus	Budgerigar	Psittaciformes	318	XP_012985804.2	255	26.7	41.1
Oxyura jamaicensis	Ruddy Duck	Anseriformes	318	XP_035199171.1	270	25.8	41.2
Chelonoidis abingdonii	Pinta Island Tortoise	Testudines	318	XP_032635246.1	262	24.2	36.3
Anas platyrhynchos	Mallard	Anseriformes	318	XP_021123240.1	232	23.3	34.3
