= MXD4 =

Protein-coding gene in the species Homo sapiens

Identifiers
- Aliases: MXD4, MAD4, MST149, MSTP149, bHLHc12, MAX dimerization protein 4
- External IDs: MGI: 104991; GeneCards: MXD4

Gene location (Human)
| Chr. | Chromosome 4 (human) |
| Band | 4p16.3 | Start | 2,247,432 bp |
| Band | 4p16.3 | End | 2,262,109 bp |

Gene location (Mouse)
| Chr. | Chromosome 5 (mouse) |
| Band | 5 B2|5 17.84 cM | Start | 34,331,227 bp |
| Band | 5 B2|5 17.84 cM | End | 34,345,064 bp |
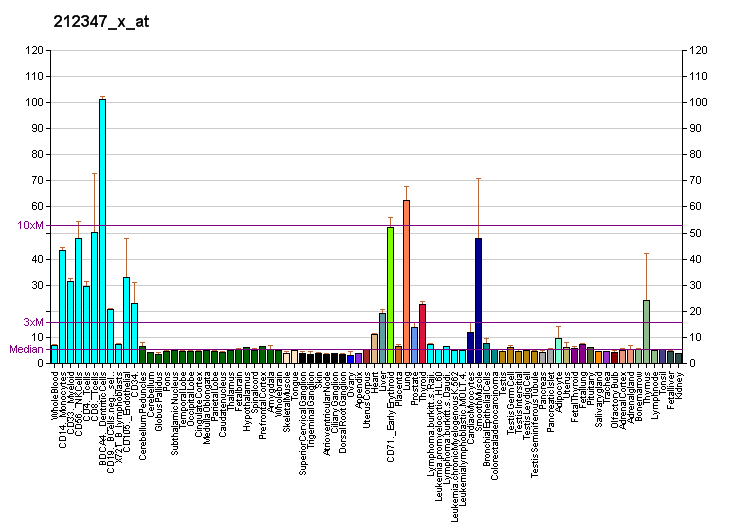

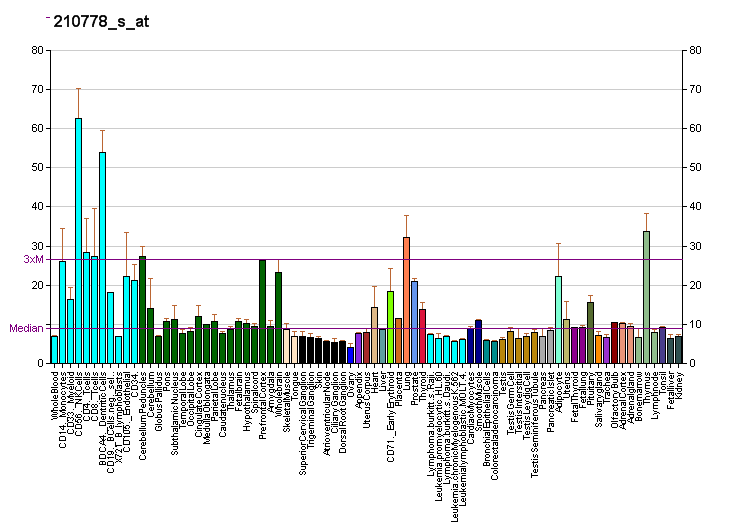

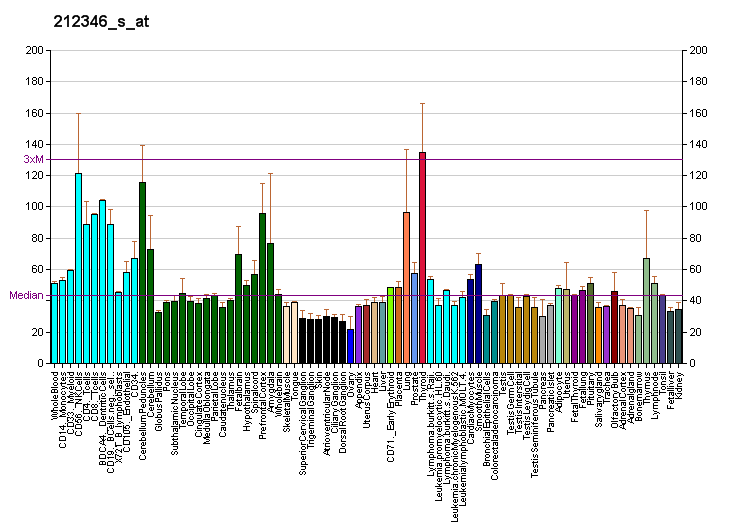
RNA expression pattern
| Bgee | Human / Mouse (ortholog); Top expressed in: right hemisphere of cerebellum; anterior pituitary; right lung; apex of heart; right adrenal cortex; Descending thoracic aorta; tibial nerve; ascending aorta; right coronary artery; right lobe of thyroid gland / Top expressed in: ascending aorta; aortic valve; Paneth cell; fossa; Rostral migratory stream; left lung lobe; calvaria; vestibular sensory epithelium; thymus; vestibular membrane of cochlear duct; More reference expression data |
| BioGPS | More reference expression data |
Gene ontology
| Molecular function | DNA binding; protein binding; protein dimerization activity; transcription corepressor activity; DNA-binding transcription factor activity, RNA polymerase II-specific |
| Cellular component | nucleus |
| Biological process | regulation of transcription, DNA-templated; negative regulation of transcription by RNA polymerase II; transcription, DNA-templated; negative regulation of cell population proliferation |
Sources:Amigo / QuickGO
Orthologs
| Databases | NCBI: entry; OMA: entry |
| Species | Human | Mouse |
| Entrez | 10608 | 17122 |
| Ensembl | ENSG00000123933 | ENSMUSG00000037235 |
| UniProt | Q14582 | Q60948 |
| RefSeq (mRNA) | NM_006454 | NM_010753 |
| RefSeq (protein) | NP_006445 | n/a |
| Location (UCSC) | Chr 4: 2.25 – 2.26 Mb | Chr 5: 34.33 – 34.35 Mb |
| PubMed search |
- Wikidata
| View/Edit Human | View/Edit Mouse |

Max-interacting transcriptional repressor MAD4 is a protein that in humans is encoded by the MXD4 gene.

== Function ==
This gene is a member of the MAD gene family . The MAD genes encode basic helix-loop-helix-leucine zipper proteins that heterodimerize with MAX protein, forming a transcriptional repression complex. The MAD proteins compete for MAX binding with MYC, which heterodimerizes with MAX forming a transcriptional activation complex. Studies in rodents suggest that the MAD genes are tumor suppressors and contribute to the regulation of cell growth in differentiating tissues.
