= MAX dimerization protein MGA =

Protein found in humans

MGA

Identifiers
- Aliases: MGA, MAD5, MXD5, MAX dimerization protein, MAX dimerization protein MGA
- External IDs: OMIM: 616061; MGI: 1352483; GeneCards: MGA

Gene location (Human)
Chr.	Chromosome 15 (human)
Band	15q15.1	Start	41,621,134 bp
Band	15q15.1	End	41,773,081 bp

Gene location (Mouse)
Chr.	Chromosome 2 (mouse)
Band	2|2 E5	Start	119,727,709 bp
Band	2|2 E5	End	119,800,062 bp
RNA expression pattern
Bgee	Human / Mouse (ortholog); Top expressed in: Achilles tendon; oocyte; tendon of biceps brachii; secondary oocyte; testicle; corpus callosum; internal globus pallidus; sperm; sural nerve; pylorus / Top expressed in: genital tubercle; tail of embryo; pineal gland; cumulus cell; Gonadal ridge; pituitary gland; vas deferens; ascending aorta; lobe of cerebellum; zygote; More reference expression data
BioGPS	n/a
Gene ontology
Molecular function	DNA-binding transcription factor activity; DNA binding; protein binding; protein dimerization activity; DNA-binding transcription factor activity, RNA polymerase II-specific
Cellular component	nucleus; nucleoplasm; MLL1 complex
Biological process	regulation of transcription, DNA-templated; transcription, DNA-templated; negative regulation of G0 to G1 transition; regulation of transcription by RNA polymerase II
Sources:Amigo / QuickGO
Orthologs
Databases	NCBI: entry; OMA: entry
Species	Human	Mouse
Entrez	23269	29808
Ensembl	ENSG00000174197	ENSMUSG00000033943
UniProt	Q8IWI9	A2AWL7
RefSeq (mRNA)	NM_001080541; NM_001164273; NM_001400225; NM_001400242; NM_001400243 NM_001400244; NM_001400245; NM_001400246; NM_001400247	NM_001164274; NM_013720
RefSeq (protein)	NP_001074010; NP_001157745	NP_001157746; NP_038748
Location (UCSC)	Chr 15: 41.62 – 41.77 Mb	Chr 2: 119.73 – 119.8 Mb
PubMed search
- Wikidata
View/Edit Human	View/Edit Mouse

MAX dimerization protein MGA is a protein that in humans is encoded by the gene MGA. This protein is a transcription factor with dual-specificity, regulating the expression of both MAX-target and T-box genes.

== Medical significance ==
Pathogenic mutations in MGA are associated with primary amenorrhea or early menopause, which has been designated as premature ovarian failure-26 (POF26). This follows an autosomal dominant pattern of inheritance.
