= NSD3 =

Protein-coding gene in the species Homo sapiens

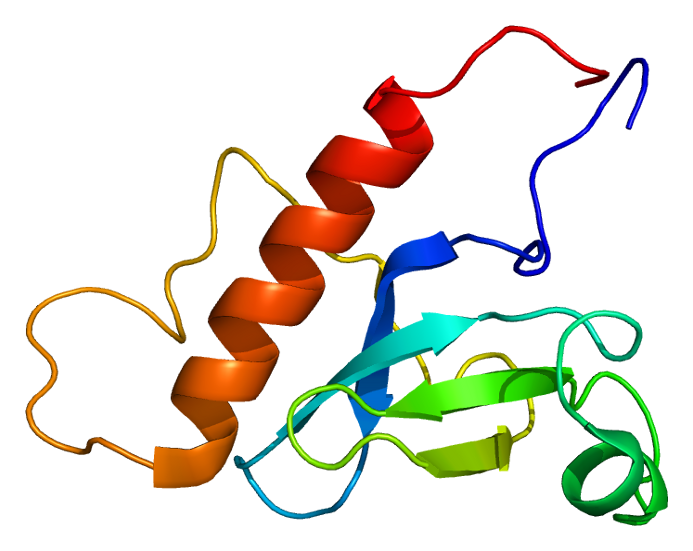

Identifiers
- Aliases: NSD3, pp14328, WHSC1L1, WHISTLE, Wolf-Hirschhorn syndrome candidate 1-like 1, nuclear receptor binding SET domain protein 3, KMT3G, KMT3F
- External IDs: OMIM: 607083; MGI: 2142581; GeneCards: NSD3
Available structures
PDB	Ortholog search: PDBe RCSB
PDB	List of PDB id codes 2DAQ, 4GND, 4GNE, 4GNF, 4GNG, 4RXJ, 4YZ8, 2ND1, 2NCZ
Enzyme activity
EC #	BRENDA	ExPASy	KEGG	MetaCyc
2.1.1.370	↗	↗	↗	↗
2.1.1.371	↗	↗	↗	↗

Gene location (Human)
Chr.	Chromosome 8 (human)
Band	8p11.23	Start	38,269,704 bp
Band	8p11.23	End	38,382,272 bp

Gene location (Mouse)
Chr.	Chromosome 8 (mouse)
Band	8|8 A2	Start	26,091,617 bp
Band	8|8 A2	End	26,209,694 bp
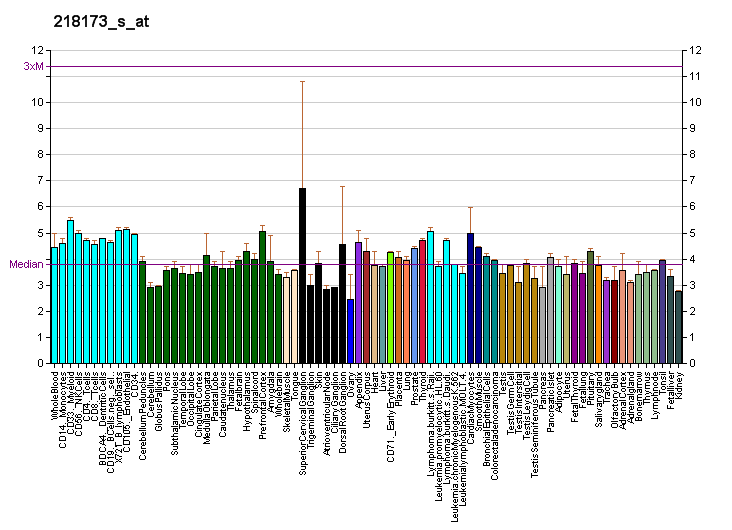

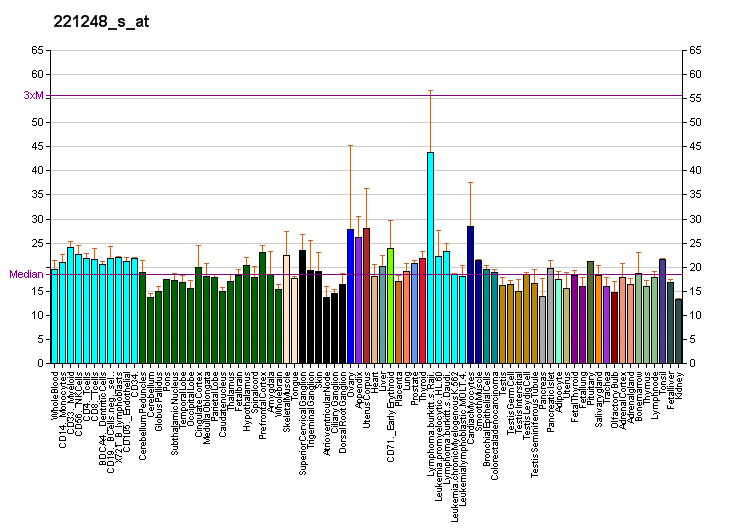
RNA expression pattern
Bgee	Human / Mouse (ortholog); Top expressed in: pylorus; epithelium of colon; ganglionic eminence; cardia; ventricular zone; entorhinal cortex; caput epididymis; sural nerve; nipple; lactiferous duct / Top expressed in: hand; lacrimal gland; superior cervical ganglion; seminal vesicula; otic vesicle; granulocyte; human fetus; body of femur; parotid gland; otolith organ; More reference expression data
BioGPS	More reference expression data
Gene ontology
Molecular function	methyltransferase activity; transferase activity; protein binding; metal ion binding; histone-lysine N-methyltransferase activity; transcription coactivator activity; histone methyltransferase activity (H3-K36 specific)
Cellular component	nucleus; nucleoplasm; chromosome; chromatin
Biological process	histone methylation; methylation; regulation of transcription, DNA-templated; transcription, DNA-templated; histone lysine methylation; chromatin organization; positive regulation of transcription, DNA-templated; positive regulation of histone H3-K36 trimethylation; histone H3-K36 methylation
Sources:Amigo / QuickGO
Orthologs
Databases	NCBI: entry; OMA: entry
Species	Human	Mouse
Entrez	54904	234135
Ensembl	ENSG00000147548	ENSMUSG00000054823
UniProt	Q9BZ95	Q6P2L6
RefSeq (mRNA)	NM_017778; NM_023034	NM_001001735; NM_001081269; NM_001308481; NM_001308482
RefSeq (protein)	NP_060248; NP_075447	NP_001001735; NP_001074738; NP_001295410; NP_001295411
Location (UCSC)	Chr 8: 38.27 – 38.38 Mb	Chr 8: 26.09 – 26.21 Mb
PubMed search
- Wikidata
View/Edit Human	View/Edit Mouse

Histone-lysine N-methyltransferase NSD3 is an enzyme that in humans is encoded by the NSD3 gene.

This gene is related to the Wolf–Hirschhorn syndrome candidate-1 gene (NSD2) and encodes a protein with PWWP (proline-tryptophan-tryptophan-proline) domains. This protein methylates histone H3 at lysine residues 4 and 27, which represses gene transcription. Two alternatively spliced variants have been described.

The NSD3 gene is amplified in several cancers, including lung cancer and head and neck cancer, and may play a role in carcinogenesis.
