= Vestigial like family member 4 =

Protein-coding gene in the species Homo sapiens

VGLL4

Identifiers
- Aliases: VGLL4, VGL-4, vestigial like family member 4
- External IDs: MGI: 2652840; GeneCards: VGLL4

Gene location (Human)
Chr.	Chromosome 3 (human)
Band	3p25.3-p25.2	Start	11,556,069 bp
Band	3p25.3-p25.2	End	11,771,350 bp

Gene location (Mouse)
Chr.	Chromosome 6 (mouse)
Band	6|6 E3	Start	114,837,589 bp
Band	6|6 E3	End	114,946,955 bp
RNA expression pattern
Bgee	Human / Mouse (ortholog); Top expressed in: tibia; nipple; trigeminal ganglion; pylorus; retinal pigment epithelium; renal medulla; left ovary; spinal ganglia; trachea; saphenous vein / Top expressed in: Rostral migratory stream; internal carotid artery; external carotid artery; lip; genital tubercle; epithelium of lens; tail of embryo; ventricular zone; granulocyte; right kidney; More reference expression data
BioGPS	n/a
Gene ontology
Molecular function	protein binding; transcription coactivator binding
Cellular component	nucleus
Biological process	regulation of transcription, DNA-templated; transcription, DNA-templated; negative regulation of transcription, DNA-templated
Sources:Amigo / QuickGO
Orthologs
Databases	NCBI: entry; OMA: entry
Species	Human	Mouse
Entrez	9686	232334
Ensembl	ENSG00000144560	ENSMUSG00000030315
UniProt	Q14135	Q80V24
RefSeq (mRNA)	NM_001128219; NM_001128220; NM_001128221; NM_001284390; NM_001284391 NM_014667	NM_177683; NM_001356371
RefSeq (protein)	NP_001121691; NP_001121692; NP_001121693; NP_001271319; NP_001271320 NP_055482	NP_808351; NP_001343300
Location (UCSC)	Chr 3: 11.56 – 11.77 Mb	Chr 6: 114.84 – 114.95 Mb
PubMed search
- Wikidata
View/Edit Human	View/Edit Mouse

Vestigial like family member 4 is a protein that in humans is encoded by the VGLL4 gene.
