= TEAD2 =

Protein-coding gene in the species Homo sapiens

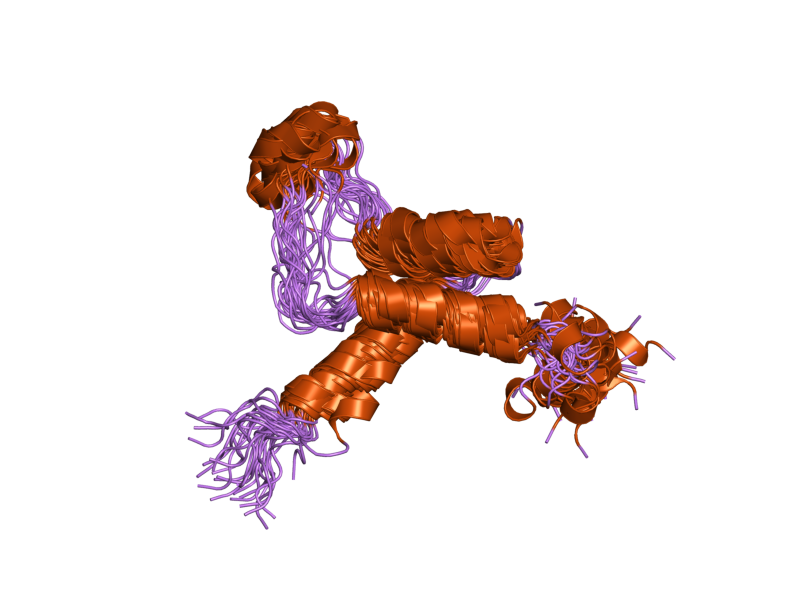

Identifiers
- Aliases: TEAD2, ETF, TEAD-2, TEF-4, TEF4, TEA domain transcription factor 2
- External IDs: OMIM: 601729; MGI: 104904; GeneCards: TEAD2
Available structures
PDB	Ortholog search: PDBe RCSB
PDB	List of PDB id codes 3L15, 5DQE, 5DQ8, 5EMV, 5HGU

Gene location (Human)
Chr.	Chromosome 19 (human)
Band	19q13.33	Start	49,340,595 bp
Band	19q13.33	End	49,362,457 bp

Gene location (Mouse)
Chr.	Chromosome 7 (mouse)
Band	7 B3|7 29.19 cM	Start	44,865,177 bp
Band	7 B3|7 29.19 cM	End	44,883,068 bp
RNA expression pattern
Bgee	Human / Mouse (ortholog); Top expressed in: vena cava; apex of heart; ganglionic eminence; tendon of biceps brachii; muscle layer of sigmoid colon; left ventricle; right auricle of heart; smooth muscle tissue; ventricular zone; canal of the cervix / Top expressed in: ventricular zone; epiblast; genital tubercle; tail of embryo; otic vesicle; mandibular prominence; medial ganglionic eminence; maxillary prominence; abdominal wall; hand; More reference expression data
BioGPS	n/a
Gene ontology
Molecular function	DNA-binding transcription factor activity; DNA binding; protein binding; transcription factor activity, RNA polymerase II distal enhancer sequence-specific binding; sequence-specific DNA binding; transcription coactivator binding; protein heterodimerization activity; disordered domain specific binding; DNA-binding transcription factor activity, RNA polymerase II-specific
Cellular component	nucleoplasm; cytosol; intracellular membrane-bounded organelle; nucleus; transcription regulator complex
Biological process	transcription initiation from RNA polymerase II promoter; regulation of transcription, DNA-templated; hippo signaling; transcription, DNA-templated; vasculogenesis; embryonic heart tube morphogenesis; regulation of stem cell differentiation; notochord development; negative regulation of cell death; neural tube closure; paraxial mesoderm development; lateral mesoderm development; cellular response to retinoic acid; positive regulation of transcription by RNA polymerase II; embryonic organ development; positive regulation of transcription, DNA-templated; protein-containing complex assembly
Sources:Amigo / QuickGO
Orthologs
Databases	NCBI: entry; OMA: entry
Species	Human	Mouse
Entrez	8463	21677
Ensembl	ENSG00000074219	ENSMUSG00000030796
UniProt	Q15562	P48301
RefSeq (mRNA)	NM_001256658; NM_001256659; NM_001256660; NM_001256661; NM_001256662 NM_003598	NM_001285498; NM_001285500; NM_011565; NM_001379272; NM_001379273
RefSeq (protein)	NP_001243587; NP_001243588; NP_001243589; NP_001243590; NP_001243591 NP_003589	NP_001272427; NP_001272429; NP_035695; NP_001366201; NP_001366202
Location (UCSC)	Chr 19: 49.34 – 49.36 Mb	Chr 7: 44.87 – 44.88 Mb
PubMed search
- Wikidata
View/Edit Human	View/Edit Mouse

TEAD2 (ETF, ETEF-1, TEF-4), together with TEAD1, defines a novel family of transcription factors, the TEAD family, highly conserved through evolution. TEAD proteins were notably found in Drosophila (Scalloped), C. elegans (egl -44), S. cerevisiae and A. nidulans. TEAD2 has been less studied than TEAD1 but a few studies revealed its role during development.

== Function ==
TEAD2 is a member of the mammalian TEAD transcription factor family (initially named the transcriptional enhancer factor (TEF) family), which contain the TEA/ATTS DNA-binding domain. Members of the family in mammals are TEAD1, TEAD2, TEAD3, TEAD4.

== Tissue distribution ==
TEAD2 is selectively expressed in a subset of embryonic tissues including the cerebellum, testis, and distal portions of the forelimb and hindlimb buds, as well as the tail bud, but it is essentially absent from adult tissues. TEAD2 has also been shown to be expressed very early during development, i.e. from the 2-cell stage.

== TEAD orthologs ==
TEAD proteins are found in many organisms under different names, assuming different functions. For example, in Saccharomyces cerevisiae TEC-1 regulates the transposable element TY1 and is involved in pseudohyphale growth (the elongated shape that yeasts take when grown in nutrient-poor conditions). In Aspergillus nidulans, the TEA domain protein ABAA regulates the differentiation of conidiophores. In drosophila the transcription factor Scalloped is involved in the development of the wing disc, survival and cell growth. Finally in Xenopus, it has been demonstrated that the homolog of TEAD regulates muscle differentiation.

== Function ==
- Regulation of mouse neural development
- Neuron proliferation
- Regulation of proliferation
- Regulation of apoptosis

== Post transcriptional modifications ==
TEAD1 can be palmitoylated on a conserved cysteine at the C-term of the protein. This post-translational modification is critical for proper folding of TEAD proteins and their stability. Based on bioinformatics evidence TEAD2 can be ubiquitinylated at Lys75 and several phosphorylation sites exist in the protein.

== Cofactors ==
TEAD transcription factors have to associate with cofactors to be able to induce the transcription of target genes. Concerning TEAD2 very few studies have shown specific cofactors. But due to the high homology between the TEAD family members its believed that TEAD proteins may share cofactors. Here are presented the cofactor that interact with TEAD2.

- TEAD2 interacts with all members of the SRC family of steroid receptor coactivators. It has been shown in HeLa cells that TEAD2 and SRC induce gene expression.
- SRF (Serum response factor) and TEAD2 interact through their DNA binding domain, respectively the MADS domain and the TEA domain. In vitro studies demonstrated that this interaction leads to the activation of the skeletal muscle α-actin promoter.
- TEAD proteins and MEF2 (myocyte enhancer factor 2) interact physically. The binding of MEF2 on the DNA induces and potentiates TEAD2 recruitment at MCAT sequences that are adjacent to MEF2 binding sites.
- The four Vestigial-like (VGLL) proteins are able to interact with all TEADs. The precise function of TEAD and VGLL interaction is still poorly understood. It has been shown that TEAD/VGLL1 complexes promote anchorage-independent cell proliferation in prostate cancer cell lines suggesting a role in cancer progression.
- The interaction between YAP (Yes Associated Protein 65), TAZ, a transcriptional coactivator paralog to YAP, and all TEAD proteins was demonstrated both in vitro and in vivo. In both cases the interaction of the proteins leads to increased TEAD transcriptional activity. YAP/TAZ are effectors of the Hippo tumor suppressor pathway that restricts organ growth by keeping in check cell proliferation and promoting apoptosis in mammals and also in Drosophila.

== Clinical significance ==
Recent animal models indicating a possible association of TEAD2 with anencephaly.
