= TEAD3 =

Protein-coding gene in the species Homo sapiens

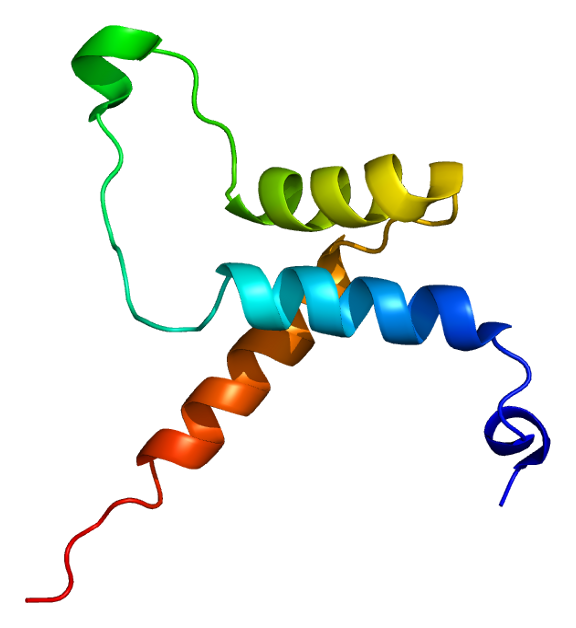

Identifiers
- Aliases: TEAD3, DTEF-1, ETFR-1, TEAD-3, TEAD5, TEF-5, TEF5, TEA domain transcription factor 3
- External IDs: OMIM: 603170; MGI: 109241; GeneCards: TEAD3
Available structures
PDB	Ortholog search: PDBe RCSB
PDB	List of PDB id codes 5EMW

Gene location (Human)
Chr.	Chromosome 6 (human)
Band	6p21.31	Start	35,473,597 bp
Band	6p21.31	End	35,497,079 bp

Gene location (Mouse)
Chr.	Chromosome 17 (mouse)
Band	17 A3.3|17 14.66 cM	Start	28,550,645 bp
Band	17 A3.3|17 14.66 cM	End	28,569,791 bp
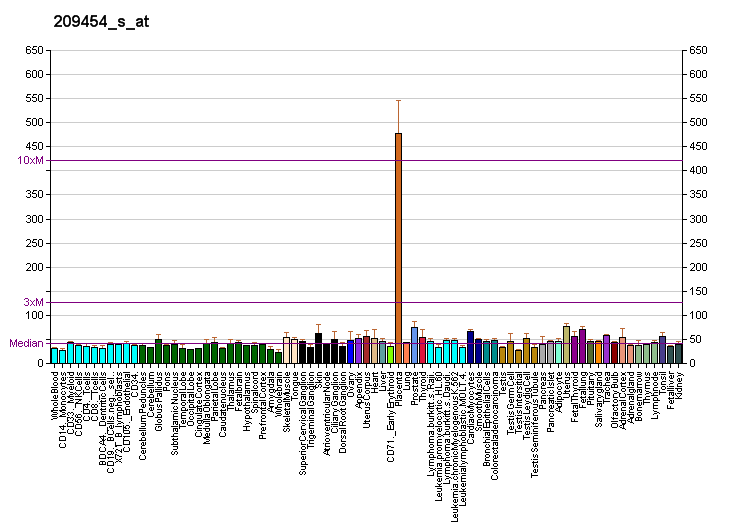
RNA expression pattern
Bgee	Human / Mouse (ortholog); Top expressed in: muscle layer of sigmoid colon; gastric mucosa; body of uterus; left uterine tube; popliteal artery; tibial arteries; right coronary artery; thoracic aorta; ascending aorta; ectocervix / Top expressed in: lip; genital tubercle; esophagus; trophoblast giant cell; ventricular zone; muscle of thigh; neural layer of retina; urethra; female urethra; molar; More reference expression data
BioGPS	More reference expression data
Gene ontology
Molecular function	DNA-binding transcription factor activity; DNA binding; protein binding; sequence-specific DNA binding; DNA-binding transcription factor activity, RNA polymerase II-specific
Cellular component	nucleoplasm; nucleus; transcription regulator complex
Biological process	regulation of transcription by RNA polymerase II; female pregnancy; transcription initiation from RNA polymerase II promoter; regulation of transcription, DNA-templated; hippo signaling; transcription, DNA-templated; asymmetric neuroblast division; positive regulation of transcription by RNA polymerase II; embryonic organ development
Sources:Amigo / QuickGO
Orthologs
Databases	NCBI: entry; OMA: entry
Species	Human	Mouse
Entrez	7005	21678
Ensembl	ENSG00000007866	ENSMUSG00000002249
UniProt	Q99594	P70210
RefSeq (mRNA)	NM_003214; NM_001395214	NM_001098226; NM_001204156; NM_011566
RefSeq (protein)	NP_003205	NP_001091696; NP_001191085; NP_035696
Location (UCSC)	Chr 6: 35.47 – 35.5 Mb	Chr 17: 28.55 – 28.57 Mb
PubMed search
- Wikidata
View/Edit Human	View/Edit Mouse

Transcriptional enhancer factor TEF-5 is a protein that in humans is encoded by the TEAD3 gene.

== Function ==
This gene product is a member of the transcriptional enhancer factor (TEF) family of transcription factors, which contain the TEA/ATTS DNA-binding domain. Members of the family in mammals are TEAD1, TEAD2, TEAD3, TEAD4. Transcriptional coregulators, such as WWTR1 (TAZ) bind to these transcription factors. TEAD3 is predominantly expressed in the placenta and is involved in the transactivation of the chorionic somatomammotropin-B gene enhancer. It is expressed in the nervous system and muscle in fish embryos. Translation of this protein is initiated at a non-AUG (AUA) start codon.
