= TEAD4 =

Protein-coding gene in the species Homo sapiens

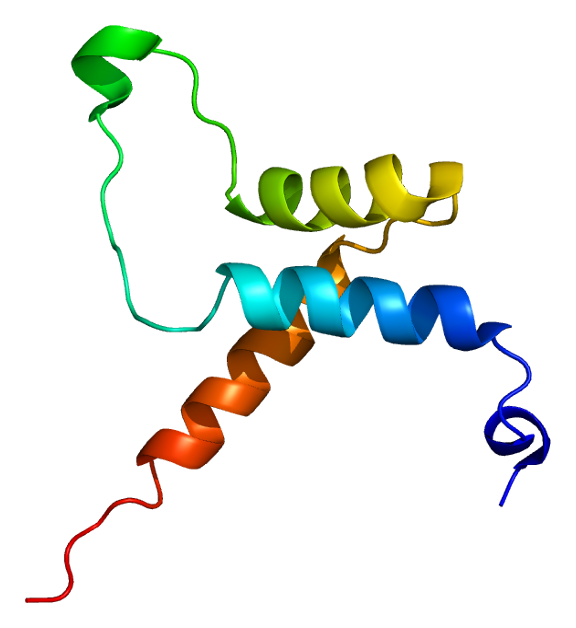

Identifiers
- Aliases: TEAD4, EFTR-2, RTEF1, TCF13L1, TEF-3, TEF3, TEFR-1, hRTEF-1B, TEA domain transcription factor 4
- External IDs: OMIM: 601714; MGI: 106907; GeneCards: TEAD4

Gene location (Human)
Chr.	Chromosome 12 (human)
Band	12p13.33	Start	2,959,330 bp
Band	12p13.33	End	3,040,676 bp

Gene location (Mouse)
Chr.	Chromosome 6 (mouse)
Band	6 F3|6 62.92 cM	Start	128,201,251 bp
Band	6 F3|6 62.92 cM	End	128,277,786 bp
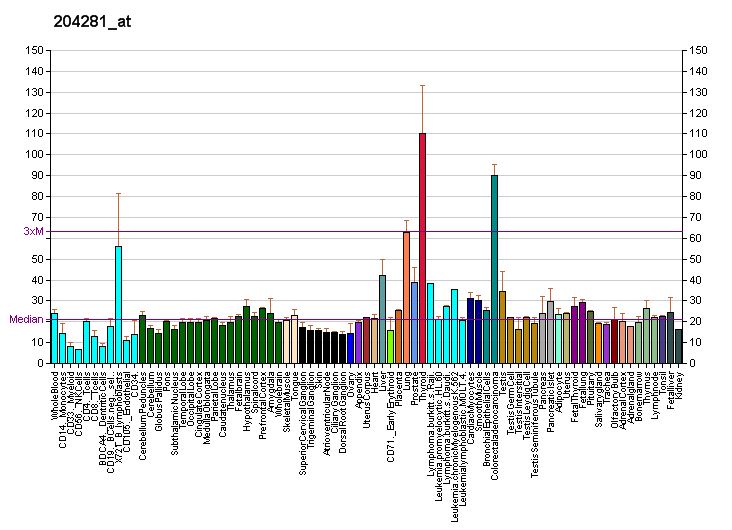

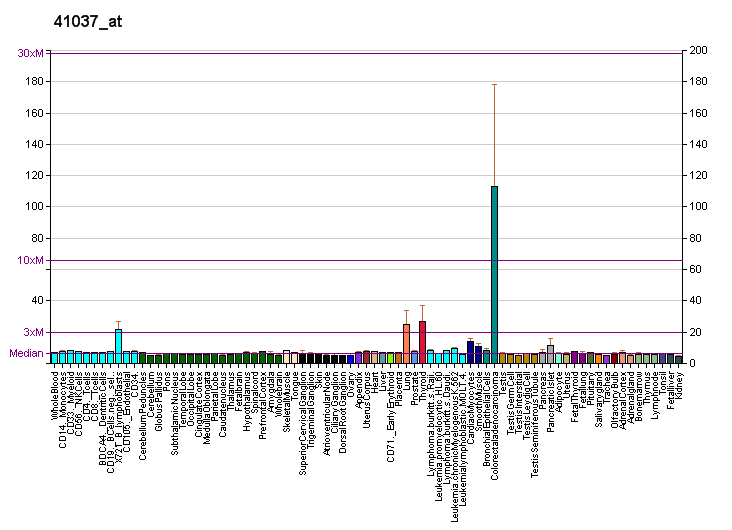
RNA expression pattern
Bgee	Human / Mouse (ortholog); Top expressed in: muscle of thigh; gastrocnemius muscle; glutes; triceps brachii muscle; tibialis anterior muscle; quadriceps femoris muscle; skeletal muscle tissue; vastus lateralis muscle; body of pancreas; biceps brachii / Top expressed in: morula; morula; yolk sac; perirhinal cortex; decidua; entorhinal cortex; Ileal epithelium; choroid plexus of fourth ventricle; gastrula; CA3 field; More reference expression data
BioGPS	More reference expression data
Gene ontology
Molecular function	DNA-binding transcription factor activity; DNA binding; protein binding; sequence-specific DNA binding; DNA-binding transcription factor activity, RNA polymerase II-specific
Cellular component	nucleoplasm; transcription regulator complex; nucleus
Biological process	regulation of transcription by RNA polymerase II; skeletal system development; muscle organ development; transcription initiation from RNA polymerase II promoter; regulation of transcription, DNA-templated; hippo signaling; transcription, DNA-templated; positive regulation of transcription by RNA polymerase II; embryonic organ development
Sources:Amigo / QuickGO
Orthologs
Databases	NCBI: entry; OMA: entry
Species	Human	Mouse
Entrez	7004	21679
Ensembl	ENSG00000197905	ENSMUSG00000030353
UniProt	Q15561	Q62296
RefSeq (mRNA)	NM_201443; NM_003213; NM_201441	NM_001080979; NM_011567
RefSeq (protein)	NP_003204; NP_958849; NP_958851	NP_001074448; NP_035697
Location (UCSC)	Chr 12: 2.96 – 3.04 Mb	Chr 6: 128.2 – 128.28 Mb
PubMed search
- Wikidata
View/Edit Human	View/Edit Mouse

Transcriptional enhancer factor TEAD4 (previously known as TEF-3) is a protein that in humans is encoded by the TEAD4 gene.

== Function ==
This gene product is a member of the transcriptional enhancer factor (TEF) family of transcription factors, which contain the TEA/ATTS DNA-binding domain. Members of the family in mammals are TEAD1, TEAD2, TEAD3, TEAD4. TEAD4 is preferentially expressed in the skeletal muscle, and binds to the M-CAT regulatory element found in promoters of muscle-specific genes to direct their gene expression.

Alternatively spliced transcripts encoding distinct isoforms, some of which are translated through the use of a non-AUG (UUG) initiation codon, have been described for this gene. Gene ablation experiments in mice (i.e. knockout mice) showed that TEAD4 is essential for the formation of blastocysts during preimplantation embryo development.

Although it was originally hypothesized to be essential for specification of trophectoderm lineage, it was later shown that functional trophectoderm can be produced leading to formation of blastocysts under in vitro conditions that suppress oxidative stress. Transcriptional coregulators, such as WWTR1 (TAZ) bind to members in this transcription factor family.
