= TEAD1 =

Protein-coding gene in the species Homo sapiens

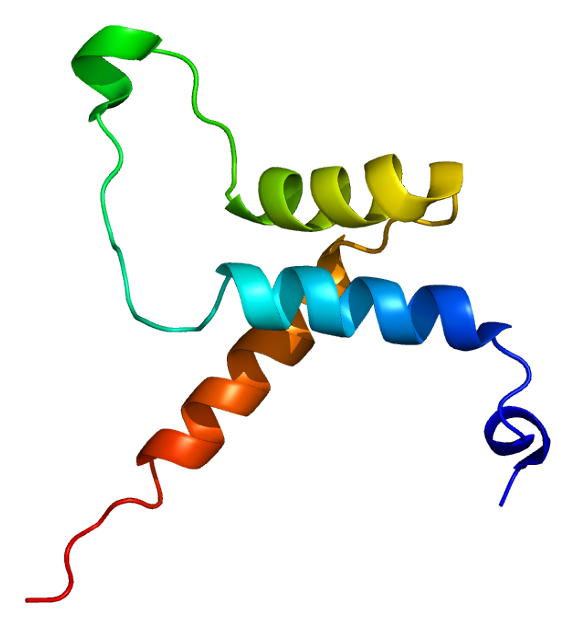

Identifiers
- Aliases: TEAD1, AA, NTEF-1, REF1, TCF-13, TCF13, TEAD-1, TEF-1, TEA domain transcription factor 1
- External IDs: OMIM: 189967; MGI: 101876; GeneCards: TEAD1
Available structures
PDB	Ortholog search: PDBe RCSB
PDB	List of PDB id codes 2HZD, 3KYS, 4RE1, 4Z8E

Gene location (Human)
Chr.	Chromosome 11 (human)
Band	11p15.3	Start	12,674,421 bp
Band	11p15.3	End	12,944,737 bp

Gene location (Mouse)
Chr.	Chromosome 7 (mouse)
Band	7|7 F1	Start	112,278,525 bp
Band	7|7 F1	End	112,506,014 bp
RNA expression pattern
Bgee	Human / Mouse (ortholog); Top expressed in: Skeletal muscle tissue of rectus abdominis; biceps brachii; Skeletal muscle tissue of biceps brachii; body of tongue; tail of epididymis; trigeminal ganglion; bronchial epithelial cell; saphenous vein; sural nerve; renal medulla / Top expressed in: digastric muscle; temporal muscle; sternocleidomastoid muscle; triceps brachii muscle; ankle; atrium; genital tubercle; atrioventricular valve; aortic valve; retinal pigment epithelium; More reference expression data
BioGPS	n/a
Gene ontology
Molecular function	DNA-binding transcription factor activity; protein binding; DNA binding; transcription factor activity, RNA polymerase II core promoter proximal region sequence-specific binding; transcription coactivator binding; sequence-specific DNA binding; protein heterodimerization activity; cis-regulatory region sequence-specific DNA binding; DNA-binding transcription factor activity, RNA polymerase II-specific
Cellular component	nucleus; nucleoplasm; transcription regulator complex
Biological process	regulation of transcription, DNA-templated; hippo signaling; transcription, DNA-templated; transcription initiation from RNA polymerase II promoter; positive regulation of pri-miRNA transcription by RNA polymerase II; positive regulation of transcription, DNA-templated; embryonic organ development; positive regulation of transcription by RNA polymerase II; protein-containing complex assembly
Sources:Amigo / QuickGO
Orthologs
Databases	NCBI: entry; OMA: entry
Species	Human	Mouse
Entrez	7003	21676
Ensembl	ENSG00000187079	ENSMUSG00000055320
UniProt	P28347	P30051
RefSeq (mRNA)	NM_021961	NM_001166584; NM_001166585; NM_009346; NM_175559
RefSeq (protein)	NP_068780	NP_001160056; NP_001160057; NP_033372
Location (UCSC)	Chr 11: 12.67 – 12.94 Mb	Chr 7: 112.28 – 112.51 Mb
PubMed search
- Wikidata
View/Edit Human	View/Edit Mouse

Transcriptional enhancer factor TEF-1 also known as TEA domain family member 1 (TEAD1) and transcription factor 13 (TCF-13) is a protein that in humans is encoded by the TEAD1 gene. TEAD1 was the first member of the mammalian TEAD family of transcription factors to be identified. Other members are TEAD2, TEAD3, and TEAD4.

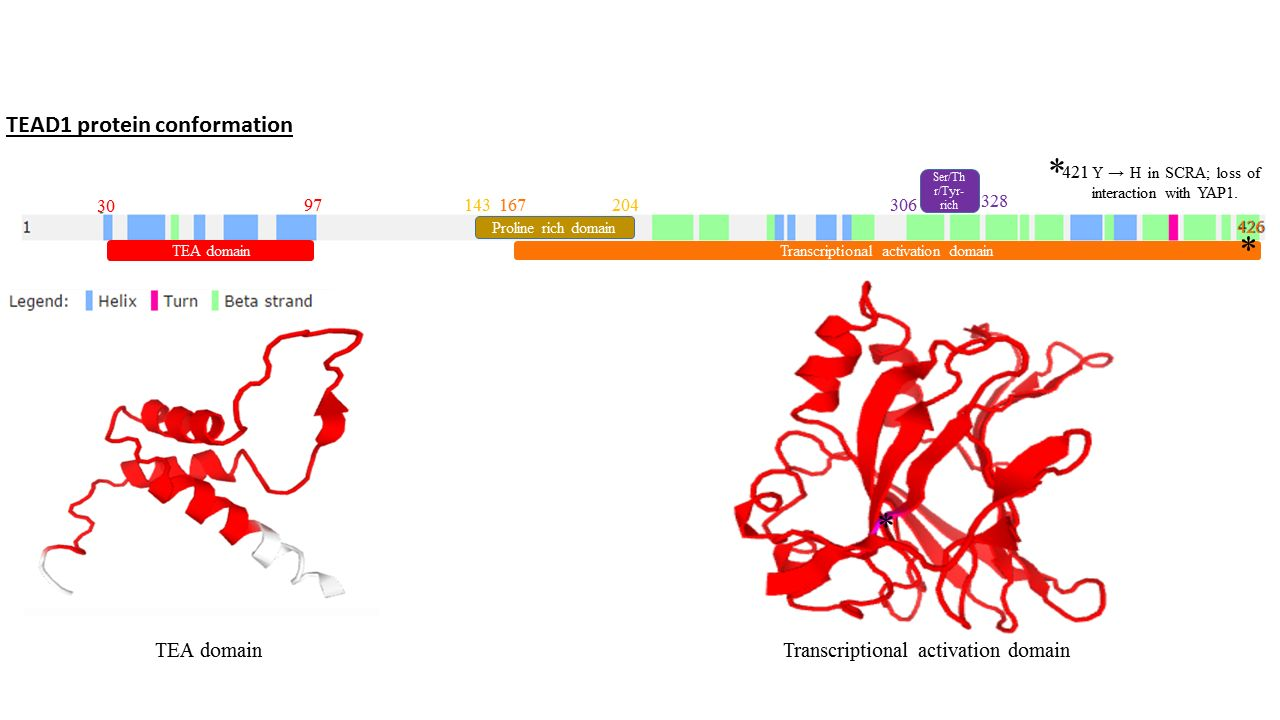

== Structure ==
All members of the TEAD family share a highly conserved DNA binding domain called the TEA domain. This DNA binding domain has a consensus DNA sequence 5'-CATTCCA/T-3' that is called the MCAT element. The three dimensional structure of the TEA domain has been identified. Its conformation is close to that of the homeodomain and contains 3 α helixes (H1, H2 and H3). It is the H3 helix that enables TEAD proteins to bind DNA.

Another conserved domain of TEAD1 is located at the C terminus of the protein. It allows the binding of cofactors and has been called the YAP1 binding domain, because it is its ability to bind this well-known TEAD proteins co-factor that led to its identification. Indeed, TEAD proteins cannot induce gene expression on their own. They have to associate with cofactors to be able to act

== Tissue distribution ==
TEAD1 is expressed in various tissues including skeletal muscle, pancreas, placenta, lung, and heart.

== Orthologs ==
TEAD proteins are found in many organisms under different names, assuming different functions. For example, in Saccharomyces cerevisiae TEC-1 regulates the transposable element TY1 and is involved in pseudohyphale growth (the elongated shape that yeasts take when grown in nutrient-poor conditions). In Aspergillus nidulans, the TEA domain protein abaA regulates the differentiation of conidiophores. In Drosophila the transcription factor Scalloped is involved in the development of the wing disc, survival and cell growth. Finally in Xenopus it has been demonstrated that the ortholog of TEAD1 regulates muscle differentiation.

== Function ==
- Heart development (myocardium differentiation,
- Skeletal muscle development (alpha-actin of skeletal muscles),)
- Smooth muscle development (alpha-actin of smooth muscles),
- Regulation of myosin heavy chain genes, cardiac muscular genes troponin T and I
- Regulation of proliferation,
- Regulation of apoptosis,

== Post-transcriptional modifications ==
Protein Kinase A (pKA) can phosphorylate TEAD1 at serine 102, after the TEA domain. This phosphorylation is needed for the transcriptional activation of the α MyHC gene. Protein Kinase C (pKC) phosphorylates TEAD1 on serine and threonine next to the last alpha loop in the TEA domain. This phosphorylation decreases TEAD1 binding to the GTIIC enhancer. TEAD1 can be palmitoylated on a conserved cysteine at the C-term of the protein. This post-translational modification is critical for proper folding of TEAD proteins and their stability.

== Cofactors ==
TEAD proteins require cofactors to induce the transcription of target genes. TEAD1 interacts with all members of the SRC family of steroid receptor coactivators. In HeLa cells TEAD1 and SRC induce gene expression, TEAD1 interacts with PARP (poly (ADP-ribose) polymerase) to regulate smooth muscle α-actin expression. PARP can also ADP-ribosylate the TEAD proteins and make the chromatin context favorable to transcription through histone modification, SRF (Serum response factor) and TEAD1 together regulate gene expression.

TEAD proteins and MEF2 (myocyte enhancer factor 2) interact physically. The binding of MEF2 on DNA induces and potentiates TEAD1 recruitment at MCAT sequences that are adjacent to MEF2 binding sites. This recruitment leads to the repression of the MLC2v (Myosin Light Chain 2 v) and βMHC ( β-myosin heavy chain ) promoter. TEAD1 and the phosphoprotein MAX interact in vivo and in vitro. Once this complex is formed, these two proteins can regulate the alpha-myosin heavy chain (α-MHC) gene expression.

The four Vestigial-like (VGLL) proteins are able to interact with all TEADs. The precise function of TEAD and VGLL interaction is still poorly understood. It has been shown that TEAD/VGLL1 complexes promote anchorage-independent cell proliferation in prostate cancer cell lines suggesting a role in cancer progression Moreover, VGLL2 interaction with TEAD1 activates muscle promoter upon C2C12 differentiation and enhances MyoD-mediated myogenic in 10T1/2. Finally the complex TEAD/VGLL4 acts as a default transcriptional repressor.

The interaction between YAP (Yes Associated Protein 65), TAZ, a transcriptional coactivator paralog to YAP, and all TEAD proteins was demonstrated both in vitro and in vivo. In both cases the interaction of the proteins leads to increased TEAD transcriptional activity. YAP/TAZ are effectors of the Hippo tumor suppressor pathway that restricts organ growth by keeping in check cell proliferation and promoting apoptosis in mammals and also in Drosophila.

== Role in cancer ==
Analysis of cancer transcriptome databases (www.ebi.ac.uk/gxa) showed that TEAD1 is dysregulated in several types of cancers. First in Kaposi sarcoma there is a 300-fold increase in TEAD1 levels. Moreover, the increase of TEAD expression can be detected in basal-like breast cancers, fallopian tube carcinoma, and germ cell tumors. Otherwise, in other types of cancer TEAD expression is decreased, for example in other breast cancer types and in renal or bladder cancers. This dual role can be explained by the different targets and the differential regulation of target genes by TEAD transcription factors. Finally recent studies showed that TEAD1 and YAP in ovarian cancer can induces cell stemness and chemoresistance. and that genetic variant of TEAD protein and YAP are enriched in some cancers.
