= FJX1 =

Protein-coding gene in the species Homo sapiens

Identifiers
- Aliases: FJX1, four jointed box 1, four-jointed box kinase 1
- External IDs: OMIM: 612206; MGI: 1341907; HomoloGene: 7717; GeneCards: FJX1; OMA:FJX1 - orthologs

Gene location (Human)
Chr.	Chromosome 11 (human)
Band	11p13	Start	35,618,460 bp
Band	11p13	End	35,620,865 bp

Gene location (Mouse)
Chr.	Chromosome 2 (mouse)
Band	2|2 E2	Start	102,279,711 bp
Band	2|2 E2	End	102,282,844 bp
RNA expression pattern
Bgee	Human / Mouse (ortholog); Top expressed in: ventricular zone; ganglionic eminence; Brodmann area 23; testicle; gonad; middle temporal gyrus; gingival epithelium; anterior cingulate cortex; stromal cell of endometrium; nucleus accumbens / Top expressed in: subiculum; lumbar subsegment of spinal cord; molar; olfactory bulb; olfactory tubercle; medial geniculate nucleus; prefrontal cortex; anterior amygdaloid area; corneal stroma; medial dorsal nucleus; More reference expression data
BioGPS	n/a
Orthologs
Species	Human	Mouse
Entrez	24147	14221
Ensembl	ENSG00000179431	ENSMUSG00000075012
UniProt	Q86VR8	Q8BQB4
RefSeq (mRNA)	NM_014344	NM_010218
RefSeq (protein)	NP_055159	NP_034348
Location (UCSC)	Chr 11: 35.62 – 35.62 Mb	Chr 2: 102.28 – 102.28 Mb
PubMed search
- Wikidata
View/Edit Human	View/Edit Mouse

Four jointed box 1 is a protein that in humans is encoded by the FJX1 gene.

== Function ==
The protein encoded by this gene is the human ortholog of mouse and Drosophila four-jointed gene product. The Drosophila protein is important for growth and differentiation of legs and wings, and for proper development of the eyes. The exact function of this gene in humans is not known.
