= Bare lymphocyte syndrome type II =

- Other names: HLA class 2-negative severe combined immunodeficiency, HLA Class 2-Negative
- Bare lymphocyte syndrome 2 is autosomal recessive in inheritance
- Specialty: Immunology, pediatrics, endocrinology
- Symptoms: Neutropenia
- Causes: Absence of human leukocyte antigen class II expression
- Diagnostic method: Genetic test
- Medication: Bone marrow transplant

Bare lymphocyte syndrome type II (BLS II) is a rare recessive genetic condition in which a group of genes called major histocompatibility complex class II (MHC class II) are not expressed.

== Symptoms and signs ==
Among the signs and symptoms that Bare lymphocyte syndrome type II exhibits are the following:

- Chronic mucocutaneous candidiasis
- Colitis
- Recurrent bacterial infections
- Encephalitis
- Neutropenia
- Diarrhea
- Hepatitis(viral)
- Growth abnormality

== Cause ==
The genetic cause of Bare lymphocyte syndrome type II is due to mutations in any of the following genes:

- CIITA is responsible for giving instructions to create a protein that controls transcription of genes (MHC class II), and is located at 16p13.13 (cytogenetic location),
- RFX5 has the same function(as prior gene) and is located at 1q21.3(cytogenetic location)
- RFXANK(also known as ankyrin repeat-containing regulatory factor X-associated protein) has the same function(as the other genes) and is located at 19p13.11(cytogenetic location)
- RFXAP gives information to create RFX associated protein, which also is involved in transcription of MHC class II genes, and is located at 13q13.3,(cytogenetic location)

== Mechanism ==
MHC Class 2

Major histocompatibility complex class II proteins are important because under normal function they have important responsibility in the human body's immune system response. MHC II proteins present exogenous antigens that activate CD4+ T-lymphocytes, immune cells that are responsible for activating other immune cells like CD8+ T-lymphocytes and macrophages. MHC II proteins are also important for positive and negative selection in the thymus because they present antigens to immature T-cells, allowing the T cells to differentiate into proper functioning CD4+ T-lymphocytes. This may explain why patients with BLS II display decreased levels of CD4+ T-lymphocytes in their blood.

The basis for BLSII is not due to defects in the MHC II genes themselves, it is the result of mutations in genes that code for proteins, transcription factors that normally regulate the expression of the MHC II genes. One of the several proteins that are required to switch on MHC II genes in various cell types is absent.

== Diagnosis ==
The diagnosis for Bare lymphocyte syndrome type II can be done via genetic testing A blood test could indicate decreased CD4+ T-cells(T-helper lymphocyte), as well as serum immunoglobulin

== Management ==
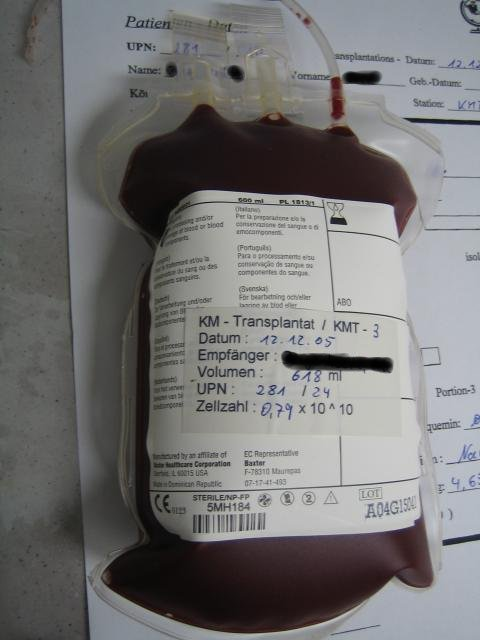
Bone marrow

In terms of treatment for major histocompatibility complex class II deficiency(Bare lymphocyte syndrome type II), one finds that according to Matheux, et al. a possible treatment for this condition might be found in cellular and gene therapy The prognosis is poor (without treatment) in early childhood for this condition; additional treatment options include anti-microbial prophylaxis prior to bone marrow transplant

== See also ==
- Bare lymphocyte syndrome
