= GLIS1 =

Protein-coding gene

Identifiers
- Aliases: GLIS1, GLIS family zinc finger 1
- External IDs: OMIM: 610378; MGI: 2386723; GeneCards: GLIS1

Gene location (Human)
Chr.	Chromosome 1 (human)
Band	1p32.3	Start	53,506,237 bp
Band	1p32.3	End	53,739,164 bp

Gene location (Mouse)
Chr.	Chromosome 4 (mouse)
Band	4|4 C7	Start	107,291,788 bp
Band	4|4 C7	End	107,492,258 bp
RNA expression pattern
Bgee	Human / Mouse (ortholog); Top expressed in: stromal cell of endometrium; seminal vesicula; prostate; canal of the cervix; testicle; primary visual cortex; right hemisphere of cerebellum; retinal pigment epithelium; ectocervix; gastric mucosa / Top expressed in: zygote; secondary oocyte; right kidney; primary oocyte; gastrula; labioscrotal swelling; proximal tubule; female urethra; morula; male urethra; More reference expression data
BioGPS	n/a
Gene ontology
Molecular function	DNA-binding transcription activator activity, RNA polymerase II-specific; DNA binding; RNA polymerase II transcription regulatory region sequence-specific DNA binding; DNA-binding transcription repressor activity, RNA polymerase II-specific; metal ion binding; nucleic acid binding; DNA-binding transcription factor activity, RNA polymerase II-specific
Cellular component	nucleus
Biological process	regulation of transcription by RNA polymerase II; positive regulation of transcription, DNA-templated; regulation of transcription, DNA-templated; negative regulation of transcription by RNA polymerase II; positive regulation of transcription by RNA polymerase II; transcription, DNA-templated; transcription by RNA polymerase II; osteoblast differentiation; negative regulation of cell fate commitment; fat cell differentiation; cell differentiation
Sources:Amigo / QuickGO
Orthologs
Databases	NCBI: entry; OMA: entry
Species	Human	Mouse
Entrez	148979	230587
Ensembl	ENSG00000174332	ENSMUSG00000034762
UniProt	Q8NBF1	Q8K1M4
RefSeq (mRNA)	NM_147193; NM_001367484; NM_001390836; NM_001390837; NM_001390838	NM_147221
RefSeq (protein)	NP_671726; NP_001354413	NP_671754
Location (UCSC)	Chr 1: 53.51 – 53.74 Mb	Chr 4: 107.29 – 107.49 Mb
PubMed search
- Wikidata
View/Edit Human	View/Edit Mouse

Zinc finger protein GLIS1, also called GLI-similar 1, is a protein that in humans is encoded by the gene GLIS1. GLIS1 is a Krüppel-like protein. The gene is enriched in unfertilised eggs and embryos at the one cell stage and it can be used to promote direct reprogramming of somatic cells to induced pluripotent stem cells, also known as iPS cells. Glis1 is a highly promiscuous transcription factor, regulating the expression of numerous genes, either positively or negatively. In organisms, Glis1 does not appear to have any directly important functions. Mice whose Glis1 gene has been removed have no noticeable change to their phenotype.

== Structure ==
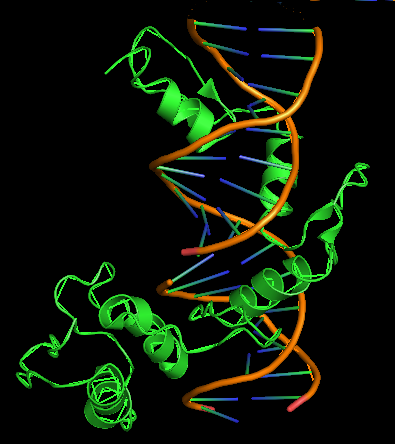
The zinc finger domain of Gli1 in complex with DNA. The third, fourth and fifth zinc fingers of Gli1 are over 80% homologous to the zinc finger domain in Glis1, with fingers four and five making the most intimate interactions with DNA.

Glis1 is an 84.3 kDa proline rich protein composed of 789 amino acids. No crystal structure has yet been determined for Glis1, however it is homologous to other proteins in many parts of its amino acid sequence whose structures have been solved.

=== Zinc finger domain ===
Glis1 uses a Zinc finger domain comprising five tandem Cys_{2}His_{2} zinc finger motifs (meaning the zinc atom is coordinated by two cysteine and two histidine residues) to interact with target DNA sequences to regulate gene transcription. The domain interacts sequence specifically with the DNA, following the major groove along the double helix. It has the consensus sequence GACCACCCAC. The individual zinc finger motifs are separated from one another by the amino acid sequence(T/S)GEKP(Y/F)X, where X can be any amino acid and (A/B) can be either A or B. This domain is homologous to the zinc finger domain found in Gli1 and so is thought to interact with DNA in the same way. The alpha helices of the fourth and fifth zinc fingers are inserted into the major groove and make the most extensive contact of all the zinc fingers with the DNA. Very few contact are made by the second and third fingers and the first finger does not contact the DNA at all. The first finger does make numerous protein-protein interactions with the second zinc finger, however.

=== Termini ===
Glis1 has an activation domain at its C-terminus and a repressive domain at its N-terminus. The repressive domain is much stronger than the activation domain meaning transcription is weak. The activation domain of Glis1 is four times stronger in the presence of CaM kinase IV. This may be due to a coactivator. A proline-rich region of the protein is also found towards the N-terminal. The protein's termini are fairly unusual, and have no strong sequence similarity other proteins.

== Use in cell reprogramming ==
Glis1 can be used as one of the four factors used in reprogramming somatic cells to induced pluripotent stem cells. The three transcription factors Oct3/4, Sox2 and Klf4 are essential for reprogramming but are extremely inefficient on their own, fully reprogramming roughly only 0.005% of the number of cells treated with the factors. When Glis1 is introduced with these three factors, the efficiency of reprogramming is massively increased, producing many more fully reprogrammed cells. The transcription factor c-Myc can also be used as the fourth factor and was the original fourth factor used by Shinya Yamanaka who received the 2012 Nobel Prize in Physiology or Medicine for his work in the conversion of somatic cells to iPS cells. Yamanaka's work allows a way of bypassing the controversy surrounding stem cells.

=== Mechanism ===
Somatic cells are most often fully differentiated in order to perform a specific function, and therefore only express the genes required to perform their function. This means the genes that are required for differentiation to other types of cell are packaged within chromatin structures, so that they are not expressed.

Glis1 reprograms cells by promoting multiple pro-reprogramming pathways. These pathways are activated due to the up regulation of the transcription factors N-Myc, Mycl1, c-Myc, Nanog, ESRRB, FOXA2, GATA4, NKX2-5, as well as the other three factors used for reprogramming. Glis1 also up-regulates expression of the protein LIN28 which binds the let-7 microRNA precursor, preventing production of active let-7. Let-7 microRNAs reduce the expression of pro-reprogramming genes via RNA interference. Glis1 is also able to directly associate with the other three reprogramming factors which may help their function.

The result of the various changes in gene expression is the conversion of heterochromatin, which is very difficult to access, to euchromatin, which can be easily accessed by transcriptional proteins and enzymes such as RNA polymerase. During reprogramming, histones, which make up nucleosomes, the complexes used to package DNA, are generally demethylated and acetylated 'unpacking' the DNA by neutralising the positive charge of the lysine residues on the N-termini of histones.

=== Advantages over c-myc ===
Glis1 has a number of extremely important advantages over c-myc in cell reprogramming.

- No risk of cancer: Although c-myc enhances the efficiency of reprogramming, its major disadvantage is that it is a proto-oncogene meaning the iPS cells produced using c-myc are much more likely to become cancerous. This is an enormous obstacle between iPS cells and their use in medicine. When Glis1 is used in cell reprogramming, there is no increased risk of cancer development.
- Production of fewer 'bad' colonies: While c-myc promotes the proliferation of reprogrammed cells, it also promotes the proliferation of 'bad' cells which have not reprogrammed properly and make up the vast majority of cells in a dish of treated cells. Glis1 actively suppresses the proliferation of cells that have not fully reprogrammed, making the selection and harvesting of the properly reprogrammed cells less laborious. This is likely to be due to many of these 'bad' cells expressing Glis1 but not all four of the reprogramming factors. When expressed on its own, Glis1 inhibits proliferation.
- More efficient reprogramming: The use of Glis1 reportedly produces more fully reprogrammed iPS cells than c-myc. This is an important quality given the inefficiency of reprogramming.

=== Disadvantages ===
- Inhibition of Proliferation: Failure to stop Glis1 expression after reprogramming inhibits cell proliferation and ultimately leads to the death of the reprogrammed cell. Therefore, careful regulation of Glis1 expression is required. This explains why Glis1 expression is switched off in embryos after they have started to divide.

== Roles in disease ==
Glis1 has been implicated to play a part in a number of diseases and disorders.

=== Psoriasis ===
Glis1 has been shown to be heavily up regulated in psoriasis, a disease which causes chronic inflammation of the skin. Normally, Glis1 is not expressed in the skin at all. However, during inflammation, it is expressed in the spinous layer of the skin, the second layer from the bottom of four layers as a response to the inflammation. This is the last layer where the cells have nuclei and thus the last layer where gene expression occurs. It is believed that the role of Glis1 in this disease is to promote cell differentiation in the skin by changing the increasing the expression of multiple pro-differentation genes such as IGFBP2 which inhibits proliferation and can also promote apoptosis It also decreases the expression of Jagged1, a ligand of notch in the notch signaling pathway and Frizzled10, a receptor in the wnt signaling pathway.

=== Late onset Parkinson's Disease ===
A certain allele of Glis1 which exists due to a single nucleotide polymorphism, a change in a single nucleotide of the DNA sequence of the gene, has been implicated as a risk factor in the neurodegenerative disorder Parkinson's disease. The allele is linked to the late onset variety of Parkinson's, which is acquired in old age. The reason behind this link is not yet known.
