= Bare lymphocyte syndrome =

- Bare lymphocyte syndrome is autosomal recessive in inheritance
- Specialty: Hematology

Bare lymphocyte syndrome (BLS) is a condition caused by mutations in certain genes of the major histocompatibility complex or involved with the processing and presentation of MHC molecules. It is a form of severe combined immunodeficiency.

== Presentation ==
Bare lymphocyte syndrome, type II (BLS II) is a rare recessive genetic condition in which a group of genes called the major histocompatibility complex class II (MHC class II) are not expressed.

In BLS II the immune system is severely compromised and cannot effectively fight infection due to an inability for antigen presenting cells to activate CD4⁺ t-cells as no TCR recognition of MHC II/peptide complexes can occur. Clinically, this is similar to severe combined immunodeficiency (SCID), in which lymphocyte precursor cells are improperly formed. Absolute T-cell count is also reduced, due to impaired development with the absence of MHC II.

BLS I is characterised by a lack of MHC I molecules. Symptoms can include recurrent bacterial infections of the respiratory tract and chronic skin lesions. Bronchiectasis, respiratory failure and tissue erosion of the nose and cerebral abscess are severe complications. Lack of MHC I expression on cell membranes causes self-immunity in NK and γδ T lymphocytes which are otherwhise downregulated by presence of MHC I.

Diarrhea can be among the associated conditions.

== Genetics ==
=== BLS II ===
The genetic basis for BLSII is not due to defects in the MHC II genes themselves. The genetic basis is the result of mutations in genes that code for proteins (transcription factors) that regulate the expression (gene transcription) of the MHC II genes. That is, one of the several proteins that are required to switch on MHC II genes is absent. The genes responsible were cloned by the laboratories of Bernard Mach in Switzerland and Jeremy Boss at Emory University in Atlanta, Georgia.

Mutation in any one of four genes can lead to BLS II. The genes' names are:

- class II trans-activator (CIITA)
- regulatory factor X5 (RFX5)
- RFX-associated protein (RFXAP)
- RFX ankyrin repeats (RFXANK; also known as RFXB)

=== BLS I ===
The comparatively rarer BLS I, also called "HLA class I deficiency" is associated with TAP2, TAP1, or TAPBP deficiencies. TAP (Transporter associated with antigen processing) proteins are involved in pumping degraded cytosolic peptides across the endoplasmic reticulum membrane so they can bind to HLA class I. Once the peptide:HLA class I complex forms, it is transported to the membrane of the cell. However, a defect in the TAP proteins prevents pumping of peptides into the endoplasmic reticulum so no peptide:HLA class I complexes form and therefore no HLA class I is expressed on the membrane.

== Diagnosis ==
=== Classification ===
- Type 1: MHC class I
- Type 2: MHC class II
