= Let-7 microRNA family =

let-7 microRNA precursor
- Predicted secondary structure and sequence conservation of let-7

Identifiers
- Symbol: let-7
- Rfam: RF00027
- miRBase: MI0000001
- miRBase family: MIPF0000002

Other data
- RNA type: Gene; miRNA
- Domain: Eukaryota
- GO: GO:0035195 GO:0035068
- SO: SO:0001244
- PDB structures: PDBe

The Let-7 microRNA precursor gives rise to let-7, a microRNA (miRNA) involved in control of stem-cell division and differentiation. let-7, short for "lethal-7", was discovered along with the miRNA lin-4 in a study of developmental timing in C. elegans, making these miRNAs the first ever discovered. let-7 was later identified in humans as the first human miRNA, and is highly conserved across many species. Dysregulation of let-7 contributes to cancer development in humans by preventing differentiation of cells, leaving them stuck in a stem-cell like state. let-7 is therefore classified as a tumor suppressor.

The let-7 microRNA family refers to the many slight variations of let-7 that exist both within a single organism and across species. In humans, for example, there are ten unique let-7 family member sequences: let-7a through g, let-7i, mir-98, and mir-202.

In humans, mature let-7 acts via RNA-induced silencing by complexing with RISC and binding to target mRNA, preventing translation into protein. Known targets of let-7 include proteins related to the cell cycle and proliferation, such as MYC, RAS, cyclin D, HMGA2, and CDC25A. Knockdown of these proteins by let-7 prevents proliferation and induces differentiation of cells. Important inhibitors of let-7 include LIN28, which binds to let-7 directly, and the proto-oncogene MYC, which suppresses expression.

== Genomic locations ==
In the human genome, the cluster let-7a-1/let-7f-1/let-7d is inside the region B at 9q22.3, with the defining marker D9S280-D9S1809. One minimal LOH (loss of heterozygosity) region, between loci D11S1345 and D11S1316, contains the cluster miR-125b1/let-7a-2/miR-100. The cluster miR-99a/let-7c/miR-125b-2 is in a 21p11.1 region of HD (homozygous deletions). The cluster let-7g/miR-135-1 is in region 3 at 3p21.1–p21.2.

== The let-7 family ==
The lethal-7 (let-7) gene was first discovered in the nematode C. elegans as a key developmental regulator and became one of the first two known microRNAs (the other one is lin-4). Soon, let-7 was found in the fruit fly (Drosophila), and identified as the first known human miRNA by a BLAST (basic local alignment search tool) research. The mature form of let-7 family members is highly conserved across species.

=== In C. elegans ===
In C. elegans, the let-7 family consists of genes encoding nine miRNAs sharing the same seed sequence. Among them, let-7, mir-84, mir-48 and mir-241 are involved in the C. elegans heterochronic pathway, sequentially controlling developmental timing of larva transitions. Most animals with loss-of-function let-7 mutation burst through their vulvas and die, and therefore the mutant is lethal (let). The mutants of other let-7 family members have a radio-resistant phenotype in vulval cells, which may be related to their ability to repress RAS.

=== In Drosophila ===
There is only one single let-7 gene in the Drosophila genome, which has the identical mature sequence to the one in C. elegans. The role of let-7 has been demonstrated in regulating the timing of neuromuscular junction formation in the abdomen and cell-cycle in the wing. Furthermore, the expression of pri-, pre- and mature let-7 have the same rhythmic pattern with the hormone pulse before each cuticular molt in Drosophila.

=== In vertebrates ===
The let-7 family has a lot more members in vertebrates than in C. elegans and Drosophila. The sequences, expression timing, as well as genomic clustering of these miRNAs members are all conserved across species. The direct role of let-7 family in vertebrate development has not been clearly shown as in less complex organisms, yet the expression pattern of let-7 family is indeed temporally regulated during developmental processes. Functionally, let-7 has been shown in early vertebrates to control the differentiation of mesoderm and ectoderm. Given that the expression levels of let-7 members are significantly low in human cancers and cancer stem cells, the major function of let-7 genes may be to promote terminal differentiation in development and tumor suppression.

== Regulation of expression ==
Although the levels of mature let-7 members are undetectable in undifferentiated cells, the primary transcripts and the hairpin precursors of let-7 are present in these cells. It indicates that the mature let-7 miRNAs may be regulated in a post-transcriptional manner.

=== By pluripotency promoting factor LIN28 ===
As one of the genes involved in (but not essential for) induced pluripotent stem (iPS) cell reprogramming, LIN28 expression is reciprocal to that of mature let-7. LIN28 selectively binds the primary and precursor forms of let-7, and inhibits the processing of pri-let-7 to form the hairpin precursor. This binding is facilitated by the conserved loop sequence of primary let-7 family members and RNA-binding domains of LIN28 proteins. Lin-28 uses two zinc knuckle domains to recognize the NGNNG motif in the let-7 precursors, while the Cold-shock domain, connected by a flexible linker, binds to a closed loop in the precursors. On the other hand, let-7 miRNAs in mammals have been shown to regulate LIN28, which implies that let-7 might enhance its own level by repressing LIN28, its negative regulator.

=== In autoregulatory loop with MYC ===
Expression of let-7 members is controlled by MYC binding to their promoters. The levels of let-7 have been reported to decrease in models of MYC-mediated tumorigenesis, and to increase when MYC is inhibited by chemicals. In a twist, there are let-7-binding sites in MYC 3' untranslated region(UTR) according to bioinformatic analysis, and let-7 overexpression in cell culture decreased MYC mRNA levels. Therefore, there is a double-negative feedback loop between MYC and let-7. Furthermore, let-7 could lead to IMP1 (insulin-like growth factor II mRNA-binding protein) depletion, which destabilizes MYC mRNA, thus forming an indirect regulatory pathway.

== Targets of let-7 ==
=== Oncogenes: RAS, HMGA2 ===
Let-7 has been demonstrated to be a direct regulator of RAS expression in human cells All the three RAS genes in human, K-, N-, and H-, have the predicted let-7 binding sequences in their 3'UTRs. In lung cancer patient samples, expression of RAS and let-7 showed reciprocal pattern, which has low let-7 and high RAS in cancerous cells, and high let-7 and low RAS in normal cells. Another oncogene, high mobility group A2 (HMGA2), has also been identified as a target of let-7. Let-7 directly inhibits HMGA2 by binding to its 3'UTR. Removal of let-7 binding site by 3'UTR deletion cause overexpression of HMGA2 and formation of tumor.

=== Cell cycle, proliferation, and apoptosis regulators ===
Microarray analyses revealed many genes regulating cell cycle and cell proliferation that are responsive to alteration of let-7 levels, including cyclin A2, CDC34, Aurora A and B kinases (STK6 and STK12), E2F5, and CDK8, among others. Subsequent experiments confirmed the direct effects of some of these genes, such as CDC25A and CDK6. Let-7 also inhibits several components of DNA replication machinery, transcription factors, even some tumor suppressor genes and checkpoint regulators. Apoptosis is regulated by let-7 as well, through Casp3, Bcl2, Map3k1 and Cdk5 modulation.

=== Immunity ===
Let-7 has been implicated in post-transcriptional control of innate immune responses to pathogenic agents. Macrophages stimulated with live bacteria or purified microbial components down-regulate the expression of several members of the let-7 microRNA family to relieve repression of immune-modulatory cytokines IL-6 and IL-10. Let-7 has also been implicated in the negative regulation of TLR4, the major immune receptor of microbial lipopolysaccharide and down-regulation of let-7 both upon microbial and protozoan infection might elevate TLR4 signaling and expression. Let-7 has furthermore been reported to regulate the production of cytokine IL-13 by T lymphocytes during allergic airway inflammation thus linking this microRNA to adaptive immunity as well. Down-modulation of let-7 negative regulator Lin28b in human T lymphocytes is believed to accrue during early neonate development to reprogram the immune system towards defense.

== Potential clinical use in cancer ==
Given the prominent phenotype of cell overproliferation and dedifferentiation by let-7 loss-of-function in nematodes, and the role of its targets on cell destiny determination, let-7 is closely associated with human cancer and acts as a tumor suppressor.

=== Prognostic Biomarkers ===
Numerous reports have shown that the expression levels of let-7 are frequently low and the chromosomal clusters of let-7 are often deleted in many cancers. Let-7 is expressed at higher levels in more differentiated tumors, which also have lower levels of activated oncogenes such as RAS and HMGA2. Therefore, expression levels of let-7 could be prognostic markers in several cancers associated with differentiation stages. In lung cancer, for example, reduced expression of let-7 is significantly correlated with reduced postoperative survival. The expression of let-7b and let-7g microRNAs are significantly associated with overall survival in 1262 breast cancer patients.

=== Therapy ===
Let-7 is also a very attractive potential therapeutic that can prevent tumorigenesis and angiogenesis, typically in cancers that underexpress let-7. Lung cancer, for instance, has several key oncogenic mutations including p53, RAS and MYC, some of which may directly correlate with the reduced expression of let-7, and may be repressed by introduction of let-7. Intranasal administration of let-7 has already been found effective in reducing tumor growth in a transgenic mouse model of lung cancer. Similar restoration of let-7 was also shown to inhibit cell proliferation in breast, colon and hepatic cancers, lymphoma, and uterine leiomyoma.
