= Natural healing =

Natural healing may refer to:

== Biology ==
- Healing, the natural process of regeneration of damaged tissue

== Pseudoscience ==
- Vitalism
- Naturopathy (also known as Naturopathic medicine)
