= LIN28B =

Protein-coding gene in the species Homo sapiens

Identifiers
- Aliases: LIN28B, CSDD2, lin-28 homolog B
- External IDs: OMIM: 611044; MGI: 3584032; GeneCards: LIN28B
Available structures
PDB	Ortholog search: PDBe RCSB
PDB	List of PDB id codes 4A4I

Gene location (Human)
Chr.	Chromosome 6 (human)
Band	6q16.3-q21	Start	104,936,616 bp
Band	6q16.3-q21	End	105,083,332 bp

Gene location (Mouse)
Chr.	Chromosome 10 (mouse)
Band	10|10 B2	Start	45,252,716 bp
Band	10|10 B2	End	45,362,491 bp
RNA expression pattern
Bgee	Human / Mouse (ortholog); Top expressed in: placenta; buccal mucosa cell; gonad; testicle; secondary oocyte; sperm; decidua; Brodmann area 23; right testis; left testis / Top expressed in: tail of embryo; zygote; secondary oocyte; embryo; embryo; primary oocyte; genital tubercle; spermatocyte; epiblast; morula; More reference expression data
BioGPS	n/a
Gene ontology
Molecular function	DNA binding; zinc ion binding; protein binding; metal ion binding; RNA binding; nucleic acid binding
Cellular component	cytoplasm; nucleus; nucleolus; cytosol
Biological process	pre-miRNA processing; miRNA catabolic process; gene silencing; regulation of transcription, DNA-templated; RNA 3'-end processing
Sources:Amigo / QuickGO
Orthologs
Databases	NCBI: entry; OMA: entry
Species	Human	Mouse
Entrez	389421	380669
Ensembl	ENSG00000187772	ENSMUSG00000063804
UniProt	Q6ZN17	Q45KJ6
RefSeq (mRNA)	NM_001004317	NM_001031772; NM_001033152
RefSeq (protein)	NP_001004317	NP_001026942
Location (UCSC)	Chr 6: 104.94 – 105.08 Mb	Chr 10: 45.25 – 45.36 Mb
PubMed search
- Wikidata
View/Edit Human	View/Edit Mouse

Lin-28 homolog B is a protein that in humans is encoded by the LIN28B gene. Lin28 is a gene found in both invertebrates and vertebrates, from worms to humans, where it regulates the timing of development from fertilization to adulthood.

== Evolution ==
Lin28B can be traced to a mutational event that occurred around 300 million years ago during which a large section of a heterochronic gene, Lin28, now referred to as Lin28A, was duplicated resulting in the appearance of a paralog, Lin28B.

== Structure ==
The protein encoded by this gene belongs to the lin-28 family, which is characterized by the presence of a cold-shock domain and a pair of CCHC zinc finger domains.

== Tissue distribution ==
This gene is highly expressed in testis, fetal liver, placenta, and in primary human tumors and cancer cell lines.

== Function ==
LIN28B is an evolutionarily conserved RNA-binding protein primarily known for its role in regulating the maturation of let-7 microRNAs, which are important for cell differentiation and development. During embryogenesis and in stem cells, LIN28B blocks differentiation and promotes cell proliferation by inhibiting let-7 biogenesis, thereby preventing the accumulation of these tumor-suppressive miRNAs. Mechanistically, the N-terminal cold-shock domain (CSD) and the C-terminal zinc-knuckle domain (ZKD) of LIN28B allow for stepwise binding to immature let-7 pre-miRNAs, triggering their remodeling and subsequent uridylation and degradation, effectively silencing their functions.

developmental timing, pluripotency, and tumorigenesis, chiefly by controlling miRNA biogenesis and acting as an RNA-binding protein, but it also possesses let-7–independent roles in direct gene regulation and cellular metabolism.

== Clinical significance ==
It is negatively regulated by microRNAs that target sites in the 3' UTR, and overexpression of this gene in primary tumors is linked to the repression of let-7 family of microRNAs and derepression of let-7 targets, which facilitates cellular transformation.

Even minor changes in Lin28 are known to alter the timing of developmental stages and thereby affect all features that emerge during those stages. The duplication shifted the developmental clock backward, such that mammals carrying both Lin28A and Lin28B gave birth earlier in gestation. As a result, mammalian offspring were born less developed, requiring greater maternal investment. This innovation marked the appearance of mammals and accounts for two of their distinguishing features compared to reptiles and amphibians: altricial young and increased maternal bonding.
