= IPSCS =

IPSCS or iPSCs may refer to

1. Closed-circuit_television#IP_cameras
2. Induced pluripotent stem cell
