= Tetraploid complementation assay =

Technique in biology

The tetraploid complementation assay is a technique in biology in which cells of two mammalian embryos are combined to form a new embryo. It is used to construct genetically modified organisms, to study the consequences of certain mutations on embryonal development, and in the study of pluripotent stem cells. The first demonstration that induced pluripotent stem cells (iPSCs) could generate viable mice through tetraploid complementation was reported in 2009, providing strong functional evidence that iPSCs can be equivalent to embryonic stem cells in developmental potential.

== Procedure ==
Normal mammalian somatic cells are diploid: each chromosome (and thus every gene) is present in duplicate (excluding genes from X chromosome absent in Y chromosome). The assay starts with producing a tetraploid cell in which every chromosome exists fourfold. This is done by taking an embryo at the two-cell stage and fusing the two cells by applying an electrical current. The resulting tetraploid cell will continue to divide, and all daughter cells will also be tetraploid.

Such a tetraploid embryo can develop normally to the blastocyst stage and will implant in the wall of the uterus. The tetraploid cells can form the extra-embryonic tissue (placenta, etc.); however, a proper fetus will rarely develop.

In the tetraploid complementation assay, one now combines such a tetraploid embryo (either at the morula or blastocyst stage) with normal diploid embryonic stem cells (ES) from a different organism. The embryo will then develop normally; the fetus is exclusively derived from the ES cell, while the extra-embryonic tissues are exclusively derived from the tetraploid cells.

== Applications ==
Tetraploid complementation is often described as one of the most stringent functional tests of pluripotency in mammals, because it can show whether pluripotent stem cells are able to generate the embryo proper when supported by tetraploid extraembryonic tissues.

- Foreign genes or mutations can be introduced into ES cells rather easily, and these ES cells can then be grown into whole animals using the tetraploid complementation assay.
- By introducing targeted mutations into the tetraploid cells and/or into the ES cells, one can study which genes are important for fetal development and which ones are important for development of the extra-embryonic tissues.
- The tetraploid complementation assay is also used to test whether induced pluripotent stem cells (stem cells artificially produced from differentiated cells, e.g. from skin cells) are as competent as normal embryonal stem cells. If a viable animal can be produced from an induced pluripotent stem cell using the tetraploid complementation assay, then the induced stem cells are deemed equivalent to embryonal stem cells. This was first shown in 2009. In humans, tetraploid complementation is not used to assess induced pluripotent stem cell potential due to ethical and legal constraints on characterizing human stem cell lineages using chimeric embryo assays like tetraploid complementation.
- After editing of embryonic stem cells, the tetraploid complementation assay can generate genetically modified mouse lines directly from the modified cell line, bypassing pronuclear or blastocyst microinjection and the several generations of breeding normally required to obtain a pure genetic background.

Although the assay was developed and is most widely used in mice, tetraploid complementation approaches have also been applied in other mammals, including rats, where embryonic stem cells have been used to generate viable animals via tetraploid complementation, demonstrating the broader utility of the assay.

== Limitations and ethical considerations ==
A practical limitation is that success depends heavily on the donor cell line rather than on the procedure itself. iPSC lines generated with the standard OSKM reprogramming cocktail frequently fail to support full-term development in the assay, a failure associated with aberrant hypermethylation at the imprinted Dlk1-Dio3 locus; reprogramming strategies that avoid forced Oct4 overexpression restore developmental potential and increase the proportion of lines that pass the assay. Tetraploid complementation involves generation of chimeric embryos and requires in utero gestation, which poses ethical issues that preclude its use in human pluripotent stem cell research. International stem cell research guidelines emphasize ethical oversight and prohibit manipulation of human embryos using techniques such as tetraploid complementation.
