= Mir-48 =

MRNA precuror family

mir-48 microRNA is a microRNA which is found in nematodes, in which it controls developmental timing. It acts in the heterochronic pathway, where it controls the timing of cell fate decisions in the vulva and hypodermis during larval development.

== Gene structure and location ==
Along with mir-241, mir-48 is found in the lin-58 allele between the genes hum-5 and unc-76. It is related to (at least) three other miRNAs (let-7,mir-84 and mir-241), with which it shares eight identical bases at the 5′ end of the mature miRNA.

== Function ==
mir-48, along with let-7, mir-84 and mir-241, controls developmental timing events in C. elegans proliferative seam cells and hypodermal syncytial cells. Double mutations in mir-48 and mir-214 result in worms displaying a retarded cell lineage phenotype; extra seam cells are observed in the L3 and L4 developmental stages when compared to wild-type worms. It is thought that the extra cells arise due to mutant miRNAs being unable to repress the gene hbl-1, which also plays a role in developmental timing.
