= ZXDC =

Protein-coding gene in the species Homo sapiens

Identifiers
- Aliases: ZXDC, ZXDL, ZXD family zinc finger C
- External IDs: OMIM: 615746; MGI: 1933108; GeneCards: ZXDC

Gene location (Human)
Chr.	Chromosome 3 (human)
Band	3q21.3	Start	126,437,601 bp
Band	3q21.3	End	126,475,891 bp

Gene location (Mouse)
Chr.	Chromosome 6 (mouse)
Band	6 D1|6	Start	90,346,474 bp
Band	6 D1|6	End	90,380,472 bp
RNA expression pattern
Bgee	Human / Mouse (ortholog); Top expressed in: gastrocnemius muscle; right lobe of liver; sural nerve; muscle of thigh; ganglionic eminence; right uterine tube; granulocyte; body of pancreas; left ovary; right ovary / Top expressed in: ascending aorta; aortic valve; granulocyte; placenta; primary oocyte; decidua; secondary oocyte; Gonadal ridge; Paneth cell; retinal pigment epithelium; More reference expression data
BioGPS	n/a
Gene ontology
Molecular function	DNA-binding transcription factor activity; LRR domain binding; C2H2 zinc finger domain binding; protein binding; metal ion binding; nucleic acid binding; DNA-binding transcription factor activity, RNA polymerase II-specific
Cellular component	nucleus; cellular component
Biological process	positive regulation of transcription, DNA-templated; regulation of transcription, DNA-templated; transcription, DNA-templated; regulation of transcription by RNA polymerase II
Sources:Amigo / QuickGO
Orthologs
Databases	NCBI: entry; OMA: entry
Species	Human	Mouse
Entrez	79364	80292
Ensembl	ENSG00000070476	ENSMUSG00000034430
UniProt	Q2QGD7	Q8C8V1
RefSeq (mRNA)	NM_001040653; NM_025112	NM_030260; NM_173002
RefSeq (protein)	NP_001035743; NP_079388	NP_084536; NP_766590
Location (UCSC)	Chr 3: 126.44 – 126.48 Mb	Chr 6: 90.35 – 90.38 Mb
PubMed search
- Wikidata
View/Edit Human	View/Edit Mouse

Zinc finger, X-linked, duplicated family member C (ZXDC) is a human CIITA-binding protein involved in the activation of major histocompatibility complex (MHC) class I and II. For binding to occur, ZXDC must form an oligomeric complex with another copy of itself or with ZXDA, a related protein. ZXDC is activated by sumoylation, a post-translational modification. ZXDC plays a role in controlling immunological responses, cancer formation and progression, and cell proliferation, differentiation, and survival.

== History ==
When Sakaue and colleagues searched for novel transcription factors involved in the development of Xenopus laevis, they discovered ZXDC (ZXD Family Zinc Finger C). This discovery was discovered in a research article that was published in 1998. They found a cDNA clone called "Xfin" that encodes a protein with two zinc finger C2H2 domains.

Later research established the interspecies conservation of the Xfin protein, and the human equivalent was given the name ZXDC. It was discovered that the protein was broadly generated in human tissues and that a number of variables, including hypoxia, estrogen, and cytokines, controlled how the protein was expressed.

== Structure ==
ZXDC is a protein composed of 455 amino acids in humans, with a molecular weight of approximately 49.9 kDa.

Near its C-terminus, the protein has two C2H2-type zinc finger domains that are likely to be involved in DNA binding and transcriptional control. A flexible linker region that separates the zinc fingers may provide more adaptability in binding to various DNA sequences.

Other domains found in ZXDC include a proline-rich region close to the N-terminus that may be important in protein-protein interactions and a central region that is projected to be intrinsically disordered. ZXDC also contains numerous other features in addition to the zinc fingers. Although the exact purpose of these domains is not yet known, they might assist in mediating interactions with other proteins or controlling the activity of the protein.

ZXDC has mostly been investigated in the context of developmental biology and cell fate determination in animals. Studies in fruit flies, for instance, have demonstrated that protein is crucial for the development of particular cell types, such as the cell precursors of the sensory organs in the peripheral nervous system.

== Function ==
ZXDC is highly conserved between species, showing the significance of this gene for cellular function. ZXDC is a member of the zinc finger family of proteins that are crucial for the regulation of genes and cellular functions in a variety of organisms.

ZXDC (ZXD Family Zinc Finger C) is a protein-coding gene that controls biological processes such as cell division, proliferation, and apoptosis. This gene produces a protein with two C2H2-type zinc fingers that are a member of the ZXD family.

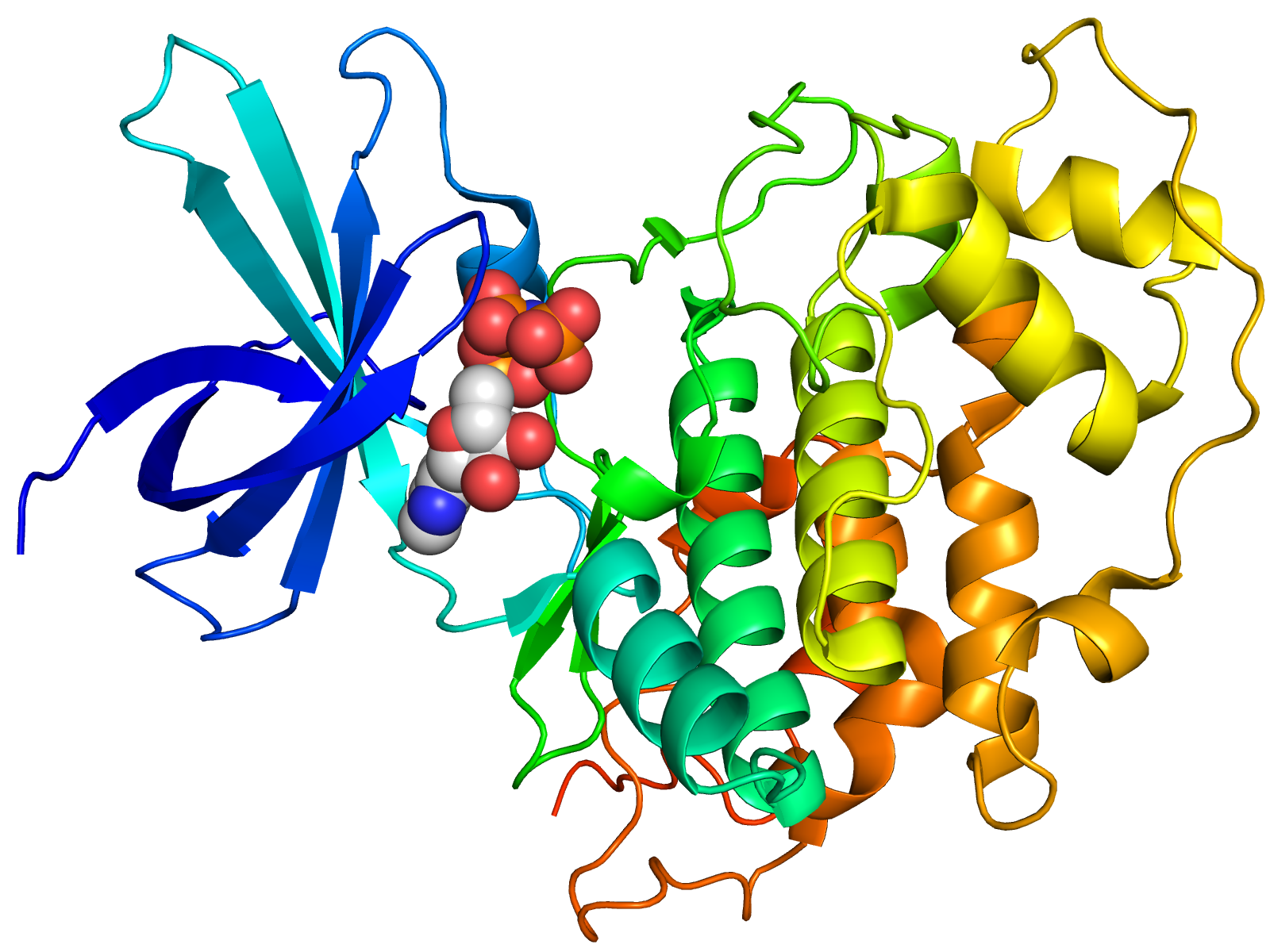
Image of gsk3β.

ZXDC has been linked to the formation of numerous cancer forms and it regulates the advancement of the cell cycle. It is also known to interact with other proteins, including GSK3β, a serine/threonine protein kinase implicated in a number of signaling pathways, and p53, an important tumor suppressor.

By regulating the expression of genes linked to the innate immune response, ZXDC has also been demonstrated to contribute to the regulation of immunological responses. As a result, it is believed that ZXDC could be a possible target for the creation of new remedies for autoimmune and cancerous conditions.

ZXDC is involved in controlling the circadian clock in cells, which regulates the daily cycles of physiological processes.

== Isolation ==
ZXDC's solubility is not well described in the literature and may vary depending on a number of variables, including the protein's expression system, the buffering situation, and the presence of other proteins or chemicals. But studies have shown the effective separation of ZXDC using a variety of techniques, including gel filtration and affinity chromatography, suggesting that the protein is probably soluble in some circumstances. For instance, one study found superior amounts of soluble protein and pure recombinant ZXDC protein generated in Escherichia Coli using immobilized metal affinity chromatography (IMAC).

== Role in disease ==
Numerous cancers, including breast, lung, and colorectal cancer, have been linked to ZXDC, according to studies. It is also considered to be a possible therapeutic target for autoimmune and cancer conditions. ZXDC abnormality has been linked to cancer progression and an unfavorable prognosis.

In breast cancer, low ZXDC expression has been associated with tumor invasiveness, lymph node metastases, and poor prognosis. ZXDC suppresses the growth and migration of breast cancer cells, acting as a tumor suppressor.

The emergence of a more aggressive form of lung cancer has been correlated with decreased ZXDC expression. Studies have demonstrated that increasing ZXDC expression can prevent tumor development and invasion in lung cancer cells.

In colorectal cancer, the loss of ZXDC expression has been connected to the advancement of the disease stage and lymph node metastasis. In addition, it has been proposed that ZXDC may function as a tumor suppressor by obstructing the Wnt/beta-catenin signaling pathway, which is frequently active in colorectal cancer.

Overall, these results indicate that ZXDC may be a key player in the initiation and development of cancer, and it may also hold interest as a diagnostic or therapeutic target for the treatment of cancer. To completely comprehend the processes underlying ZXDC's activity in cancer and to design specific treatments based on it, more study is necessary.
