= Healing =

Process of the restoration of health

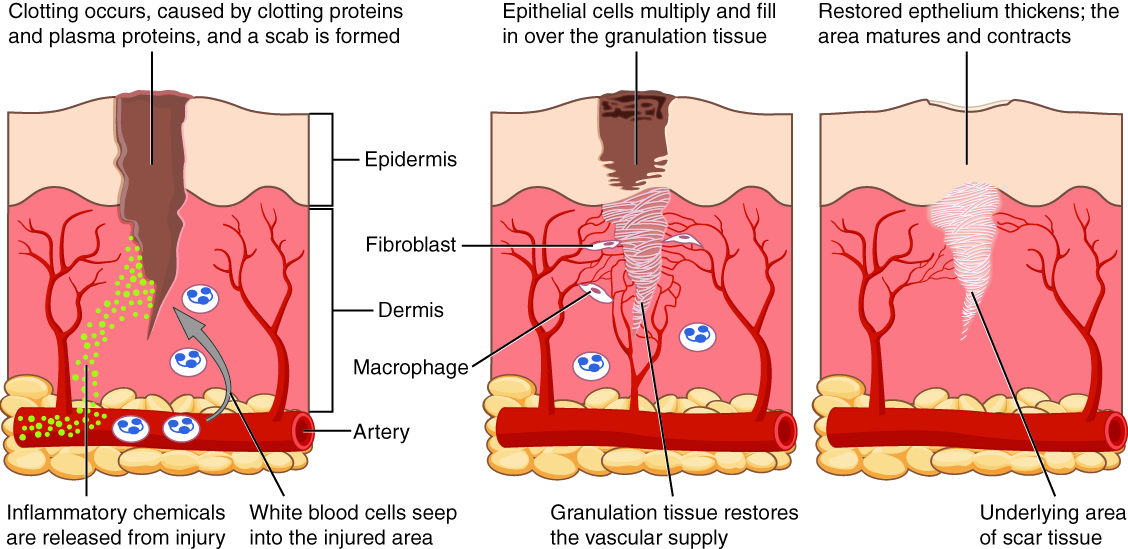
Diagram featuring stages of tissue healing

Regarding physical trauma or disease suffered by an organism, healing involves the repairing of damaged tissue(s), organs and the biological system as a whole and resumption of (normal) functioning. Medicine includes the process by which the cells in the body regenerate and repair to reduce the size of a damaged or necrotic area and replace it with new living tissue. The replacement can happen in two ways: by regeneration in which the necrotic cells are replaced by new cells that form "like" tissue as was originally there; or by repair in which injured tissue is replaced with scar tissue. Most organs will heal using a mixture of both mechanisms.

Within surgery, healing is more often referred to as recovery, and postoperative recovery has historically been viewed simply as restitution of function and readiness for discharge. More recently, it has been described as an energy‐requiring process to decrease physical symptoms, reach a level of emotional well‐being, regain functions, and re‐establish activities.

Healing is also referred to in the context of the grieving process.

In psychiatry and psychology, healing is the process by which neuroses and psychoses are resolved to the degree that the client is able to lead a normal or fulfilling existence without being overwhelmed by psychopathological phenomena. This process may involve psychotherapy, pharmaceutical treatment or alternative approaches such as traditional spiritual healing.

== Regeneration ==
In order for an injury to be healed by regeneration, the cell type that was destroyed must be able to replicate. Cells also need a collagen framework along which to grow. Alongside most cells there is either a basement membrane or a collagenous network made by fibroblasts that will guide the cells' growth. Since ischaemia and most toxins do not destroy collagen, it will continue to exist even when the cells around it are dead.

=== Example ===
Acute tubular necrosis (ATN) in the kidney is a case in which cells heal completely by regeneration. ATN occurs when the epithelial cells that line the kidney are destroyed by either a lack of oxygen (such as in hypovolemic shock, when blood supply to the kidneys is dramatically reduced), or by toxins (such as some antibiotics, toxic metals or carbon tetrachloride).

Although many of these epithelial cells are dead, there is typically patchy necrosis, meaning that there are patches of epithelial cells still alive. In addition, the collagen framework of the tubules remains completely intact.

The existing epithelial cells can replicate, and, using the basement membrane as a guide, eventually bring the kidney back to normal. After regeneration is complete, the damage is undetectable, even microscopically.

Healing must happen by repair in the case of injury to cells that are unable to regenerate (e.g. neurons). Also, damage to the collagen network (e.g. by enzymes or physical destruction), or its total collapse (as can happen in an infarct) cause healing to take place by repair.

== Genetics ==
Many genes play a role in healing. For instance, in wound healing, P21 has been found to allow mammals to heal spontaneously. It even allows some mammals (like mice) to heal wounds without scars. The LIN28 gene also plays a role in wound healing. It is dormant in most mammals. Also, the proteins MG53 and TGF beta 1 play important roles in wound healing.

== Wound healing ==
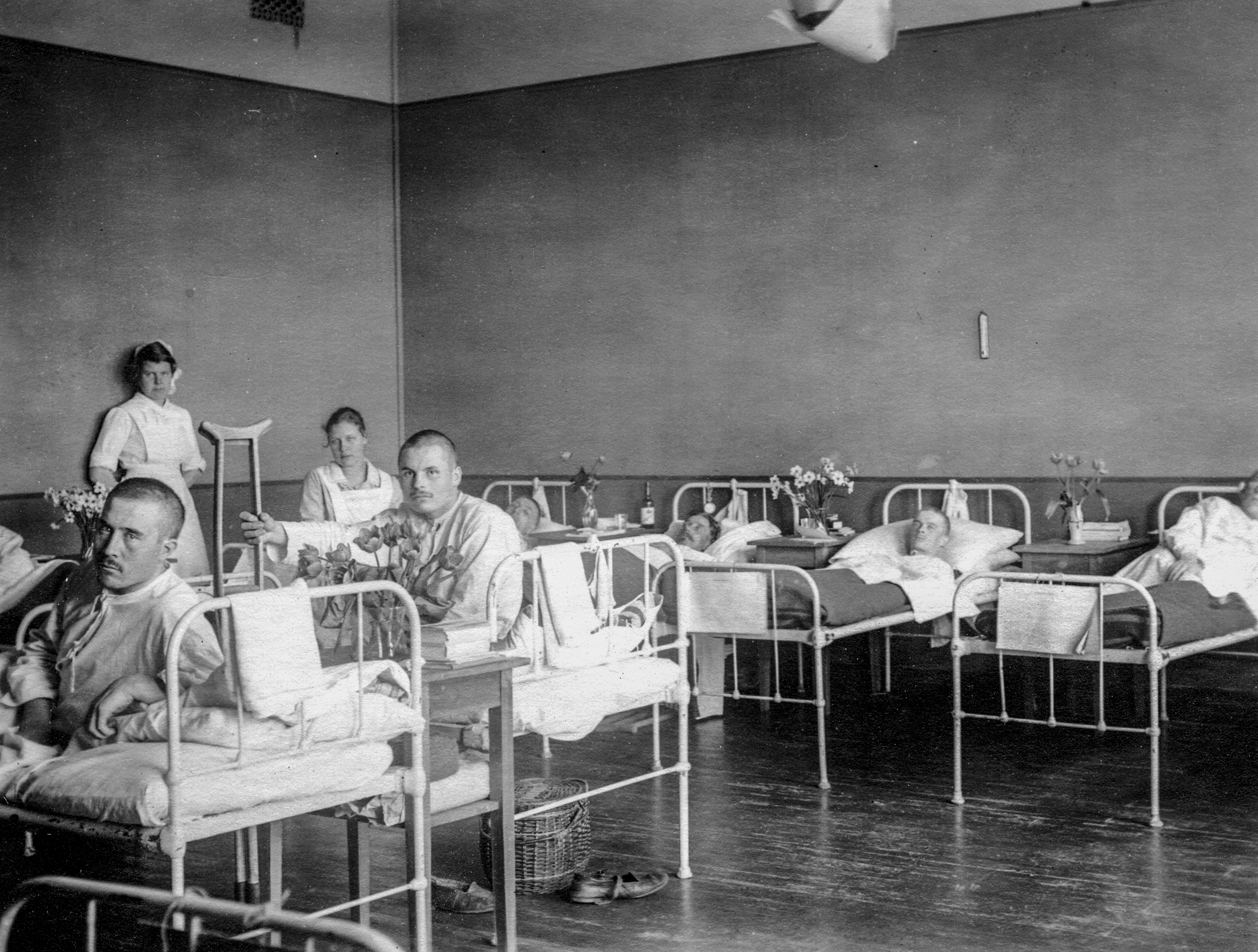
Wounded patients at the Red Cross Hospital in Tampere, Finland during the 1918 Finnish Civil War

In response to an incision or wound, a wound healing cascade is unleashed. This cascade takes place in four phases: clot formation, inflammation, proliferation, and maturation.

=== Clotting phase ===
Healing of a wound begins with clot formation to stop bleeding and to reduce infection by bacteria, viruses and fungi. Clotting is followed by neutrophil invasion three to 24 hours after the wound has been incurred, with mitoses beginning in epithelial cells after 24 to 48 hours.

=== Inflammation phase ===
In the inflammatory phase, macrophages and other phagocytic cells kill bacteria, debride damaged tissue and release chemical factors such as growth hormones that encourage fibroblasts, epithelial cells and endothelial cells which make new capillaries to migrate to the area and divide.

=== Proliferative phase ===
In the proliferative phase, immature granulation tissue containing plump, active fibroblasts forms. Fibroblasts quickly produce abundant type III collagen, which fills the defect left by an open wound. Granulation tissue moves, as a wave, from the border of the injury towards the center.

As granulation tissue matures, the fibroblasts produce less collagen and become more spindly in appearance. They begin to produce the much stronger type I collagen. Some of the fibroblasts mature into myofibroblasts which contain the same type of actin found in smooth muscle, which enables them to contract and reduce the size of the wound.

=== Maturation phase ===
During the maturation phase of wound healing, unnecessary vessels formed in granulation tissue are removed by apoptosis, and type III collagen is largely replaced by type I. Collagen which was originally disorganized is cross-linked and aligned along tension lines. This phase can last a year or longer. Ultimately a scar made of collagen, containing a small number of fibroblasts is left.

== Tissue damaged by inflammation ==
After inflammation has damaged tissue (when combatting bacterial infection for example) and pro-inflammatory eicosanoids have completed their function, healing proceeds in 4 phases.

=== Recall phase ===
In the recall phase the adrenal glands increase production of cortisol which shuts down eicosanoid production and inflammation.

=== Resolution phase ===
In the Resolution phase, pathogens and damaged tissue are removed by macrophages (white blood cells). Red blood cells are also removed from the damaged tissue by macrophages. Failure to remove all of the damaged cells and pathogens may retrigger inflammation. The two subsets of macrophage M1 & M2 plays a crucial role in this phase, M1 macrophage being a pro inflammatory while as M2 is a regenerative and the plasticity between the two subsets determine the tissue inflammation or repair.

=== Regeneration phase ===
In the Regeneration phase, blood vessels are repaired and new cells form in the damaged site similar to the cells that were damaged and removed. Some cells such as neurons and muscle cells (especially in the heart) are slow to recover.

=== Repair phase ===
In the Repair phase, new tissue is generated which requires a balance of anti-inflammatory and pro-inflammatory eicosanoids. Anti-inflammatory eicosanoids include lipoxins, epi-lipoxins, and resolvins, which cause release of growth hormones.

== See also ==
- Health
