= Induced pluripotent stem cell =

Pluripotent stem cell generated directly from a somatic cell

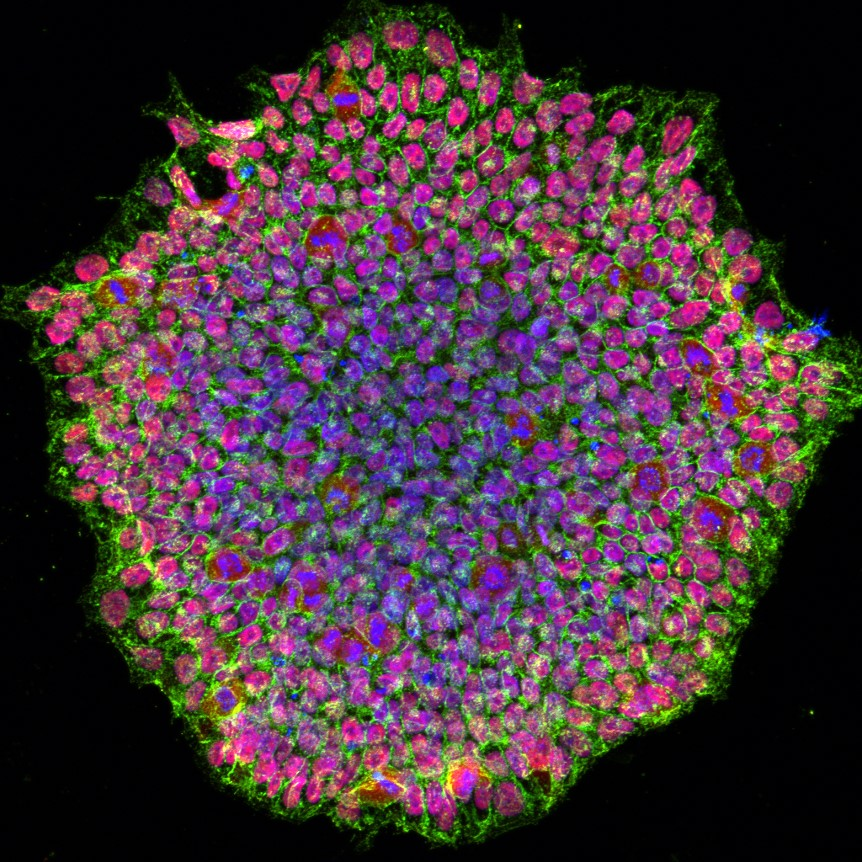
Confocal microscopic image of a colony of human induced pluripotent stem cells derived from a patient with oculocutaneous albinism. Blue indicates transcription factor Oct-4, green the protein SSEA4, and red the nuclei of the cells.

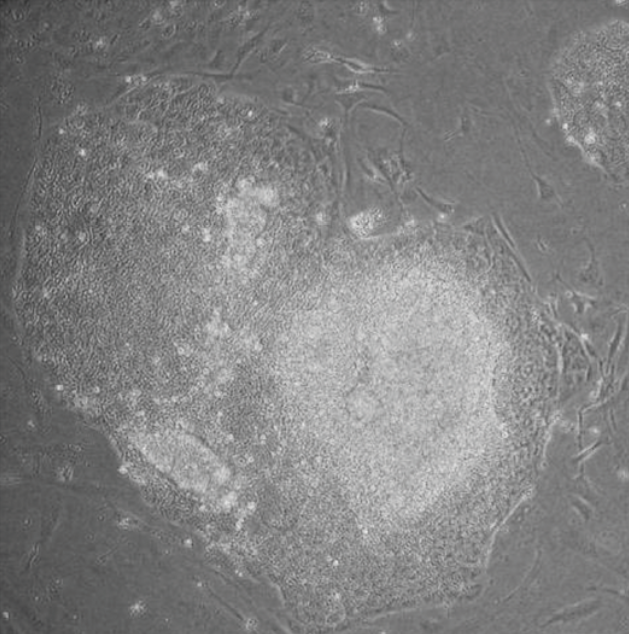
Human iPS cell colonies. The spindle-shaped cells in the background are mouse fibroblast cells. Only those cells composing the center colony are human iPS cells.

Induced pluripotent stem cells (also known as iPS cells or iPSCs) are a type of pluripotent stem cell that can be generated directly from a somatic cell. The iPSC technology was pioneered by Shinya Yamanaka and Kazutoshi Takahashi in Kyoto, Japan, who together showed in 2006 that the introduction of four specific genes (named c-Myc, Oct4, Sox2 and KLF4), collectively known as Yamanaka factors, encoding transcription factors could convert somatic cells into pluripotent stem cells. Shinya Yamanaka was awarded the 2012 Nobel Prize along with Sir John Gurdon "for the discovery that mature cells can be reprogrammed to become pluripotent."

Pluripotent stem cells hold promise in the field of regenerative medicine. Because they can propagate indefinitely, as well as give rise to every other cell type in the body (such as neurons, heart, pancreatic, and liver cells), they represent a single source of cells that could be used to replace those lost to damage or disease.

The best-known type of pluripotent stem cell is the embryonic stem cell. However, since the generation of embryonic stem cells involves the manipulation of unused pre-implantation stage IVF embryos , there has been controversy surrounding their use. Patient-matched embryonic stem cell lines can now be derived using somatic cell nuclear transfer (SCNT).

Since iPSCs can be derived directly from adult tissues, they not only bypass the need for embryos, but can be made in a patient-matched manner, which means that each individual could have their own pluripotent stem cell line. These unlimited supplies of autologous cells could be used to generate transplants without the risk of immune rejection. iPSCs are used in personalized drug discovery efforts and understanding the patient-specific basis of disease. In March 2026, Japan granted the first conditional, time-limited marketing approvals for iPSC-derived therapies, with further evaluation required after marketing.

Yamanaka named iPSCs with a lower case "i" due to the popularity of the iPod and other Apple products.

In his Nobel seminar, Yamanaka cited the earlier seminal work of Harold Weintraub on the role of myoblast determination protein 1 (MyoD) in reprogramming cell fate to a muscle lineage as an important precursor to the discovery of iPSCs.

== Production ==
A scheme of the generation of induced pluripotent stem (IPS) cells. (1) Isolate and culture donor cells. (2) Transduce stem cell-associated genes into the cells by viral vectors. Red cells indicate the cells expressing the exogenous genes. (3) Harvest and culture the cells according to ES cell culture, using mitotically inactivated feeder cells (lightgray). (4) A small subset of the transfected cells become iPS cells and generate ES-like colonies.

iPSCs are typically derived by introducing products of specific sets of pluripotency-associated genes, or "reprogramming factors", into a given cell type. The original set of reprogramming factors (also dubbed Yamanaka factors) are the transcription factors Oct4 (Pou5f1), Sox2, Klf4 and cMyc. While this combination is most conventional in producing iPSCs, each of the factors can be functionally replaced by related transcription factors, miRNAs, small molecules, or even non-related genes such as lineage specifiers. It is also clear that pro-mitotic factors such as C-MYC/L-MYC or repression of cell cycle checkpoints, such as p53, are conduits to creating a compliant cellular state for iPSC reprogramming.

iPSC derivation is typically a slow and inefficient process, taking one–two weeks for mouse cells and three–four weeks for human cells, with efficiencies around 0.01–0.1%. However, considerable advances have been made in improving the efficiency and the time it takes to obtain iPSCs. Upon introduction of reprogramming factors, cells begin to form colonies that resemble pluripotent stem cells, which can be isolated based on their morphology, conditions that select for their growth, or through expression of surface markers or reporter genes.

=== First generation (mouse) ===
Induced pluripotent stem cells were first generated by Shinya Yamanaka and Kazutoshi Takahashi at Kyoto University, Japan, in 2006. They hypothesized that genes important to embryonic stem cell (ESC) function might be able to induce an embryonic state in adult cells. They chose twenty-four genes previously identified as important in ESCs and used retroviruses to deliver these genes to mouse fibroblasts. The fibroblasts were engineered so that any cells reactivating the ESC-specific gene, Fbx15, could be isolated using antibiotic selection.

Upon delivery of all twenty-four factors, ESC-like colonies emerged that reactivated the Fbx15 reporter and could propagate indefinitely. To identify the genes necessary for reprogramming, the researchers removed one factor at a time from the pool of twenty-four. By this process, they identified four factors, Oct4, Sox2, cMyc, and Klf4, which were each necessary and together sufficient to generate ESC-like colonies under selection for reactivation of Fbx15.

=== Second generation (mouse) ===
In June 2007, three separate research groups, including that of Yamanaka's, a Harvard/University of California, Los Angeles collaboration, and a group at MIT, published studies that substantially improved on the reprogramming approach, giving rise to iPSCs that were indistinguishable from ESCs. Unlike the first generation of iPSCs, these second generation iPSCs produced viable chimeric mice and contributed to the mouse germline, thereby achieving the 'gold standard' for pluripotent stem cells.

These second-generation iPSCs were derived from mouse fibroblasts by retroviral-mediated expression of the same four transcription factors (Oct4, Sox2, cMyc, Klf4). However, instead of using Fbx15 to select for pluripotent cells, the researchers used Nanog, a gene that is functionally important in ESCs. By using this different strategy, the researchers created iPSCs that were functionally identical to ESCs.

=== Human induced pluripotent stem cells ===
==== Generation from human fibroblasts ====
Reprogramming of human cells to iPSCs was reported in November 2007 by two independent research groups: Shinya Yamanaka of Kyoto University, Japan, who pioneered the original iPSC method, and James Thomson of University of Wisconsin-Madison who was the first to derive human embryonic stem cells. With the same principle used in mouse reprogramming, Yamanaka's group successfully transformed human fibroblasts into iPSCs with the same four pivotal genes, Oct4, Sox2, Klf4, and cMyc, using a retroviral system, while Thomson and colleagues used a different set of factors, Oct4, Sox2, Nanog, and Lin28, using a lentiviral system.

==== Generation from additional cell types ====
Obtaining fibroblasts to produce iPSCs involves a skin biopsy, and there has been a push towards identifying cell types that are more easily accessible. In 2008, iPSCs were derived from human keratinocytes, which could be obtained from a single hair pluck. In 2010, iPSCs were derived from peripheral blood cells, and in 2012, iPSCs were made from renal epithelial cells in the urine.

Other considerations for starting cell type include mutational load (for example, skin cells may harbor more mutations due to UV exposure), time it takes to expand the population of starting cells, and the ability to differentiate into a given cell type.

=== Genes used to produce iPSCs ===
The generation of induced pluripotent cells is crucially dependent on the transcription factors used for the induction.

Oct-3/4 and certain products of the Sox gene family (Sox1, Sox2, Sox3, and Sox15) have been identified as crucial transcriptional regulators involved in the induction process whose absence makes induction impossible. Additional genes, however, including certain members of the Klf family (Klf1, Klf2, Klf4, and Klf5), the Myc family (c-myc, L-myc, and N-myc), Nanog, and LIN28, have been identified to increase the induction efficiency.

- Oct-3/4 (Pou5f1) Oct-3/4 is one of the family of octamer ("Oct") transcription factors, and plays a crucial role in maintaining pluripotency. The absence of Oct-3/4 in Oct-3/4^{+} cells, such as blastomeres and embryonic stem cells, leads to spontaneous trophoblast differentiation, and presence of Oct-3/4 thus gives rise to the pluripotency and differentiation potential of embryonic stem cells. Various other genes in the "Oct" family, including Oct-3/4's close relatives, Oct1 and Oct6, fail to elicit induction, thus demonstrating the exclusiveness of Oct-3/4 to the induction process. Schöler showed that Oct4 overexpression during reprogramming causes epigenetic changes deteriorating the quality of iPSCs. Comparing to OSKM (Oct4, Sox2, Klf4 and c-Myc) new SKM (Sox2, Klf4 and c-Myc) reprogramming generates iPSCs with developmental potential equivalent to embryonic stem cell, as determined by their ability to generate all-iPSC mice through tetraploid embryo complementation. iPSCs with higher developmental potential could also be generated by enhancing dimerization between Oct4 and Sox2 using a chimeric Sox factor.
- Sox family: The Sox family of transcription factors is associated with maintaining pluripotency similar to Oct-3/4, although it is associated with multipotent and unipotent stem cells in contrast with Oct-3/4, which is exclusively expressed in pluripotent stem cells. While Sox2 was the initial gene used for induction by Yamanaka et al., Jaenisch et al., and Thomson et al., other transcription factors in the Sox family have been found to work as well in the induction process. Sox1 yields iPSCs with a similar efficiency as Sox2, and genes Sox3, Sox15, and Sox18 also generate iPSCs, although with decreased efficiency. Velychko et al. engineered a chimeric super-reprogramming factor, Sox2-17 or "super-Sox", which enhanced or allowed generation of mouse, human, cynomolgus monkey, porcine and bovine iPSCs.
- Klf family: Klf4 of the Klf family of transcription factors was initially identified by Yamanaka et al. and confirmed by Jaenisch et al. as a factor for the generation of mouse iPS cells and was demonstrated by Yamanaka et al. as a factor for generation of human iPS cells. However, Thomson et al. reported that Klf4 was unnecessary for generation of human iPS cells and in fact failed to generate human iPS cells. Klf2 and Klf4 were found to be factors capable of generating iPS cells, and related genes Klf1 and Klf5 did as well, although with reduced efficiency.
- Myc family: The Myc family of transcription factors are proto-oncogenes implicated in cancer. Yamanaka et al. and Jaenisch et al. demonstrated that c-myc is a factor implicated in the generation of mouse iPS cells and Yamanaka et al. demonstrated it was a factor implicated in the generation of human iPS cells. However, Thomson et al., Yamanaka et al. usage of the "myc" family of genes in induction of iPS cells is troubling for the eventuality of iPS cells as clinical therapies, as 25% of mice transplanted with c-myc-induced iPS cells developed lethal teratomas. N-myc and L-myc have been identified to induce instead of c-myc with similar efficiency.
- Nanog: In embryonic stem cells, Nanog, along with Oct-3/4 and Sox2, is necessary in promoting pluripotency. Therefore, it was surprising when Yamanaka et al. reported that Nanog was unnecessary for induction although Thomson et al. has reported it is possible to generate iPS cells with Nanog as one of the factors.
- LIN28: LIN28 is an mRNA binding protein expressed in embryonic stem cells and embryonic carcinoma cells associated with differentiation and proliferation. Thomson et al. demonstrated that LIN28 is a factor in iPSC generation in combination with Oct4, Sox2, and Nanog.
- Glis1: Glis1 is a transcription factor that can be used with Oct-3/4, Sox2 and Klf4 to induce pluripotency. It poses numerous advantages when used instead of C-myc.

=== Challenges in reprogramming cells to pluripotency ===
Although the methods pioneered by Yamanaka and others have demonstrated that adult cells can be reprogrammed to iPS cells, there are still challenges associated with this technology:

1. Low efficiency: in general, the conversion to iPS cells has been incredibly low. For example, the rate at which somatic cells were reprogrammed into iPS cells in Yamanaka's original mouse study was 0.01–0.1%. The low efficiency rate may reflect the need for precise timing, balance, and absolute levels of expression of the reprogramming genes. It may also suggest a need for rare genetic or epigenetic changes in the original somatic cell population or in the prolonged culture. However, recently a path was found for efficient reprogramming which required downregulation of the nucleosome remodeling and deacetylation (NuRD) complex. Overexpression of Mbd3, a subunit of NuRD, inhibits induction of iPSCs. Depletion of Mbd3, on the other hand, improves reprogramming efficiency, that results in deterministic and synchronized iPS cell reprogramming (near 100% efficiency within seven days from mouse and human cells).
2. Genomic Insertion: genomic integration of the transcription factors limits the utility of the transcription factor approach because of the risk of mutations being inserted into the target cell's genome. A common strategy for avoiding genomic insertion has been to use a different vector for input. Plasmids, adenoviruses, and transposon vectors have all been explored, but these often come with the tradeoff of lower throughput.
3. Tumorigenicity: Depending on the methods used, reprogramming of adult cells to obtain iPSCs may pose significant risks that could limit their use in humans. For example, if viruses are used to genomically alter the cells, the expression of oncogenes (cancer-causing genes) may potentially be triggered. In February 2008, scientists announced the discovery of a technique that could remove oncogenes after the induction of pluripotency, thereby increasing the potential use of iPS cells in human diseases. In another study, Yamanaka reported that one can create iPSCs without the oncogene c-Myc. The process took longer and was not as efficient, but the resulting chimeras did not develop cancer. Inactivation or deletion of the tumor suppressor p53, which is a key regulator of cancer, significantly increases reprogramming efficiency. Thus there seems to be a tradeoff between reprogramming efficiency and tumor generation.
4. Incomplete reprogramming: reprogramming also faces the challenge of completeness. This is particularly challenging because the genome-wide epigenetic code must be reformatted to that of the target cell type in order to fully reprogram a cell. However, three separate groups were able to find mouse embryonic fibroblast (MEF)-derived iPS cells that could be injected into tetraploid blastocysts and resulted in the live birth of mice derived entirely from iPS cells, thus ending the debate over the equivalence of embryonic stem cells (ESCs) and iPS with regard to pluripotency.

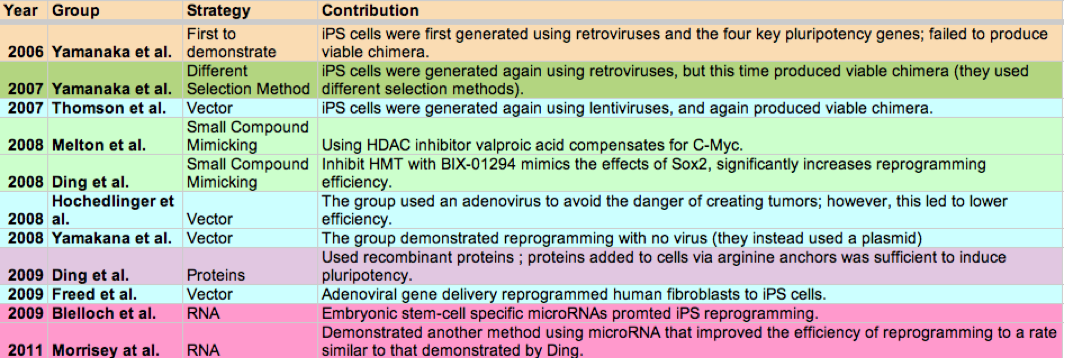
This timeline summarizes the key strategies and techniques used to develop iPS cells in the first five years after Yamanaka et al.'s 2006 breakthrough. Rows of similar colors represent studies that used similar strategies for reprogramming.

The table on the right summarizes the key strategies and techniques used to develop iPS cells in the first five years after Yamanaka et al.'s 2006 breakthrough. Rows of similar colors represent studies that used similar strategies for reprogramming.

=== Alternative approaches ===
==== Mimicking transcription factors with chemicals ====
One of the main strategies for avoiding problems (1) and (2) has been to use small molecules that can mimic the effects of transcription factors. These compounds can compensate for a reprogramming factor that does not effectively target the genome or fails at reprogramming for another reason; thus they raise reprogramming efficiency. They also avoid the problem of genomic integration, which in some cases contributes to tumor genesis. Key studies using such strategy were conducted in 2008. Melton et al. studied the effects of histone deacetylase (HDAC) inhibitor valproic acid. They found that it increased reprogramming efficiency 100-fold (compared to Yamanaka's traditional transcription factor method). The researchers proposed that this compound was mimicking the signaling that is usually caused by the transcription factor c-Myc. A similar type of compensation mechanism was proposed to mimic the effects of Sox2. In 2008, Ding et al. used the inhibition of histone methyl transferase (HMT) with BIX-01294 in combination with the activation of calcium channels in the plasma membrane in order to increase reprogramming efficiency. Deng et al. of Beijing University reported in July 2013 that induced pluripotent stem cells can be created without any genetic modification. They used a cocktail of seven small-molecule compounds including DZNep to induce the mouse somatic cells into stem cells which they called CiPS cells with the efficiency – at 0.2% – comparable to those using standard iPSC production techniques. The CiPS cells were introduced into developing mouse embryos and were found to contribute to all major cell types, proving its pluripotency.

Ding et al. demonstrated an alternative to transcription factor reprogramming through the use of drug-like chemicals. By studying the mesenchymal-epithelial transition (MET) process in which fibroblasts are pushed to a stem-cell like state, Ding's group identified two chemicals – ALK5 inhibitor SB431412 and MEK (mitogen-activated protein kinase) inhibitor PD0325901 – which was found to increase the efficiency of the classical genetic method by 100 fold. Adding a third compound known to be involved in the cell survival pathway, thiazovivin further increases the efficiency by 200 fold. Using the combination of these three compounds also decreased the reprogramming process of the human fibroblasts from four weeks to two weeks.

In April 2009, it was demonstrated that generation of iPS cells is possible without any genetic alteration of the adult cell: a repeated treatment of the cells with certain proteins channeled into the cells via poly-arginine anchors was sufficient to induce pluripotency. The acronym given for those iPSCs is piPSCs (protein-induced pluripotent stem cells).

==== Alternate vectors ====
Another key strategy for avoiding problems such as tumorgenesis and low throughput has been to use alternate forms of vectors: adenoviruses, plasmids, and naked DNA or protein compounds.

In 2008, Hochedlinger et al. used an adenovirus to transport the requisite four transcription factors into the DNA of skin and liver cells of mice, resulting in cells identical to ESCs. The adenovirus is unique from other vectors like viruses and retroviruses because it does not incorporate any of its own genes into the targeted host and avoids the potential for insertional mutagenesis. In 2009, Freed et al. demonstrated successful reprogramming of human fibroblasts to iPS cells. Another advantage of using adenoviruses is that they only need to present for a brief amount of time in order for effective reprogramming to take place.

Also in 2008, Yamanaka et al. found that they could transfer the four necessary genes with a plasmid. The Yamanaka group successfully reprogrammed mouse cells by transfection with two plasmid constructs carrying the reprogramming factors; the first plasmid expressed c-Myc, while the second expressed the other three factors (Oct4, Klf4, and Sox2). Although the plasmid methods avoid viruses, they still require cancer-promoting genes to accomplish reprogramming. The other main issue with these methods is that they tend to be much less efficient compared to retroviral methods. Furthermore, transfected plasmids have been shown to integrate into the host genome and therefore they still pose the risk of insertional mutagenesis. Because non-retroviral approaches have demonstrated such low efficiency levels, researchers have attempted to effectively rescue the technique with what is known as the PiggyBac Transposon System. Several studies have demonstrated that this system can effectively deliver the key reprogramming factors without leaving footprint mutations in the host cell genome. The PiggyBac Transposon System involves the re-excision of exogenous genes, which eliminates the issue of insertional mutagenesis.

==== Stimulus-triggered acquisition of pluripotency cell ====
In January 2014, two articles were published claiming that a type of pluripotent stem cell can be generated by subjecting the cells to certain types of stress (bacterial toxin, a low pH of 5.7, or physical squeezing); the resulting cells were called STAP cells, for stimulus-triggered acquisition of pluripotency.

In light of difficulties that other labs had replicating the results of the surprising study, in March 2014, one of the co-authors has called for the articles to be retracted. On 4 June 2014, the lead author, Obokata agreed to retract both the papers after she was found to have committed 'research misconduct' as concluded in an investigation by RIKEN on 1 April 2014.

==== RNA molecules ====
MicroRNAs are short RNA molecules that bind to complementary sequences on messenger RNA and block expression of a gene. Measuring variations in microRNA expression in iPS cells can be used to predict their differentiation potential. Addition of microRNAs can also be used to enhance iPS potential. Several mechanisms have been proposed. ES cell-specific microRNA molecules (such as miR-291, miR-294 and miR-295) enhance the efficiency of induced pluripotency by acting downstream of c-Myc. MicroRNAs can also block expression of repressors of Yamanaka's four transcription factors, and there may be additional mechanisms that induce reprogramming even in the absence of added exogenous transcription factors.

== Identity ==
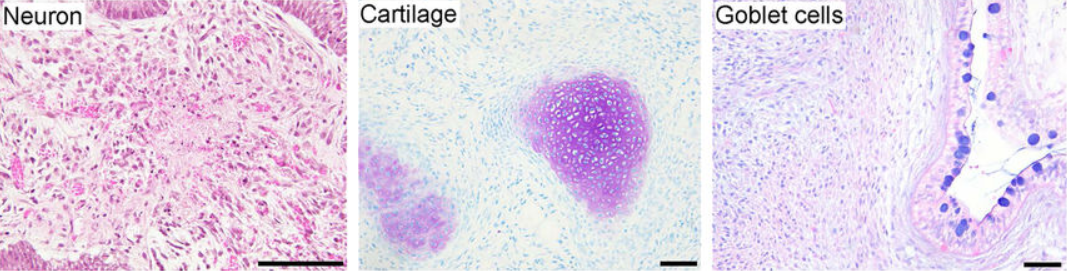
Three germ line cells/tissues differentiated from iPSCs: neurons (ectoderm), cartilage (soft bone, mesoderm) and goblet cells in intestine (endoderm)

Induced pluripotent stem cells are similar to natural pluripotent stem cells, such as embryonic stem cells, in many aspects, such as the expression of certain stem cell genes and proteins, chromatin methylation patterns, doubling time, embryoid body formation, teratoma formation, viable chimera formation, and potency and differentiability, but the full extent of their relation to natural pluripotent stem cells is still being assessed.

Gene expression and genome-wide H3K4me3 and H3K27me3 were found to be extremely similar between ES and iPS cells. The generated iPSCs were remarkably similar to naturally isolated pluripotent stem cells (such as mouse and human embryonic stem cells, mESCs and hESCs, respectively) in the following respects, thus confirming the identity, authenticity, and pluripotency of iPSCs to naturally isolated pluripotent stem cells:

- Cellular biological properties
  - Morphology: iPSCs were morphologically similar to ESCs. Each cell had round shape, large nucleolus and scant cytoplasm. Colonies of iPSCs were also similar to that of ESCs. Human iPSCs formed sharp-edged, flat, tightly packed colonies similar to hESCs and mouse iPSCs formed the colonies similar to mESCs, less flat and more aggregated colonies than that of hESCs.
  - Growth properties: Doubling time and mitotic activity are cornerstones of ESCs, as stem cells must self-renew as part of their definition. iPSCs were mitotically active, actively self-renewing, proliferating, and dividing at a rate equal to ESCs.
  - Stem cell markers: iPSCs expressed cell surface antigenic markers expressed on ESCs. Human iPSCs expressed the markers specific to hESC, including SSEA-3, SSEA-4, TRA-1-60, TRA-1-81, TRA-2-49/6E, and Nanog. Mouse iPSCs expressed SSEA-1 but not SSEA-3 nor SSEA-4, similarly to mESCs.
  - Stem Cell Genes: iPSCs expressed genes expressed in undifferentiated ESCs, including Oct-3/4, Sox2, Nanog, GDF3, REX1, FGF4, ESG1, DPPA2, DPPA4, and hTERT.
  - Telomerase activity: Telomerases are necessary to sustain cell division unrestricted by the Hayflick limit of ~50 cell divisions. hESCs express high telomerase activity to sustain self-renewal and proliferation, and human iPSCs also demonstrate high telomerase activity and express hTERT (human telomerase reverse transcriptase), a necessary component in the telomerase protein complex.
- Pluripotency: iPSCs were capable of differentiation in a fashion similar to ESCs into fully differentiated tissues.
  - Neural differentiation: iPSCs were differentiated into neurons, expressing βIII-tubulin, tyrosine hydroxylase, AADC, DAT, ChAT, LMX1B, and MAP2. The presence of catecholamine-associated enzymes may indicate that iPSCs, like hESCs, may be differentiable into dopaminergic neurons. Stem cell-associated genes were downregulated after differentiation.
  - Cardiac differentiation: iPSCs were differentiated into cardiomyocytes that spontaneously began beating. Cardiomyocytes expressed TnTc, MEF2C, MYL2A, MYHCβ, and NKX2.5. Stem cell-associated genes were downregulated after differentiation.
  - Teratoma formation: iPSCs injected into immunodeficient mice spontaneously formed teratomas after nine weeks. Teratomas are tumors of multiple lineages containing tissue derived from the three germ layers endoderm, mesoderm and ectoderm; this is unlike other tumors, which typically are of only one cell type. Teratoma formation is a landmark test for pluripotency.
  - Embryoid body: hESCs in culture spontaneously form ball-like embryo-like structures termed "embryoid bodies", which consist of a core of mitotically active and differentiating hESCs and a periphery of fully differentiated cells from all three germ layers. iPSCs also form embryoid bodies and have peripheral differentiated cells.
  - Chimeric mice: hESCs naturally reside within the inner cell mass (embryoblast) of blastocysts, and in the embryoblast, differentiate into the embryo while the blastocyst's shell (trophoblast) differentiates into extraembryonic tissues. The hollow trophoblast is unable to form a living embryo, and thus it is necessary for the embryonic stem cells within the embryoblast to differentiate and form the embryo. iPSCs were injected by micropipette into a trophoblast, and the blastocyst was transferred to recipient females. Chimeric living mouse pups were created: mice with iPSC derivatives incorporated all across their bodies with 10–90% chimerism.
  - Tetraploid complementation: iPS cells from mouse fetal fibroblasts injected into tetraploid blastocysts (which themselves can only form extra-embryonic tissues) can form whole, non-chimeric, fertile mice, although with low success rate. The efficiency of all-PSC mouse production could be boosted by a short exposure of pluripotent stem cell line to an episomal plasmid encoding for engineered Sox2 and Klf4 (SK cocktail).
- Epigenetic reprogramming
  - Promoter demethylation: Methylation is the transfer of a methyl group to a DNA base, typically the transfer of a methyl group to a cytosine molecule in a CpG site (adjacent cytosine/guanine sequence). Widespread methylation of a gene interferes with expression by preventing the activity of expression proteins, or by recruiting enzymes that interfere with expression. Thus, methylation of a gene effectively silences it by preventing transcription. Promoters of pluripotency-associated genes, including Oct-3/4, Rex1, and Nanog, were demethylated in iPSCs, demonstrating their promoter activity and the active promotion and expression of pluripotency-associated genes in iPSCs.
  - DNA methylation globally: Human iPS cells are highly similar to ES cells in their patterns of which cytosines are methylated, more than to any other cell type. However, on the order of a thousand sites show differences in several iPS cell lines. Half of these resemble the somatic cell line the iPS cells were derived from, the rest are iPSC-specific. Tens of regions which are megabases in size have also been found where iPS cells are not reprogrammed to the ES cell state.
  - Histone demethylation: Histones are compacting proteins that are structurally localized to DNA sequences that can affect their activity through various chromatin-related modifications. H3 histones associated with Oct-3/4, Sox2, and Nanog were demethylated, indicating the expression of Oct-3/4, Sox2, and Nanog.

== Safety ==
- The major concern with the potential clinical application of iPSCs is their propensity to form tumors. Much the same as ESC, iPSCs readily form teratoma when injected into immunodeficient mice. Teratoma formation is considered a major obstacle to stem-cell based regenerative medicine by the FDA.
- A more recent study on motor functional recovery after spinal cord injuries in mice showed that after human-induced pluripotent stem cells were transplanted into the mice, the cells differentiated into three neural lineages in the spinal cord. The cells stimulated regrowth of the damaged spinal cord, maintained myelination, and formed synapses. These positive outcomes were observed for over 112 days after the spinal cord injury, without tumor formation. Nevertheless, a follow-up study by the same group showed distinct clones of human-induced pluripotent stem cells eventually formed tumors.
- Since iPSCs can only be produced with high efficiency at this time using modifications, they are generally predicted to be less safe and more tumorigenic than hESC. All the genes that have been shown to promote iPSC formation have also been linked to cancer in one way or another. Some of the genes are known oncogenes, including the members of the Myc family. While omitting Myc still allows for iPSC formation, the efficiency is reduced up to 100 fold.
- A non-genetic method of producing iPSCs has been demonstrated using recombinant proteins, but its efficiency was quite low. However, refinements to this methodology yielding higher efficiency may lead to production of safer iPSCs. Other approaches such as using adenoviruses or plasmids are generally thought to be safer than retroviral methods.
- An important area for future studies in the iPSC field is directly testing iPSC tumorigenicity using methods that mimic the approaches that would be used for regenerative medicine therapies. Such studies are crucial since iPSCs not only form teratoma, but also mice derived from iPSCs have a high incidence of death from malignant cancer. A 2010 paper was published in the journal Stem Cells indicating that iPS cells are far more tumorigenic than ESC, supporting the notion that iPS cell safety is a serious concern.
- Concern regarding the immunogenicity of IPS cells arose in 2011 when Zhou et al. performed a study involving a teratoma formation assay and demonstrated that IPS cells produced an immune response strong enough to cause rejection of the cells. When a similar procedure was performed on genetically equivalent ES cells however, Zhou et al. found teratomas, which indicated that the cells were tolerated by the immune system. In 2013, Araki et al. attempted to reproduce the conclusion obtained by Zhou et al. using a different procedure. They took cells from a chimera that had been grown from IPSC clones and a mouse embryo, this tissue was then transplanted into syngenic mice. They conducted a similar trial using ES cells instead of IPSC clone and compared the results. Findings indicate that there was no significant difference in the immunogenic response produced by the IPS cells and the ES cells. Furthermore, Araki et al. reported little or no immunogenic response for both cell lines. Thus, Araki et al. was unable to come to the same conclusion as Zhou et al.

== Medical research ==
The task of producing iPS cells continues to be challenging due to the challenges described above. A key tradeoff to overcome is that between efficiency and genomic integration. Most methods that do not rely on the integration of transgenes are inefficient, while those that do rely on the integration of transgenes face the problems of incomplete reprogramming and tumor genesis, although a vast number of techniques and methods have been attempted. Another large set of strategies is to perform a proteomic characterization of iPS cells. Further studies and new strategies should generate optimal solutions to these challenges. One approach might attempt to combine the positive attributes of these strategies into an ultimately effective technique for reprogramming cells to iPS cells.

Another approach is the use of iPS cells derived from patients to identify therapeutic drugs able to rescue a phenotype. For instance, iPS cell lines derived from patients affected by ectodermal dysplasia syndrome (EEC), in which the p63 gene is mutated, display abnormal epithelial commitment that could be partially rescued by a small compound.

=== Disease modeling and drug development ===
An attractive feature of human iPS cells is the ability to derive them from adult patients to study the cellular basis of human disease. Since iPS cells are self-renewing and pluripotent, they represent a theoretically unlimited source of patient-derived cells which can be turned into any type of cell in the body. This is particularly important because many other types of human cells derived from patients tend to stop growing after a few passages in laboratory culture. iPS cells have been generated for a wide variety of human genetic diseases, including common disorders such as Down syndrome and polycystic kidney disease. In many instances, the patient-derived iPS cells exhibit cellular defects not observed in iPS cells from healthy subjects, providing insight into the pathophysiology of the disease. An international collaborated project, StemBANCC, was formed in 2012 to build a collection of iPS cell lines for drug screening for a variety of diseases. Managed by the University of Oxford, the effort pooled funds and resources from 10 pharmaceutical companies and 23 universities. The goal is to generate a library of 1,500 iPS cell lines which will be used in early drug testing by providing a simulated human disease environment. Furthermore, combining hiPSC technology and small molecule or genetically encoded voltage and calcium indicators provided a large-scale and high-throughput platform for cardiovascular drug safety screening.

=== Organ synthesis ===
A proof-of-concept of using induced pluripotent stem cells (iPSCs) to generate human organ for transplantation was reported by researchers from Japan. Human 'liver buds' (iPSC-LBs) were grown from a mixture of three different kinds of stem cells: hepatocyte (for liver function) coaxed from iPSCs; endothelial stem cells (to form lining of blood vessels) from umbilical cord blood; and mesenchymal stem cells (to form connective tissue). This new approach allows different cell types to self-organize into a complex organ, mimicking the process in fetal development. After growing in vitro for a few days, the liver buds were transplanted into mice where the 'liver' quickly connected with the host blood vessels and continued to grow. Most importantly, it performed regular liver functions including metabolizing drugs and producing liver-specific proteins. Further studies will monitor the longevity of the transplanted organ in the host body (ability to integrate or avoid rejection) and whether it will transform into tumors.

=== Organ regeneration ===
In 2021, a switchable Yamanaka factors-reprogramming-based approach for regeneration of damaged heart without tumor-formation was demonstrated in mice and was successful if the intervention was carried out immediately before or after a heart attack. In 2020, Japan first transplanted lab-grown heart cells into a human patient.

=== Tissue repair ===
Embryonic cord-blood cells were induced into pluripotent stem cells using plasmid DNA. Using cell surface endothelial/pericytic markers CD31 and CD146, researchers identified 'vascular progenitor', the high-quality, multipotent vascular stem cells. After the iPS cells were injected directly into the vitreous of the damaged retina of mice, the stem cells engrafted into the retina, grew and repaired the vascular vessels.

Labelled iPSCs-derived NSCs injected into laboratory animals with brain lesions were shown to migrate to the lesions and some motor function improvement was observed.

=== Cardiomyocytes ===
Beating cardiac muscle cells, iPSC-derived cardiomyocytes, can be mass-produced using chemically defined differentiation protocols. These protocols typically modulate the same developmental signaling pathways required for heart development. These iPSC-cardiomyocytes can recapitulate genetic arrhythmias and cardiac drug responses, since they exhibit the same genetic background as the patient from which they were derived.

In June 2014, Takara Bio received technology transfer from iHeart Japan, a venture company from Kyoto University's iPS Cell Research Institute, to make it possible to exclusively use technologies and patents that induce differentiation of iPS cells into cardiomyocytes in Asia. The company announced the idea of selling cardiomyocytes to pharmaceutical companies and universities to help develop new drugs for heart disease.

On 9 March 2018, the Specified Regenerative Medicine Committee of Osaka University officially approved the world's first clinical research plan to transplant a "myocardial sheet" made from iPS cells into the heart of patients with severe heart failure. Osaka University announced that it had filed an application with the Ministry of Health, Labor and Welfare on the same day.

On 16 May 2018, the clinical research plan was approved by the Ministry of Health, Labor and Welfare's expert group with a condition.

In October 2019, a group at Okayama University developed a model of ischemic heart disease using cardiomyocytes differentiated from iPS cells.

=== Red blood cells ===
Although a pint of donated blood contains about two trillion red blood cells and over 107 million blood donations are collected globally, there is still a critical need for blood for transfusion. In 2014, type O red blood cells were synthesized at the Scottish National Blood Transfusion Service from iPSC. The cells were induced to become a mesoderm and then blood cells and then red blood cells. The final step was to make them eject their nuclei and mature properly. Type O can be transfused into all patients. Human clinical trials were not expected to begin before 2016.

=== Clinical trials ===
The first human clinical trial using autologous iPSCs was approved by the Japan Ministry Health and was to be conducted in 2014 at the Riken Center for Developmental Biology in Kobe. However the trial was suspended after Japan's new regenerative medicine laws came into effect in November 2015. More specifically, an existing set of guidelines was strengthened to have the force of law (previously mere recommendations). iPSCs derived from skin cells from six patients with wet age-related macular degeneration were reprogrammed to differentiate into retinal pigment epithelial (RPE) cells. The cell sheet would be transplanted into the affected retina where the degenerated RPE tissue was excised. Safety and vision restoration monitoring were to last one to three years.

In March 2017, a team led by Masayo Takahashi completed the first successful transplant of iPS-derived retinal cells from a donor into the eye of a person with advanced macular degeneration. However it was reported that they are now having complications. The benefits of using autologous iPSCs are that there is theoretically no risk of rejection and that it eliminates the need to use embryonic stem cells. However, these iPSCs were derived from another person.

New clinical trials involving iPSCs are now ongoing not only in Japan, but also in the US and Europe. Research in 2021 on the trial registry Clinicaltrials.gov identified 129 trial listings mentioning iPSCs, but most were non-interventional.

On 6 March 2026, Japan's Ministry of Health, Labour and Welfare granted conditional, time-limited marketing approval to two allogeneic iPSC-derived therapies: Amchepry (raguneprocel) for Parkinson's disease and RiHEART for ischemic cardiomyopathy. These were the first iPSC-derived therapies to receive marketing approval. The approval scheme requires further evaluation of safety and confirmation of efficacy after marketing before applications for full approval.

=== Strategy for obtaining universal iPSCs ===
To make iPSC-based regenerative medicine technologies available to more patients, it is necessary to create universal iPSCs that can be transplanted independently of haplotypes of HLA. The current strategy for the creation of universal iPSCs has two main goals: to remove HLA expression and to prevent NK cells attacks due to deletion of HLA. Deletion of the B2M and CIITA genes using the CRISPR/Cas9 system has been reported to suppress the expression of HLA class I and class II, respectively. To avoid NK cell attacks. transduction of ligands inhibiting NK-cells, such as HLA-E and CD47 has been used. HLA-C is left unchanged, since the 12 common HLA-C alleles are enough to cover 95% of the world's population.

=== Anti-aging properties ===
A multipotent mesenchymal stem cell, when induced into pluripotence, holds great promise to slow or reverse aging phenotypes. Such anti-aging properties were demonstrated in early clinical trials in 2017. In 2020, Stanford University researchers concluded after studying elderly mice that old human cells when subjected to the Yamanaka factors, might rejuvenate and become nearly indistinguishable from their younger counterparts.

=== Hypoimmunogenic pluripotent stem cells ===
A review published in 2025 examines the development of hypoimmunogenic pluripotent stem cells (hPSCs) using advanced genome editing techniques aimed at reducing the risk of immune rejection in allogeneic cell therapy. These hPSCs are engineered to lack expression of major histocompatibility complex (MHC) class I and II molecules, while expressing immune-modulatory genes such as PD-L1, CD47, and HLA-G. This combination enhances immune evasion and supports the concept of universal donor cells that do not require human leukocyte antigen (HLA) matching. The integration of suicide gene systems, such as inducible Caspase-9, further enhances safety by enabling the selective elimination of cells in the event of malignancy. These strategies are intended to improve the safety, scalability, and accessibility of regenerative treatments.

== See also ==
- Stem cell treatments
- Stimulus-triggered acquisition of pluripotency cell, a now-discredited claim of pluripotent stem cell generation by immersing cells in an acid
- Dedifferentiation
- Directed differentiation
- Pluripotency
