= Genetically modified mouse =

Mouse with altered genomes

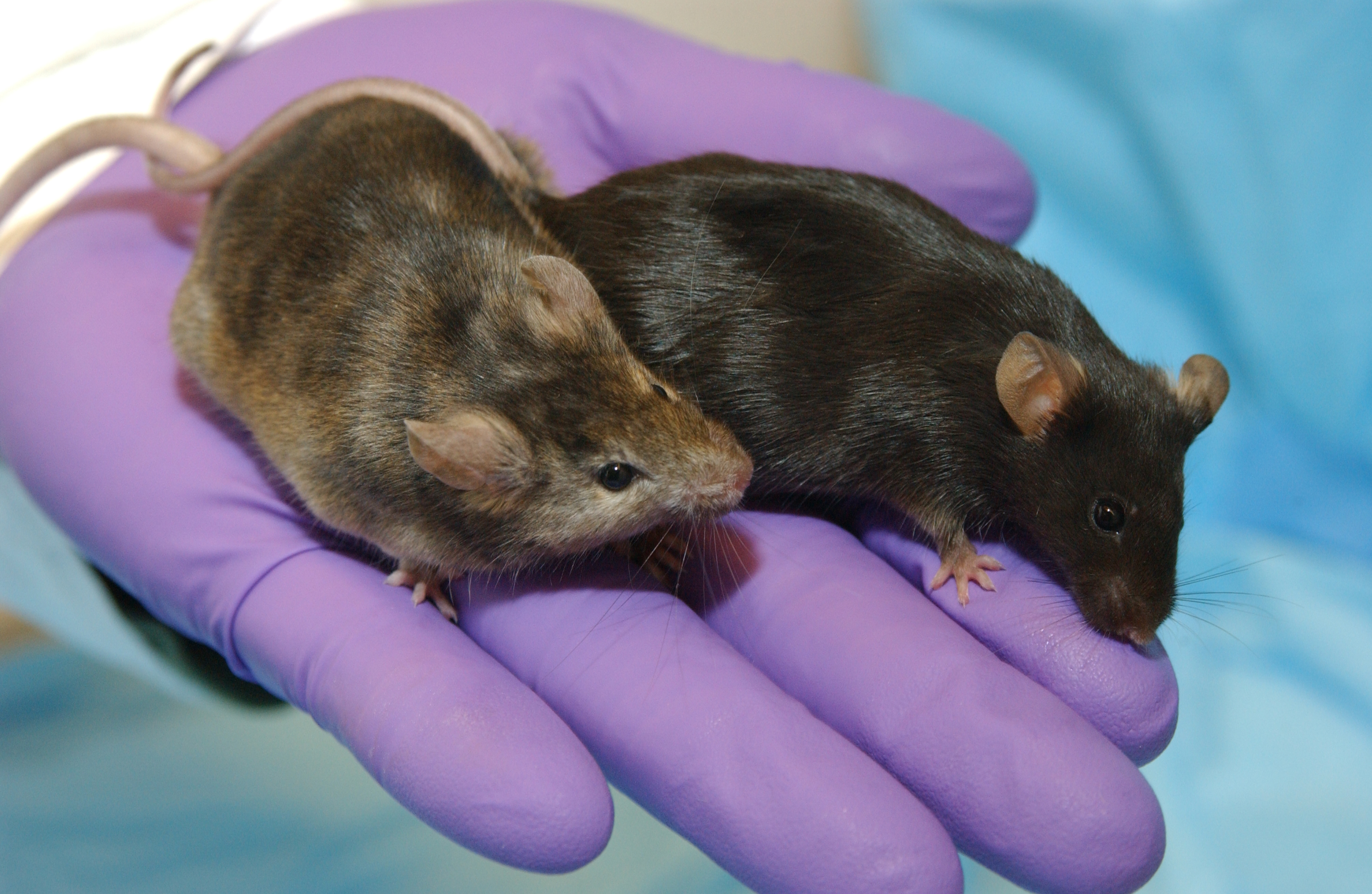
The genetically modified mouse in which a gene affecting hair growth has been knocked out (left) shown next to a normal lab mouse

A genetically modified mouse, genetically engineered mouse model (GEMM) or transgenic mouse is a mouse (Mus musculus) that has had its genome altered through the use of genetic engineering techniques. Genetically modified mice are commonly used for research or as animal models of human diseases and are also used for research on genes. Together with patient-derived xenografts (PDXs), GEMMs are the most common in vivo models in cancer research. The two approaches are considered complementary and may be used to recapitulate different aspects of disease. GEMMs are also of great interest for drug development, as they facilitate target validation and the study of response, resistance, toxicity and pharmacodynamics.

== History ==
In 1974, Beatrice Mintz and Rudolf Jaenisch created the first genetically modified animal by inserting a DNA virus into an early-stage mouse embryo and showing that the inserted genes were present in every cell. However, the mice did not pass the transgene to their offspring, and the impact and applicability of this experiment were, therefore, limited. In 1981 the laboratories of Frank Ruddle from Yale University, Frank Costantini and Elizabeth Lacy from Oxford, and Ralph L. Brinster and Richard Palmiter in collaboration from the University of Pennsylvania and the University of Washington injected purified DNA into a single-cell mouse embryo utilizing techniques developed by Brinster in the 1960s and 1970s, showing transmission of the genetic material to subsequent generations for the first time. During the 1980s, Palmiter and Brinster developed and led the field of transgenesis, refining methods of germline modification and using these techniques to elucidate the activity and function of genes in a way not possible before their unique approach.

== Methods ==
There are two basic technical approaches to producing genetically modified mice. The first involves pronuclear injection, a technique developed and refined by Ralph L. Brinster in the 1960s and 1970s, into a single cell of the mouse embryo, where it will randomly integrate into the mouse genome. This method creates a transgenic mouse and is used to insert new genetic information into the mouse genome or to over-express endogenous genes. The second approach, pioneered by Oliver Smithies and Mario Capecchi, involves modifying embryonic stem cells with a DNA construct containing DNA sequences homologous to the target gene. Embryonic stem cells that recombine with the genomic DNA are selected for, and they are then injected into the mice blastocysts or utilized in the Tetraploid complementation assay—an approach that eliminates the need for microinjection entirely. This method is used to manipulate a single gene, in most cases "knocking out" the target gene, although increasingly more subtle and complex genetic manipulation can occur (e.g. humanisation of a specific protein, or only changing single nucleotides). A humanised mouse can also be created by direct addition of human genes, thereby creating a murine form of human–animal hybrid. For example, genetically modified mice may be born with human leukocyte antigen genes in order to provide a more realistic environment when introducing human white blood cells into them in order to study immune system responses. One such application is the identification of hepatitis C virus (HCV) peptides that bind to HLA, and that can be recognized by the human immune system, thereby potentially being targets for future vaccines against HCV.

== Uses ==
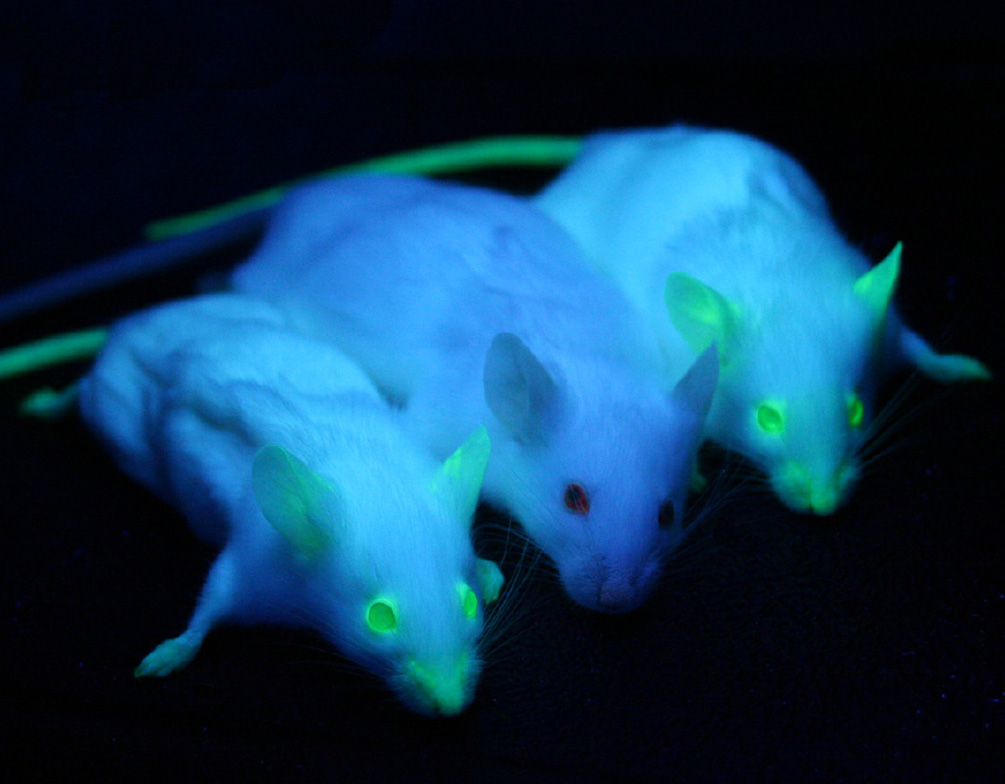
Transgenic mice expressing green fluorescent protein, which glows green under blue light. The central mouse is wild-type.

Genetically modified mice are used extensively in research as models of human disease. Mice are a useful model for genetic manipulation and research, as their tissues and organs are similar to that of a human, and they carry virtually all the same genes that operate in humans. They also have advantages over other mammals regarding research, in that they are available in hundreds of genetically homogeneous strains. Also, due to their size, they can be kept and housed in large numbers, reducing the cost of research and experiments. Transgenic mice are found in two main models of either loss or gain of function. The most common type is loss of function mice or the knockout mouse, where the activity of a single (or in some cases multiple) gene is removed or silenced. Gain of function mice, on the other hand, overexpress a specific gene. They have been used to study and model obesity, heart disease, diabetes, arthritis, substance abuse, anxiety, aging, temperature, pain reception, and Parkinson's disease. Genetically modified mice can further be divided into the constitutive mouse model, in which the target gene is permanently activated or inactivated in all the cells of the animal, or the conditional mouse model, in which the knockout or the overexpressed gene can be regulated in a spatiotemporal manner, which enables targeting of a specific type or subset of cells in the animal from a specific time in the life of the animal.

Transgenic mice generated to carry cloned oncogenes and knockout mice lacking tumor-suppressing genes have provided good models for human cancer. Hundreds of these oncomice have been developed covering a wide range of cancers affecting most organs of the body, and they are being refined to become more representative of human cancer. The disease symptoms and potential drugs or treatments can be tested against these mouse models.

A mouse has been genetically engineered to have increased muscle growth and strength by overexpressing the insulin-like growth factor I (IGF-I) in differentiated muscle fibers. Another mouse has had a gene altered that is involved in glucose metabolism and runs faster, lives longer, is more sexually active and eats more without getting fatter than the average mouse (see Metabolic supermice). Another mouse had the TRPM8 receptor blocked or removed in a study involving capsaicin and menthol. With the TRPM8 receptor removed, the mouse was unable to detect small changes in temperature and the pain associated with it.

Great care should be taken when deciding how to use genetically modified mice in research. Even basic issues like choosing the correct "wild-type" control mouse to use for comparison are sometimes overlooked.

== Advantages and limitations ==
Genetically modified mice are essential tools in biomedical and pharmacological research, as they allow for the validation of specific genes. These models facilitate the discovery of new therapeutic targets and help better predict treatment responses, thereby reducing the risk of failure in clinical trials. However, there are important limitations: these mice do not always faithfully reproduce the complexity of human pathologies, results obtained in mice do not always translate directly to humans, and biological differences between species can complicate data interpretation.

== See also ==
- Humanized mouse
- CRISPR-Cas9
- Animal models
- Cre-Lox
- Gene editing
- Tetraploid complementation assay
