= IGFBP2 =

Protein-coding gene in the species Homo sapiens

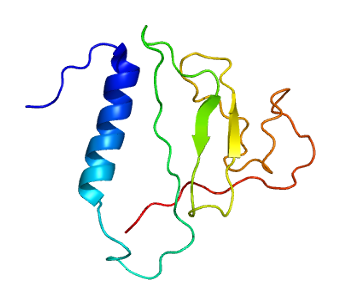

Identifiers
- Aliases: IGFBP2, IBP2, IGF-BP53, insulin like growth factor binding protein 2
- External IDs: OMIM: 146731; MGI: 96437; GeneCards: IGFBP2
Available structures
PDB	Ortholog search: PDBe RCSB
PDB	List of PDB id codes 2H7T

Gene location (Human)
Chr.	Chromosome 2 (human)
Band	2q35	Start	216,632,828 bp
Band	2q35	End	216,664,436 bp

Gene location (Mouse)
Chr.	Chromosome 1 (mouse)
Band	1 C3|1 36.94 cM	Start	72,863,662 bp
Band	1 C3|1 36.94 cM	End	72,891,633 bp
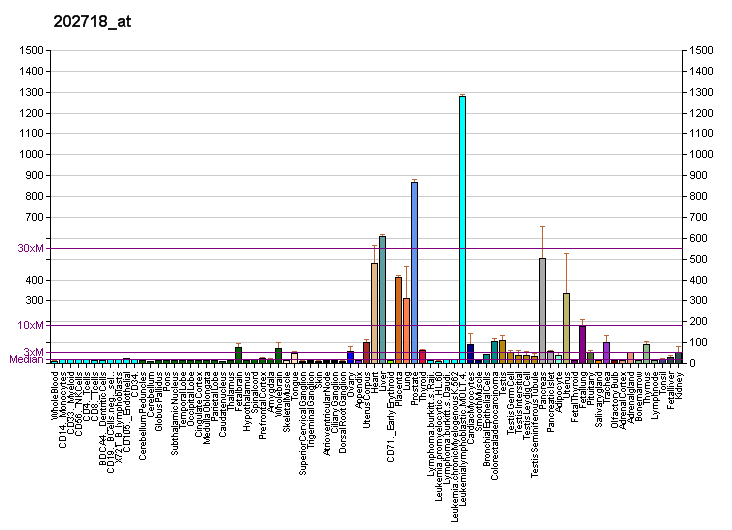
RNA expression pattern
Bgee	Human / Mouse (ortholog); Top expressed in: Descending thoracic aorta; ascending aorta; decidua; right coronary artery; body of stomach; ventricular zone; ganglionic eminence; olfactory zone of nasal mucosa; epithelium of bronchus; bronchial epithelial cell / Top expressed in: choroid plexus of fourth ventricle; calvaria; vestibular sensory epithelium; Epithelium of choroid plexus; corneal stroma; efferent ductule; optic nerve; transitional epithelium of urinary bladder; left lobe of liver; molar; More reference expression data
BioGPS	More reference expression data
Gene ontology
Molecular function	insulin-like growth factor binding; growth factor binding; insulin-like growth factor I binding; insulin-like growth factor II binding; protein binding; signaling receptor binding
Cellular component	extracellular region; apical plasma membrane; extracellular exosome; cytoplasmic vesicle; extracellular space
Biological process	response to estradiol; response to retinoic acid; response to nutrient; female pregnancy; response to steroid hormone; response to mechanical stimulus; ageing; response to glucocorticoid; response to lithium ion; response to estrogen; regulation of insulin-like growth factor receptor signaling pathway; cellular response to hormone stimulus; regulation of cell growth; regulation of growth; negative regulation of canonical Wnt signaling pathway; signal transduction; positive regulation of activated T cell proliferation
Sources:Amigo / QuickGO
Orthologs
Databases	NCBI: entry; OMA: entry
Species	Human	Mouse
Entrez	3485	16008
Ensembl	ENSG00000115457	ENSMUSG00000039323
UniProt	P18065	P47877
RefSeq (mRNA)	NM_001313990; NM_001313992; NM_001313993; NM_000597	NM_008342; NM_001310659
RefSeq (protein)	NP_000588; NP_001300919; NP_001300921; NP_001300922	NP_001297588; NP_032368
Location (UCSC)	Chr 2: 216.63 – 216.66 Mb	Chr 1: 72.86 – 72.89 Mb
PubMed search
- Wikidata
View/Edit Human	View/Edit Mouse

Insulin-like growth factor-binding protein 2 is a protein that in humans is encoded by the IGFBP2 gene.
