= LIN28A =

Protein-coding gene in humans

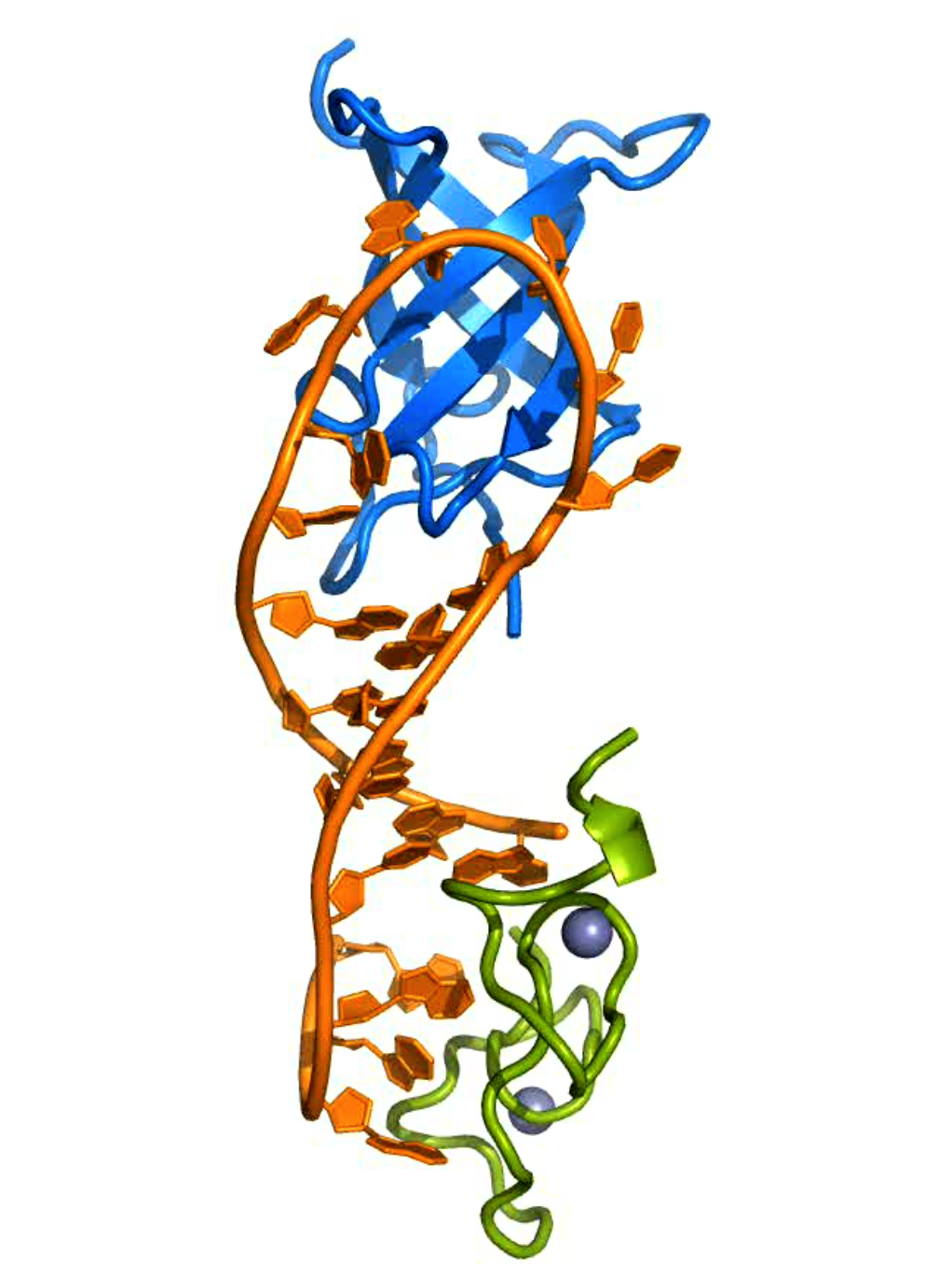

Identifiers
- Aliases: LIN28A, CSDD1, LIN-28, LIN28, ZCCHC1, lin-28A, lin-28 homolog A, Lin28a, LIN28A (gene), Lin-28 homolog A
- External IDs: OMIM: 611043; MGI: 1890546; GeneCards: LIN28A
Available structures
PDB	Ortholog search: PDBe RCSB
PDB	List of PDB id codes 2CQF, 2LI8

Gene location (Human)
Chr.	Chromosome 1 (human)
Band	1p36.11	Start	26,410,817 bp
Band	1p36.11	End	26,429,728 bp

Gene location (Mouse)
Chr.	Chromosome 4 (mouse)
Band	4|4 D2.3	Start	133,730,641 bp
Band	4|4 D2.3	End	133,746,152 bp
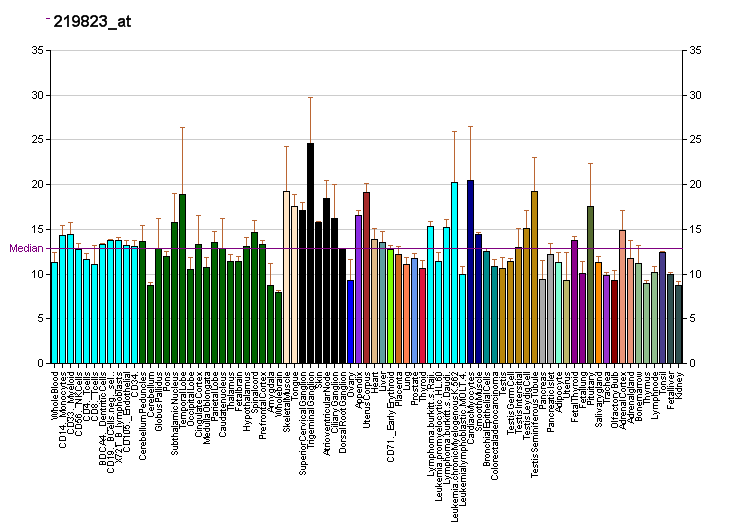
RNA expression pattern
Bgee	Human / Mouse (ortholog); Top expressed in: oocyte; secondary oocyte; sperm; gonad; buccal mucosa cell; testicle; left testis; right testis; embryo; Achilles tendon / Top expressed in: primitive streak; tail of embryo; epiblast; otic placode; somite; otic vesicle; yolk sac; zygote; granulocyte; secondary oocyte; More reference expression data
BioGPS	More reference expression data
Gene ontology
Molecular function	DNA binding; zinc ion binding; metal ion binding; protein binding; RNA binding; nucleic acid binding; translation initiation factor binding; mRNA binding; G-quadruplex RNA binding; miRNA binding; sequence-specific mRNA binding; polysome binding
Cellular component	cytoplasm; cytosol; nucleolus; nucleus; endoplasmic reticulum; rough endoplasmic reticulum; polysome; P-body; cytoplasmic stress granule; ribonucleoprotein complex
Biological process	regulation of gene silencing by miRNA; germ cell development; miRNA catabolic process; regulation of transcription, DNA-templated; RNA 3'-end processing; somatic stem cell population maintenance; negative regulation of glial cell differentiation; positive regulation of translation; stem cell differentiation; positive regulation of cell proliferation involved in kidney development; stem cell population maintenance; pre-miRNA processing; positive regulation of neuron differentiation; miRNA metabolic process; gene silencing; negative regulation of translation; positive regulation of TOR signaling; positive regulation of protein kinase B signaling; cellular response to glucose stimulus; positive regulation of production of miRNAs involved in gene silencing by miRNA; positive regulation of cytoplasmic translation
Sources:Amigo / QuickGO
Orthologs
Databases	NCBI: entry; OMA: entry
Species	Human	Mouse
Entrez	79727	83557
Ensembl	ENSG00000131914	ENSMUSG00000050966
UniProt	Q9H9Z2	Q8K3Y3
RefSeq (mRNA)	NM_024674	NM_145833
RefSeq (protein)	NP_078950	NP_665832
Location (UCSC)	Chr 1: 26.41 – 26.43 Mb	Chr 4: 133.73 – 133.75 Mb
PubMed search
- Wikidata
View/Edit Human	View/Edit Mouse

Lin-28 homolog A is a protein that in humans is encoded by the LIN28 gene.

LIN28 encodes an RNA-binding protein that binds to and enhances the translation of the IGF-2 (insulin-like growth factor 2) mRNA. Lin28 binds to the let-7 pre-microRNA and blocks production of the mature let-7 microRNA in mouse embryonic stem cells. In pluripotent embryonal carcinoma cells, LIN28 is localized in the ribosomes, P-bodies and stress granules.

== Structure ==
Models of Lin28/let-7 complexes obtained through X-ray crystallography and NMR reveal that two folded domains of Lin28 recognize two distinct RNA regions. The domains are sufficient for inhibition of let-7 in vivo.

== Function ==
=== Stem cell expression ===
LIN28 is thought to regulate the self-renewal of stem cells. In Caenorhabditis elegans, there is only one Lin28 gene that is expressed and in vertebrates, there are two paralogs present, Lin28a and Lin28b. In nematodes, the LIN28 homolog lin-28 is a heterochronic gene that determines the onset of early larval stages of developmental events in C. elegans, by regulating the self-renewal of nematode stem cells in the skin (called seam cells) and vulva (called VPCs) during development. In mice, LIN28 is highly expressed in mouse embryonic stem cells and during early embryogenesis.

LIN28 is highly expressed in human embryonic stem cells and can enhance the efficiency of the formation of induced pluripotent stem (iPS) cells from human fibroblasts.

=== Puberty ===
LIN28 overexpression in mice can cause gigantism and a delay in puberty onset, consistent with human genome-wide association studies suggesting that polymorphisms in the human LIN28B gene are associated with human height and puberty timing. Mutations in LIN28B are associated with precocious puberty.

LIN28 can regulate glucose homeostasis in mammals by increasing insulin-PI3K-mTOR signaling and insulin sensitivity, thereby promoting resistance to high fat diet-induced obesity and type 2 diabetes. Aberrant expression of LIN28 has been seen to regulate aerobic glycolysis to facilitate cancer proliferation

=== Tissue regeneration ===
Mice genetically altered to produce LIN28 during their lifespan showed improved hair growth and healthy tissue regeneration on added puncture wounds in later life stages. While the mice could regenerate limbs, they could not repair damaged heart tissue. Appropriate drugs replicated the regeneration in unaltered mice, using the same metabolic paths. The drugs increased the subjects' metabolic rates, evidently causing the body to heal at higher rates. The effects of Lin28a activation faded with age.

== Applications ==
LIN28 is a marker of undifferentiated human embryonic stem cells and has been used to enhance the efficiency of the formation of iPS cells from human fibroblasts.
