= MHC class II transactivator =

Protein-coding gene in humans

CIITA

Identifiers
- Aliases: CIITA, C2TA, CIITAIV, MHC2TA, NLRA, class II, major histocompatibility complex, transactivator, class II major histocompatibility complex transactivator
- External IDs: OMIM: 600005; MGI: 108445; GeneCards: CIITA
Enzyme activity
EC #	BRENDA	ExPASy	KEGG	MetaCyc
2.7.11.1	↗	↗	↗	↗

Gene location (Human)
Chr.	Chromosome 16 (human)
Band	16p13.13	Start	10,866,222 bp
Band	16p13.13	End	10,943,021 bp

Gene location (Mouse)
Chr.	Chromosome 16 (mouse)
Band	16|16 A1	Start	10,297,923 bp
Band	16|16 A1	End	10,346,282 bp
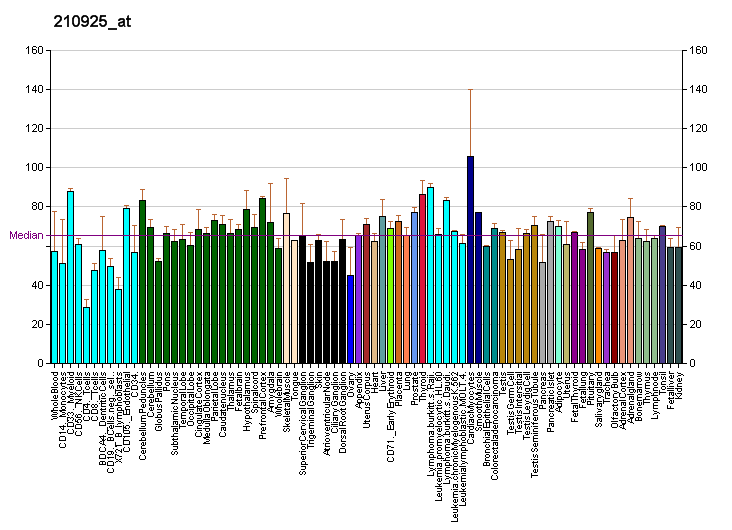

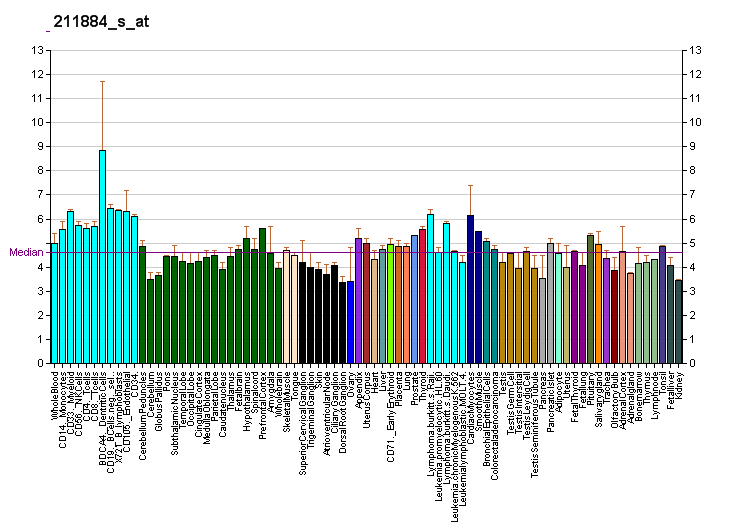
RNA expression pattern
Bgee	Human / Mouse (ortholog); Top expressed in: monocyte; granulocyte; appendix; spleen; lymph node; sural nerve; gallbladder; upper lobe of left lung; blood; apex of heart / Top expressed in: mesenteric lymph nodes; spleen; blood; thymus; lumbar subsegment of spinal cord; subcutaneous adipose tissue; duodenum; morula; right kidney; lip; More reference expression data
BioGPS	More reference expression data
Gene ontology
Molecular function	transferase activity; DNA binding; nucleotide binding; transcription coactivator activity; GTP binding; kinase activity; protein C-terminus binding; protein binding; acyltransferase activity; ATP binding; protein-containing complex binding
Cellular component	PML body; nucleoplasm; nucleus
Biological process	positive regulation of MHC class II biosynthetic process; regulation of transcription, DNA-templated; response to interferon-gamma; phosphorylation; interferon-gamma-mediated signaling pathway; response to antibiotic; negative regulation of transcription by RNA polymerase II; transcription, DNA-templated; positive regulation of transcription, DNA-templated; immune response; negative regulation of transcription, DNA-templated; positive regulation of MHC class I biosynthetic process; negative regulation of collagen biosynthetic process; positive regulation of transcription by RNA polymerase II; inflammatory response
Sources:Amigo / QuickGO
Orthologs
Databases	NCBI: entry; OMA: entry
Species	Human	Mouse
Entrez	4261	12265
Ensembl	ENSG00000179583	ENSMUSG00000022504
UniProt	P33076	P79621
RefSeq (mRNA)	NM_000246; NM_001286402; NM_001286403; NM_001379330; NM_001379331 NM_001379332; NM_001379333; NM_001379334	NM_001243760; NM_001243761; NM_007575; NM_001302618; NM_001302619
RefSeq (protein)	NP_000237; NP_001273331; NP_001273332; NP_001366259; NP_001366260 NP_001366261; NP_001366262; NP_001366263	NP_001230689; NP_001230690; NP_001289547; NP_001289548; NP_031601
Location (UCSC)	Chr 16: 10.87 – 10.94 Mb	Chr 16: 10.3 – 10.35 Mb
PubMed search
- Wikidata
View/Edit Human	View/Edit Mouse

MHC class II transactivator is a major histocompatibility complex protein encoded in the human by the gene CIITA. Mutations in this gene are responsible for the bare lymphocyte syndrome in which the immune system is severely compromised and cannot effectively fight infection. Chromosomal rearrangement of CIITA is involved in the pathogenesis of Hodgkin lymphoma and primary mediastinal B cell lymphoma.

== Function ==
CIITA mRNA can only be detected in human leukocyte antigen (HLA) system class II-positive cell lines and tissues. This highly restricted tissue distribution suggests that expression of HLA class II genes is to a large extent under the control of CIITA. However, CIITA does not appear to directly bind to DNA. Instead CIITA functions through activation of the transcription factor RFX5. Hence CIITA is classified as a transcriptional coactivator.

The CIITA protein contains an acidic transcriptional activation domain, 4 LRRs (leucine-rich repeats) and a GTP binding domain. The protein uses GTP binding to facilitate its own transport into the nucleus. Once in the nucleus, the protein acts as a positive regulator of class II major histocompatibility complex gene transcription, and is often referred to as the "master control factor" for the expression of these genes.

CIITA expression is induced by interferon gamma, possibly assisted by other signals. MHC II expression in intestinal epithelial cells is upregulated under inflammation.

== Interactions ==
CIITA has been shown to interact with:

- MAPK1,
- Nuclear receptor coactivator 1,
- RFX5,
- RFXANK,
- XPO1, and
- ZXDC.

== See also ==
- MHC class II
