= RFXAP =

Protein-coding gene in the species Homo sapiens

Identifiers
- Aliases: RFXAP, regulatory factor X associated protein
- External IDs: OMIM: 601861; MGI: 2180854; GeneCards: RFXAP
Available structures
PDB	Ortholog search: PDBe RCSB
PDB	List of PDB id codes 2KW3

Gene location (Human)
Chr.	Chromosome 13 (human)
Band	13q13.3	Start	36,819,222 bp
Band	13q13.3	End	36,829,104 bp

Gene location (Mouse)
Chr.	Chromosome 3 (mouse)
Band	3|3 C	Start	54,710,536 bp
Band	3|3 C	End	54,715,212 bp
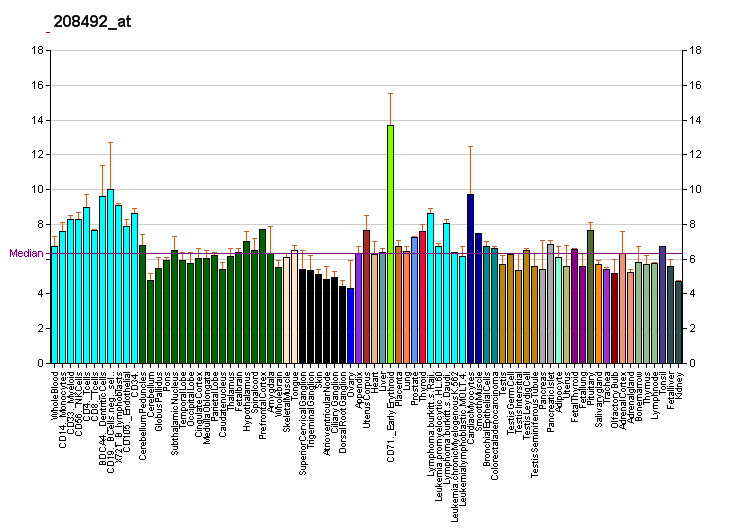

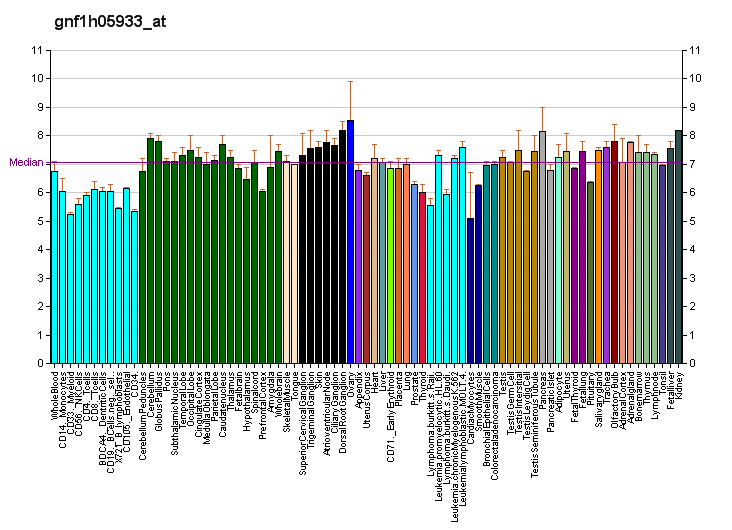
RNA expression pattern
Bgee	Human / Mouse (ortholog); Top expressed in: gonad; tendon of biceps brachii; testicle; ventricular zone; palpebral conjunctiva; mucosa of paranasal sinus; gastric mucosa; cerebellar hemisphere; right hemisphere of cerebellum; ganglionic eminence / Top expressed in: spermatocyte; ventricular zone; granulocyte; dentate gyrus of hippocampal formation granule cell; muscle of thigh; Paneth cell; thymus; neural layer of retina; right kidney; cerebellar cortex; More reference expression data
BioGPS	More reference expression data
Gene ontology
Molecular function	transcription coactivator activity; DNA-binding transcription factor activity; DNA binding
Cellular component	nucleus; nuclear speck
Biological process	positive regulation of transcription, DNA-templated
Sources:Amigo / QuickGO
Orthologs
Databases	NCBI: entry; OMA: entry
Species	Human	Mouse
Entrez	5994	170767
Ensembl	ENSG00000133111	ENSMUSG00000036615
UniProt	O00287	Q8VCG9
RefSeq (mRNA)	NM_000538	NM_133231
RefSeq (protein)	NP_000529	NP_573494
Location (UCSC)	Chr 13: 36.82 – 36.83 Mb	Chr 3: 54.71 – 54.72 Mb
PubMed search
- Wikidata
View/Edit Human	View/Edit Mouse

Regulatory factor X-associated protein is a protein that in humans is encoded by the RFXAP gene.

Major histocompatibility (MHC) class II molecules are transmembrane proteins that have a central role in development and control of the immune system. The protein encoded by this gene, along with regulatory factor X-associated ankyrin-containing protein and regulatory factor-5, forms a complex that binds to the X box motif of certain MHC class II gene promoters and activates their transcription. Once bound to the promoter, this complex associates with the non-DNA-binding factor MHC class II transactivator, which controls the cell type specificity and inducibility of MHC class II gene expression. Mutations in this gene have been linked to bare lymphocyte syndrome type II, complementation group D. Transcript variants utilizing different polyA signals have been found for this gene.

== Interactions ==
RFXAP has been shown to interact with RFXANK.
