= RFXANK =

Protein-coding gene in the species Homo sapiens

Identifiers
- Aliases: RFXANK, ANKRA1, BLS, F14150_1, RFX-B, regulatory factor X associated ankyrin containing protein
- External IDs: OMIM: 603200; MGI: 1333865; GeneCards: RFXANK
Available structures
PDB	Ortholog search: PDBe RCSB
PDB	List of PDB id codes 3UXG, 3V30, 4QQM

Gene location (Human)
Chr.	Chromosome 19 (human)
Band	19p13.11	Start	19,192,229 bp
Band	19p13.11	End	19,201,869 bp

Gene location (Mouse)
Chr.	Chromosome 8 (mouse)
Band	8|8 B3.3	Start	70,583,444 bp
Band	8|8 B3.3	End	70,591,804 bp
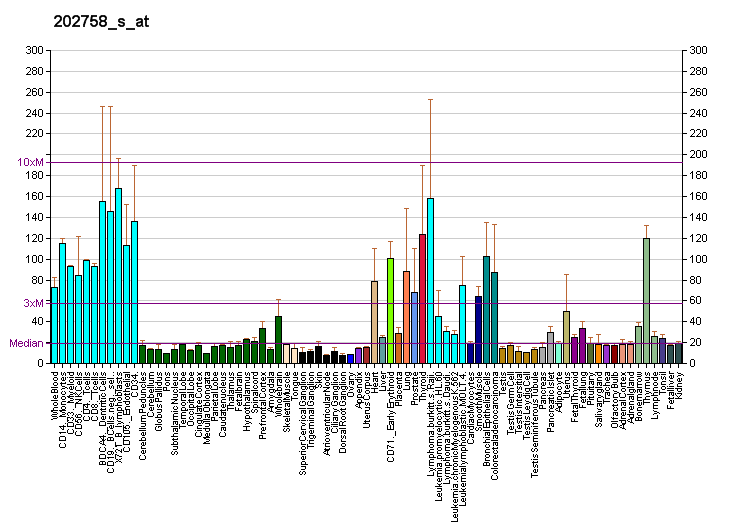
RNA expression pattern
Bgee	Human / Mouse (ortholog); Top expressed in: mucosa of transverse colon; right uterine tube; right lobe of thyroid gland; ventricular zone; left lobe of thyroid gland; olfactory zone of nasal mucosa; granulocyte; canal of the cervix; apex of heart; right ovary / Top expressed in: granulocyte; blood; interventricular septum; cardiac muscle tissue of left ventricle; gastric mucosa; duodenum; lumbar subsegment of spinal cord; epithelium of stomach; ventricular zone; brown adipose tissue; More reference expression data
BioGPS	More reference expression data
Gene ontology
Molecular function	DNA-binding transcription factor activity; DNA binding; transcription coregulator activity; histone deacetylase binding
Cellular component	nucleus; nucleoplasm; intercellular bridge; cytoplasm; cytosol
Biological process	regulation of transcription by RNA polymerase II; regulation of transcription, DNA-templated; transcription, DNA-templated; Ras protein signal transduction; positive regulation of transcription by RNA polymerase II
Sources:Amigo / QuickGO
Orthologs
Databases	NCBI: entry; OMA: entry
Species	Human	Mouse
Entrez	8625	19727
Ensembl	ENSG00000064490	ENSMUSG00000036120
UniProt	O14593	Q9Z205
RefSeq (mRNA)	NM_001278727; NM_001278728; NM_003721; NM_134440; NM_001370233 NM_001370234; NM_001370235; NM_001370236; NM_001370237; NM_001370238	NM_001025589; NM_011266
RefSeq (protein)	NP_001265656; NP_001265657; NP_003712; NP_604389; NP_001357162 NP_001357163; NP_001357164; NP_001357165; NP_001357166; NP_001357167	NP_001020760; NP_035396
Location (UCSC)	Chr 19: 19.19 – 19.2 Mb	Chr 8: 70.58 – 70.59 Mb
PubMed search
- Wikidata
View/Edit Human	View/Edit Mouse

DNA-binding protein RFXANK is a protein that in humans is encoded by the RFXANK gene.

== Function ==
Major histocompatibility (MHC) class II molecules are transmembrane proteins that have a central role in development and control of the immune system. The protein encoded by this gene, along with regulatory factor X-associated protein and regulatory factor-5, forms a complex that binds to the Xbox motif of certain MHC class II gene promoters and activates their transcription. Once bound to the promoter, this complex associates with the non-DNA-binding factor MHC class II transactivator, which controls the cell type specificity and inducibility of MHC class II gene expression. This protein contains ankyrin repeats involved in protein-protein interactions. Mutations in this gene have been linked to bare lymphocyte syndrome type II, complementation group B. Two transcript variants encoding different isoforms have been described for this gene, with only one isoform showing activation activity.

== Interactions ==
RFXANK has been shown to interact with RFXAP and CIITA.
