= RFX5 =

Protein-coding gene in humans

Identifiers
- Aliases: RFX5, regulatory factor X5
- External IDs: OMIM: 601863; MGI: 1858421; GeneCards: RFX5
Available structures
| PDB | Ortholog search: PDBe RCSB |
| PDB | List of PDB id codes 2KW3, 3V30 |

Gene location (Human)
| Chr. | Chromosome 1 (human) |
| Band | 1q21.3 | Start | 151,340,640 bp |
| Band | 1q21.3 | End | 151,347,357 bp |

Gene location (Mouse)
| Chr. | Chromosome 3 (mouse) |
| Band | 3 F2.1|3 40.74 cM | Start | 94,861,386 bp |
| Band | 3 F2.1|3 40.74 cM | End | 94,868,872 bp |
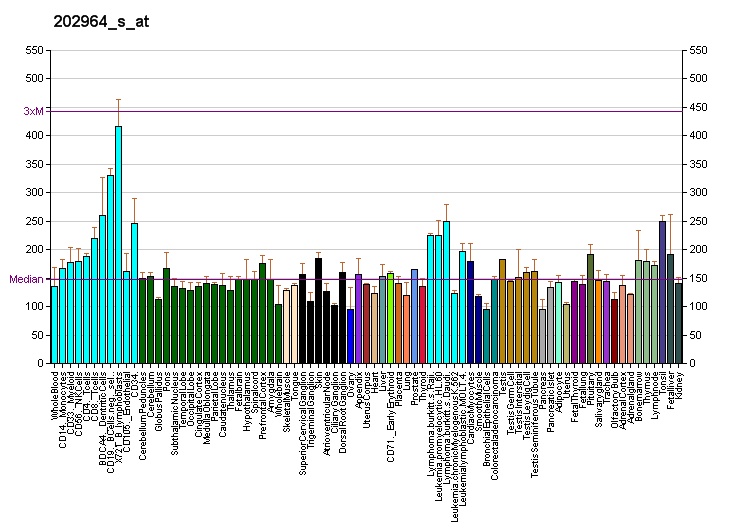

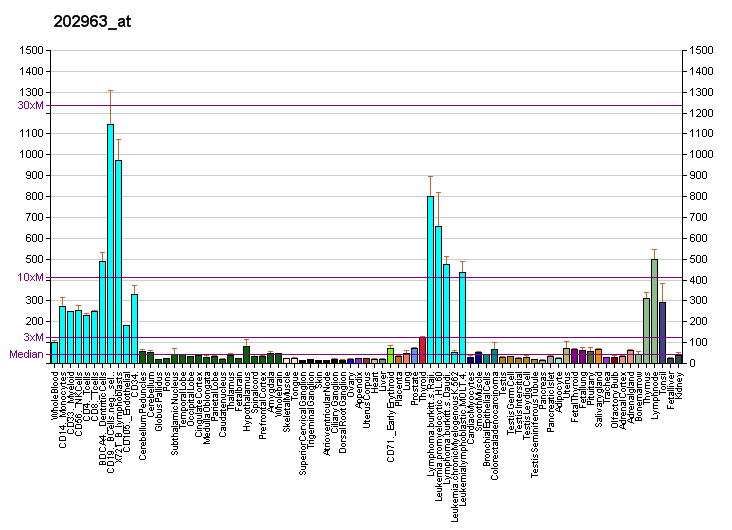
RNA expression pattern
| Bgee | Human / Mouse (ortholog); Top expressed in: epithelium of nasopharynx; lymph node; monocyte; appendix; granulocyte; right adrenal cortex; rectum; tonsil; spleen; pons / Top expressed in: Scarpa's ganglion; secondary oocyte; ciliary body; primary oocyte; substantia nigra; zygote; retinal pigment epithelium; Paneth cell; neural layer of retina; medullary collecting duct; More reference expression data |
| BioGPS | More reference expression data |
Gene ontology
| Molecular function | DNA-binding transcription factor activity; RNA polymerase II cis-regulatory region sequence-specific DNA binding; DNA binding; protein binding; DNA-binding transcription activator activity, RNA polymerase II-specific; sequence-specific DNA binding; DNA-binding transcription factor activity, RNA polymerase II-specific |
| Cellular component | nucleus |
| Biological process | regulation of transcription, DNA-templated; negative regulation of transcription by RNA polymerase II; transcription, DNA-templated; regulation of transcription by RNA polymerase II; transcription by RNA polymerase II; positive regulation of transcription by RNA polymerase II |
Sources:Amigo / QuickGO
Orthologs
| Databases | NCBI: entry; OMA: entry |
| Species | Human | Mouse |
| Entrez | 5993 | 53970 |
| Ensembl | ENSG00000143390 | ENSMUSG00000005774 |
| UniProt | P48382 | Q9JL61 |
| RefSeq (mRNA) | NM_000449; NM_001025603 | NM_017395; NM_001355705; NM_001355706; NM_001355707; NM_001025601 |
| RefSeq (protein) | NP_000440; NP_001020774; NP_001366341; NP_001366342; NP_001366343 NP_001366344; NP_001366345; NP_001366346; NP_001366347; NP_001366348; NP_001366349 | NP_059091; NP_001342634; NP_001342635; NP_001342636 |
| Location (UCSC) | Chr 1: 151.34 – 151.35 Mb | Chr 3: 94.86 – 94.87 Mb |
| PubMed search |
- Wikidata
| View/Edit Human | View/Edit Mouse |

DNA-binding protein RFX5 is a protein that in humans is encoded by the RFX5 gene.

== Function ==
A lack of MHC-II expression results in a severe immunodeficiency syndrome called MHC-II deficiency, or the bare lymphocyte syndrome (BLS; MIM 209920). At least 4 complementation groups have been identified in B-cell lines established from patients with BLS. The molecular defects in complementation groups B, C, and D all lead to a deficiency in RFX, a nuclear protein complex that binds to the Xbox of MHC-II promoters. The lack of RFX binding activity in complementation group C results from mutations in the RFX5 gene encoding the 75-kD subunit of RFX (Steimle et al., 1995). RFX5 is the fifth member of the growing family of DNA-binding proteins sharing a novel and highly characteristic DNA-binding domain called the RFX motif. Multiple alternatively spliced transcript variants have been found but the full-length natures of only two have been determined.

== Interactions ==
RFX5 has been shown to interact with CIITA.
