= Cold-shock domain =

Protein domain

CSD
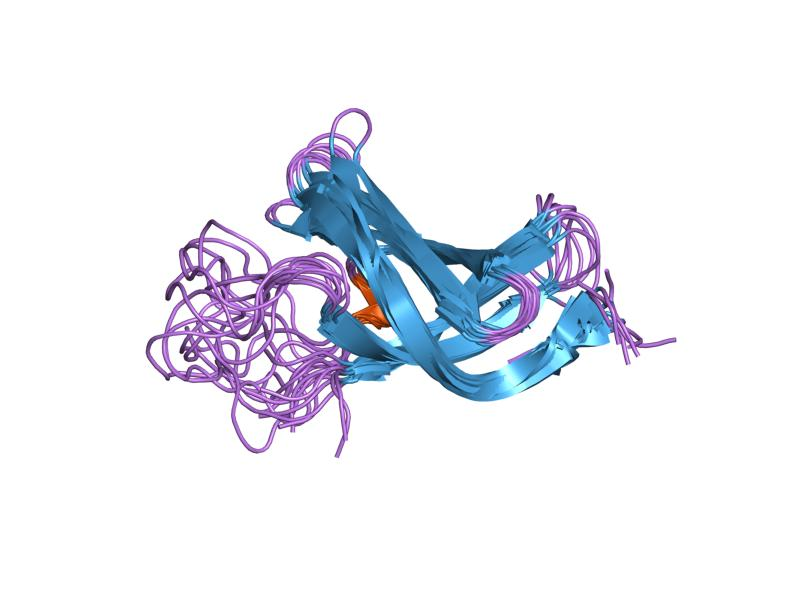
- solution structure of the single-stranded dna-binding cold shock domain (csd) of human y-box protein 1 (yb1) determined by nmr (10 lowest energy structures)

Identifiers
- Symbol: CSD
- Pfam: PF00313
- Pfam clan: CL0021
- InterPro: IPR002059
- PROSITE: PDOC00304
- SCOP2: 1mjc / SCOPe / SUPFAM
- CDD: cd04458
Available protein structures:
- PDB: IPR002059 PF00313 (ECOD; PDBsum)
- AlphaFold: IPR002059; PF00313

In molecular biology, the cold-shock domain (CSD) is a protein domain of about 70 amino acids which has been found in prokaryotic and eukaryotic DNA-binding proteins. Part of this domain is highly similar to the RNP-1 RNA-binding motif.

When Escherichia coli is exposed to a temperature drop from 37 to 10 degrees Celsius, a 4–5 hour lag phase occurs, after which growth is resumed at a reduced rate. During the lag phase, the expression of around 13 proteins, which contain cold shock domains is increased 2–10 fold. These so-called cold shock proteins induced in the cold shock response are thought to help the cell to survive in temperatures lower than optimum growth temperature, by contrast with heat shock proteins induced in the heat shock response, which help the cell to survive in temperatures greater than the optimum, possibly by condensation of the chromosome and organisation of the prokaryotic nucleoid.
