= MYC =

Protein-coding gene in the species Homo sapiens

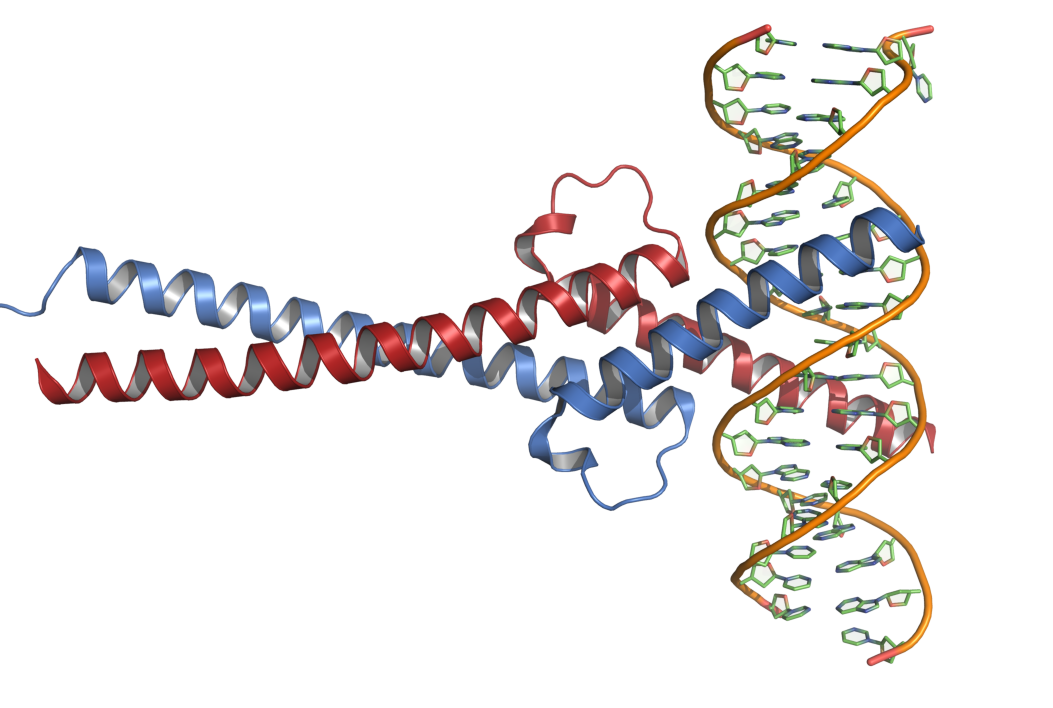

Identifiers
- Aliases: MYC, MRTL, MYCC, bHLHe39, c-Myc, v-myc avian myelocytomatosis viral oncogene homolog, MYC proto-oncogene, bHLH transcription factor, Genes, myc, c-myc
- External IDs: OMIM: 190080; MGI: 97250; GeneCards: MYC
Available structures
PDB	Ortholog search: PDBe RCSB
PDB	List of PDB id codes 1A93, 1EE4, 1MV0, 1NKP, 2A93, 2OR9, 4Y7R

Gene location (Human)
Chr.	Chromosome 8 (human)
Band	8q24.21	Start	127,735,434 bp
Band	8q24.21	End	127,742,951 bp

Gene location (Mouse)
Chr.	Chromosome 15 (mouse)
Band	15 D1|15 26.19 cM	Start	61,857,240 bp
Band	15 D1|15 26.19 cM	End	61,862,223 bp
RNA expression pattern
Bgee	Human / Mouse (ortholog); Top expressed in: skin of thigh; vena cava; left uterine tube; skin of abdomen; gastric mucosa; human penis; mucosa of urinary bladder; pericardium; gallbladder; cartilage tissue / Top expressed in: tail of embryo; genital tubercle; lumbar spinal ganglion; lip; Dermatocranium; embryo; yolk sac; thymus; endothelial cell of lymphatic vessel; morula; More reference expression data
BioGPS	n/a
Gene ontology
Molecular function	DNA binding; protein dimerization activity; DNA-binding transcription factor activity; DNA-binding transcription activator activity, RNA polymerase II-specific; transcription factor binding; RNA polymerase II cis-regulatory region sequence-specific DNA binding; E-box binding; protein binding; protein-containing complex binding; DNA-binding transcription factor activity, RNA polymerase II-specific; DNA-binding transcription repressor activity, RNA polymerase II-specific
Cellular component	nucleoplasm; nucleolus; nucleus; protein-containing complex
Biological process	Notch signaling pathway; chromatin remodeling; negative regulation of monocyte differentiation; positive regulation of metanephric cap mesenchymal cell proliferation; regulation of transcription, DNA-templated; regulation of telomere maintenance; positive regulation of epithelial cell proliferation; positive regulation of fibroblast proliferation; cellular response to UV; oxygen transport; negative regulation of apoptotic process; negative regulation of transcription by RNA polymerase II; chromosome organization; MAPK cascade; cellular response to DNA damage stimulus; positive regulation of cysteine-type endopeptidase activity involved in apoptotic process; branching involved in ureteric bud morphogenesis; negative regulation of cell division; fibroblast apoptotic process; positive regulation of mesenchymal cell proliferation; positive regulation of response to DNA damage stimulus; positive regulation of cell population proliferation; positive regulation of DNA biosynthetic process; regulation of gene expression; canonical Wnt signaling pathway; negative regulation of stress-activated MAPK cascade; energy reserve metabolic process; response to growth factor; response to gamma radiation; negative regulation of fibroblast proliferation; positive regulation of transcription by RNA polymerase II; cellular iron ion homeostasis; beta-catenin-TCF complex assembly; transcription, DNA-templated; transcription by RNA polymerase II; regulation of transcription by RNA polymerase II; protein deubiquitination; positive regulation of transcription, DNA-templated; positive regulation of telomerase activity; positive regulation of gene expression; protein-DNA complex disassembly; ERK1 and ERK2 cascade; cellular response to hypoxia; G1/S transition of mitotic cell cycle; cytokine-mediated signaling pathway; positive regulation of DNA methylation
Sources:Amigo / QuickGO
Orthologs
Databases	NCBI: entry; OMA: entry
Species	Human	Mouse
Entrez	4609	17869
Ensembl	ENSG00000136997	ENSMUSG00000022346
UniProt	P01106	P01108
RefSeq (mRNA)	NM_002467; NM_001354870	NM_001177352; NM_001177353; NM_001177354; NM_010849
RefSeq (protein)	NP_002458; NP_001341799	NP_001170823; NP_001170824; NP_001170825; NP_034979
Location (UCSC)	Chr 8: 127.74 – 127.74 Mb	Chr 15: 61.86 – 61.86 Mb
PubMed search
- Wikidata
View/Edit Human	View/Edit Mouse

MYC proto-oncogene, bHLH transcription factor is a protein that in humans is encoded by the MYC gene which is a member of the Myc family of transcription factors. The protein contains basic helix-loop-helix (bHLH) structural motif.

== Function ==
This gene is a proto-oncogene and encodes a nuclear phosphoprotein that plays a role in cell cycle progression, apoptosis and cellular transformation. The encoded protein forms a heterodimer with the related transcription factor MAX. This complex binds to the E box DNA consensus sequence and regulates the transcription of specific target genes. Amplification of this gene is frequently observed in numerous human cancers. Translocations involving this gene are associated with Burkitt lymphoma and multiple myeloma in human patients. There is evidence to show that translation initiates both from an upstream, in-frame non-AUG (CUG) and a downstream AUG start site, resulting in the production of two isoforms with distinct N-termini. [provided by RefSeq, Aug 2017].

== As a drug target ==
Under normal circumstances, c-Myc through its bHLHZip domain heterodimerizes with other transcription factors such as MAD, MAX, and MNT. Myc/Max dimers activate gene transcription, while Mad/Max and Mnt/Max dimers inhibit the activity of Myc. c-MYC is over expressed in the majority of human cancers and in cancers where it is overexpressed, it drives proliferation of cancer cells.

A recombinant form of c-Myc called Omomyc in which four residues are mutated has been produced. Omomyc heterodimerizes with c-Myc and inhibits c-Myc transcriptional activity. When the mouse cancer cell line NIH3T3 is treated with Omomyc, it inhibits proliferation. In a mouse model of cancer in which cancer cells were genetically engineered to conditionally express Omomyc, Omomyc triggered tumor regression which was accompanied by reduced proliferation and increased apoptosis of the tumor tissue.

The Omomyc displays high affinity for MAX (Myc-associated protein X) and for enhancer box element CACGTG DNA sequences, that result in the uncoupling of cellular proliferation from normal growth factor regulation and contribute to many of the phenotypic hallmarks of cancer.

The recombinantly produced Omomyc miniprotein has been developed as a drug (OMO-103) and is currently in clinical trials.
