= Carbohydrate-responsive element-binding protein =

Protein found in humans

MLXIPL

Identifiers
- Aliases: MLXIPL, CHREBP, MIO, MONDOB, WBSCR14, WS-bHLH, bHLHd14, MLX interacting protein like, MLX
- External IDs: OMIM: 605678; MGI: 1927999; GeneCards: MLXIPL
Available structures
PDB	Ortholog search: PDBe RCSB
PDB	List of PDB id codes 4GNT

Gene location (Human)
Chr.	Chromosome 7 (human)
Band	7q11.23	Start	73,593,194 bp
Band	7q11.23	End	73,624,543 bp

Gene location (Mouse)
Chr.	Chromosome 5 (mouse)
Band	5|5 G2	Start	135,118,744 bp
Band	5|5 G2	End	135,167,236 bp
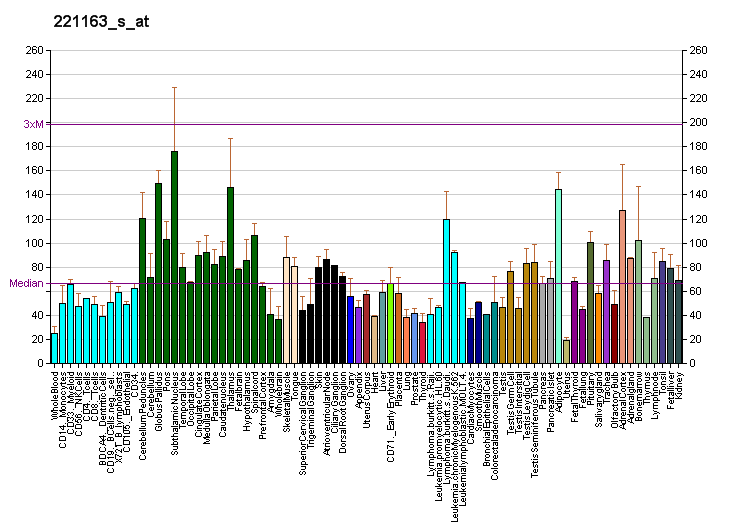
RNA expression pattern
Bgee	Human / Mouse (ortholog); Top expressed in: right lobe of liver; left adrenal cortex; right adrenal gland; right adrenal cortex; right hemisphere of cerebellum; subcutaneous adipose tissue; gastric mucosa; gastrocnemius muscle; right testis; muscle of thigh / Top expressed in: crypt of lieberkuhn of small intestine; left lobe of liver; brown adipose tissue; islet of Langerhans; muscle of thigh; proximal tubule; zygote; soleus muscle; right kidney; skeletal muscle tissue; More reference expression data
BioGPS	More reference expression data
Gene ontology
Molecular function	carbohydrate response element binding; DNA binding; protein dimerization activity; protein homodimerization activity; DNA-binding transcription factor activity; transcription factor binding; RNA polymerase II cis-regulatory region sequence-specific DNA binding; DNA-binding transcription repressor activity, RNA polymerase II-specific; protein heterodimerization activity; DNA-binding transcription factor activity, RNA polymerase II-specific
Cellular component	transcription regulator complex; nucleoplasm; nucleus; cytoplasm; cytosol
Biological process	intracellular signal transduction; positive regulation of lipid biosynthetic process; regulation of transcription, DNA-templated; glucose homeostasis; regulation of transcription by RNA polymerase II; anatomical structure morphogenesis; negative regulation of transcription by RNA polymerase II; positive regulation of fatty acid biosynthetic process; transcription, DNA-templated; positive regulation of transcription, DNA-templated; fatty acid homeostasis; positive regulation of cell population proliferation; negative regulation of peptidyl-serine phosphorylation; glucose mediated signaling pathway; negative regulation of oxidative phosphorylation; negative regulation of transcription, DNA-templated; positive regulation of glycolytic process; triglyceride homeostasis; positive regulation of transcription by RNA polymerase II; cellular response to carbohydrate stimulus; energy homeostasis
Sources:Amigo / QuickGO
Orthologs
Databases	NCBI: entry; OMA: entry
Species	Human	Mouse
Entrez	51085	58805
Ensembl	ENSG00000009950	ENSMUSG00000005373
UniProt	Q9NP71	Q99MZ3
RefSeq (mRNA)	NM_032951; NM_032952; NM_032953; NM_032954; NM_032994	NM_021455; NM_001359237
RefSeq (protein)	NP_116569; NP_116570; NP_116571; NP_116572	NP_067430; NP_001346166
Location (UCSC)	Chr 7: 73.59 – 73.62 Mb	Chr 5: 135.12 – 135.17 Mb
PubMed search
- Wikidata
View/Edit Human	View/Edit Mouse

Carbohydrate-responsive element-binding protein (ChREBP), also known as MLX-interacting protein-like (MLXIPL), MondoB, and WBSCR14, is a protein that in humans is encoded by the Mlxipl gene. ChREBP has two isoforms, ChREBP-α and ChREBP-β, which are encoded by the same gene using alternative promoters.

ChREBP is a member of the Mondo family and Myc / Max / Mad superfamily of transcription factors. The two main members of the Mondo family are MondoA (MLX-interacting protein or MLXIP) and ChREBP (MondoB, MLXIPL). Both are characterized by a basic helix-loop-helix leucine zipper (bHLH-ZIP) structure, and form heterodimers with MLX protein.

ChREBP is a sugar-sensing transcription factor, mediating genomic responses to carbohydrate availability in metabolic tissues such as liver and adipose tissue. ChREBP is crucial in nutrient sensing, glucose uptake and regulation of nutrient metabolism and energy homeostasis through metabolic processes such as glycolysis and lipogenesis. However, many of the mechanisms involved are not yet well understood.

== Structure ==
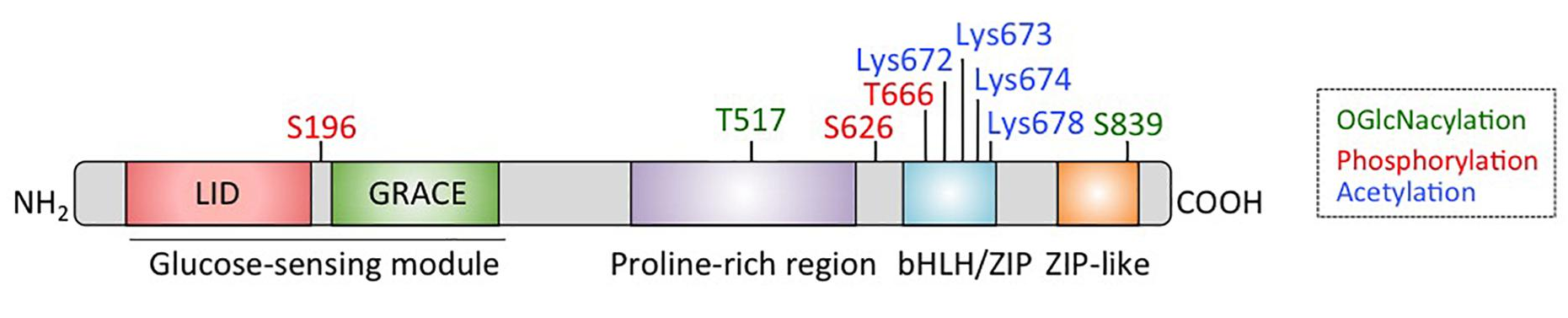
Domains of ChREBP. The N-terminal glucose-sensing module consists of the low glucose inhibitory domain (LID) and the glucose activated conserved element (GRACE). The C-terminal regions consists of a polyproline-rich, a bHLH/LZ and a leucine-zipper-like (Zip-like) domain. Phosphorylation sites in red, acetylation sites in blue and O-GlcNAcylation sites in green.

ChREBP is a member of the Mondo family of transcription factors, and part of the Myc / Max / Mad superfamily. Proteins in the Mondo family are involved in nutrient-sensing and regulation of metabolism, responding particularly to glucose levels. They are characterized by a basic helix-loop-helix leucine zipper (bHLH-ZIP) structure, and form heterodimers with MLX protein. The two main members of this family are MondoA (MLX-interacting protein or MLXIP) and ChREBP (MondoB, MLXIPL).

Two regions within ChREBP have been identified as key to its mechanisms of action. The N-terminal region, contains its glucose sensing element and participates in the cellular localization of the factor. The C-terminal region is responsible for the formation of the heterodimer ChREBP-MLX and its binding to DNA.

== Function ==
ChREBP is highly expressed in the liver and other metabolic tissues such as white and brown adipose tissue, pancreatic islet cells, small intestine, and kidney. It is expressed at lower levels in tissues such as skeletal muscle. Mondo family proteins, including ChREBP, are responsible for carbohydrate-induced transcription of glycolytic and lipogenic enzymes. They are crucial in regulating nutrient metabolism and energy homeostasis.

ChREBP's activation by glucose is a key mechanism for converting excess carbohydrate into stored fat. This occurs independent of insulin signaling: while insulin also helps to regulate glucose metabolism, the activation of ChREBP is separately triggered by glucose levels. Carbohydrate metabolites activate the canonical form of ChREBP, ChREBP-α, which stimulates production of a potent, constitutively active ChREBP isoform called ChREBP-β. These isoforms may have distinct functions: Combinations of ChREBP-α and ChREBP-β mediate the effects of ChREBP activation on ChREBP's genomic targets.

The precise identity of the activating metabolite has been variously claimed to be xylulose-5-phosphate, glucose-6-phosphate and fructose-2-6-bisphosphate and these effects have been attributed both to direct effects and to effects mediated by post-translational modification. However, the N-terminal domain of ChREBP-α was shown to bind and be activated by glycerol-3-phosphate, suggesting a mechanism by which the backbone of triglyceride synthesis serves as the signal for synthesis of new long chain fatty acids that will be linked to it.

ChREBP forms heterodimers with other bHLH-Zip proteins, particularly Mlx, and binds to carbohydrate response element (ChoRE) sequences. ChoRE sequences are typically found in regions of DNA where gene expression is transcriptionally induced by glucose. ChoRE sequences serve as binding sites for transcription factors that respond to changes in glucose levels. The ChoRE-ChREBP pathway is a key mechanism through which glucose regulates the synthesis of triglycerides, by controlling the expression of genes that encode enzymes.

ChREBP's ability to bind DNA and transactivate gene expression depends upon its dimerization with MLX protein. For full functional activity, two heterodimeric ChREBP-MLX complexes (each containing one ChREBP and one MLX molecule) join together to form a heterotetramer that binds to a ChoRE DNA sequence consisting of two adjacent E-boxes. This forms the active transcriptional complex.

ChREBP regulates the expression of genes involved in glucose and lipid metabolism, glycolysis in the liver, and de novo lipogenesis (DNL) in adipose tissue. ChREBP is a major mediator of glucose action on glycolytic enzymes such as Pklr, lipogenic enzymes such as ACC and FASN, and G6P disposal, among others. Many factors mediate the activation or inactivation of ChREBP. ChREBP is also subject to post-translational modifications such as phosphorylation, acetylation, and O-linked glycosylation, which can affect its activity.

== Clinical significance ==
The Mlxipl gene, which encodes ChREBP, is deleted in Williams-Beuren syndrome. Williams-Beuren syndrome is a multisystem developmental disorder caused by the deletion of contiguous genes at chromosome 7q11.23.

ChREBP, activated by glucose-derived metabolites, plays a key role in metabolic homeostasis. It is a factor in diseases where metabolic homeostasis is disrupted, including obesity, Type 2 diabetes, fatty liver disease and metabolic syndrome.

Generally ChREBP promotes lipid synthesis. ChREBP also plays an important role in insulin sensitivity, redirecting excess glucose to fatty acid production and modulating the composition of lipids. In the liver, ChREBP acts in coordination with SREBP-1c, which is activated by insulin, to control glucose and lipid metabolism. ChREBP also mediates the expression of the hepatokin FGF21, which is increased in obesity and can increase glucose tolerance and reduce hypertriglyceridemia. ChREBP activates enzymes that both utilize and produce glucose, suggesting that ChREBP works as a mediator of intracellular G6P homeostasis.

Conditions such as metabolic syndrome or type 2 diabetes can lead to excess expression of ChREBP and increased production of fatty acids, causing hepatic steatosis or "fatty liver". In non-alcoholic fatty liver disease, about 25% of total liver lipids result from de novo synthesis (synthesis of lipids from glucose). High blood glucose and insulin enhance lipogenesis in the liver by activation of ChREBP and SREBP-1c, respectively. Chronically elevated blood glucose can activate ChREBP in the pancreas and lead to excessive lipid synthesis in beta cells, increasing lipid accumulation in those cells, leading to lipotoxicity, beta-cell apoptosis, and type 2 diabetes.

=== History ===
In 2000, the transcription factor for ChREBP was first fully characterized. It was initially designated as WBSCR14, due to its involvement in the genetic disorder Williams–Beuren syndrome. Concommitently, Donald Ayer identified MondoA as a transcription factor and MLX-interacting protein (MLXIP) active in muscle tissue. Given that there were some similarities between MondoA and WBSCR14, WBSCR14 became referred to as MondoB. In 2001, Kosaku Uyeda and others identified the transcription factor's major role in glucose-responsive regulation and lipid metabolism. Once it was characterized as a carbohydrate sensor, it became known as ChREBP. The discoveries of MondoA and ChREBP defined basic helix–loop-helix leucine zipper (bHLH/LZ) transcriptional activators as a family. Because of their interactions with Max-like X protein (MLX), MondoA is also known as MLX interacting protein (MLXIP) and ChREBP is known as MLX interacting protein-like (MLXIPL). In 2012, the ChREBP-β isoform was identified.
