= Efimosfermin alfa =

Clinical data
- Other names: BOS-580

Legal status
- Legal status: Investigational

Identifiers
- CAS Number: 2765640-39-7
- UNII: Y114QW0F16

Efimosfermin alfa (development code BOS-580) is a long-acting fibroblast growth factor 21 analog that can be injected once monthly. It was acquired by Boston Pharmaceuticals from Novartis in 2020.
