= CREB-binding protein =

Nuclear protein that binds to CREB

CREBBP
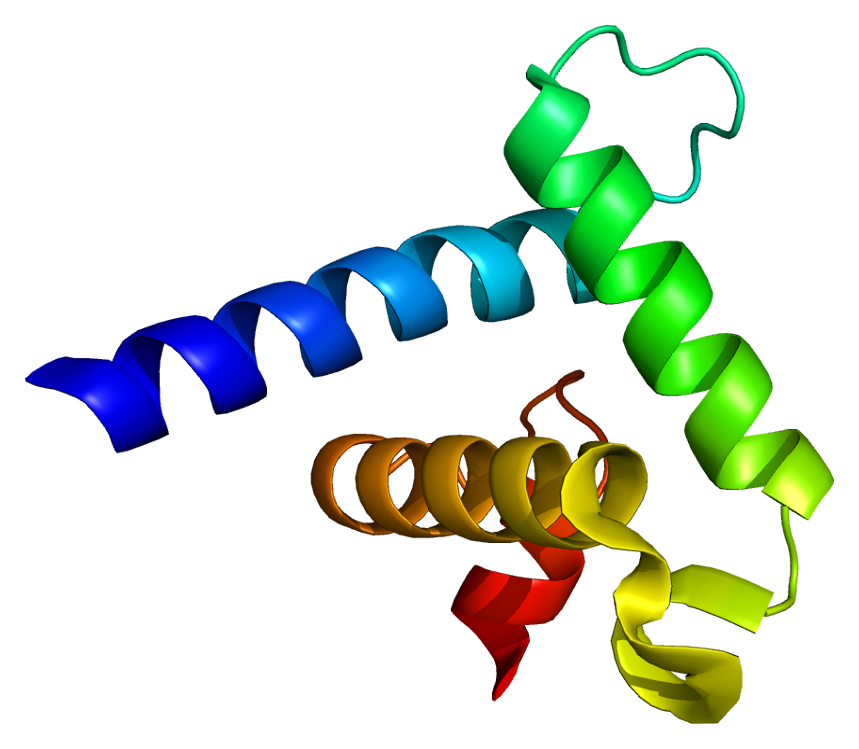

Identifiers
- Aliases: CREBBP, AW558298, CBP, CBP/p300, KAT3A, p300/CBP, RSTS, CREB binding protein, RSTS1, MKHK1
- External IDs: OMIM: 600140; MGI: 1098280; GeneCards: CREBBP
Available structures
PDB	Ortholog search: PDBe RCSB
PDB	List of PDB id codes 1JSP, 1LIQ, 1RDT, 1WO3, 1WO4, 1WO5, 1WO6, 1WO7, 2D82, 2KJE, 2KWF, 2L84, 2L85, 2LXS, 2LXT, 2RNY, 3DWY, 3P1C, 3P1D, 3P1E, 3P1F, 3SVH, 4A9K, 4N3W, 4N4F, 4NR4, 4NR5, 4NR6, 4NR7, 4NYV, 4NYW, 4NYX, 4OUF, 4TQN, 4TS8, 4WHU, 5JEM, 5I8B, 5I89, 5I86, 4YK0, 5CGP, 5I8G, 2N1A, 5I83, 1ZOQ, 5DBM
Enzyme activity
EC #	BRENDA	ExPASy	KEGG	MetaCyc
2.3.1.48	↗	↗	↗	↗

Gene location (Human)
Chr.	Chromosome 16 (human)
Band	16p13.3	Start	3,725,054 bp
Band	16p13.3	End	3,880,713 bp

Gene location (Mouse)
Chr.	Chromosome 16 (mouse)
Band	16 A1|16 2.4 cM	Start	3,899,192 bp
Band	16 A1|16 2.4 cM	End	4,031,861 bp
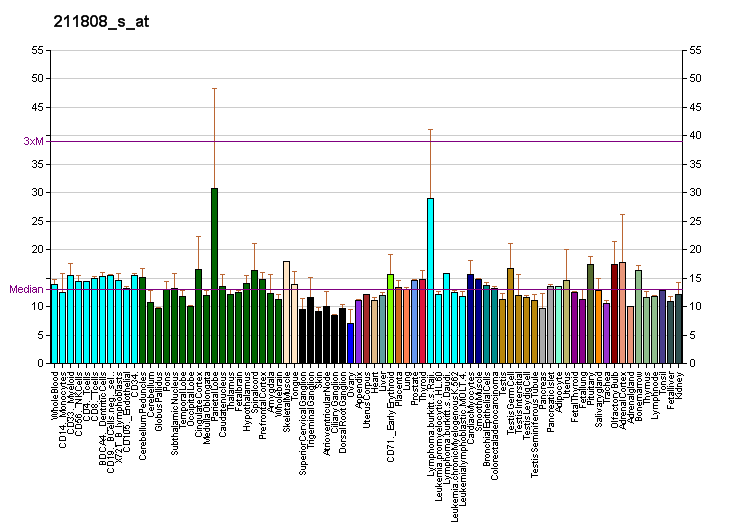

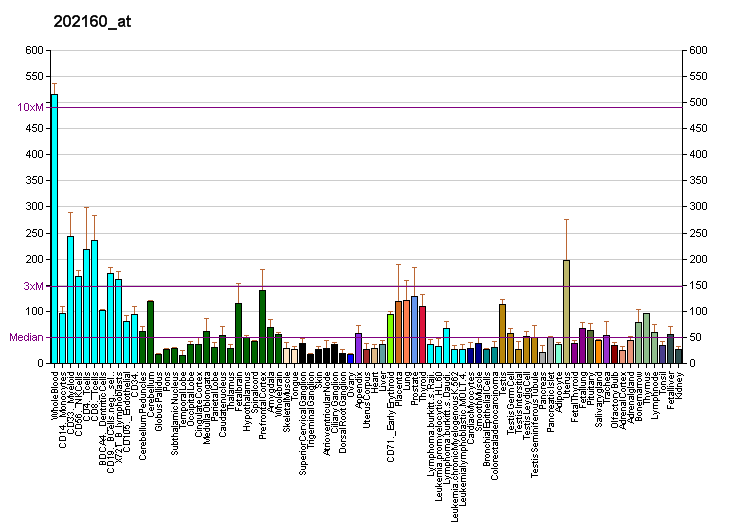
RNA expression pattern
Bgee	Human / Mouse (ortholog); Top expressed in: sural nerve; tibia; amniotic fluid; germinal epithelium; Achilles tendon; endothelial cell; bone marrow cell; skin of hip; caput epididymis; testicle / Top expressed in: Rostral migratory stream; ascending aorta; aortic valve; Gonadal ridge; Ileal epithelium; cumulus cell; secondary oocyte; zygote; primary oocyte; ciliary body; More reference expression data
BioGPS	More reference expression data
Gene ontology
Molecular function	transferase activity; transcription coactivator activity; MRF binding; zinc ion binding; p53 binding; transcription factor binding; chromatin binding; cis-regulatory region sequence-specific DNA binding; transcription coregulator activity; signal transducer activity; metal ion binding; histone acetyltransferase activity; damaged DNA binding; DNA-binding transcription repressor activity, RNA polymerase II-specific; protein binding; acetyltransferase activity; acyltransferase activity; peptide N-acetyltransferase activity; DNA-binding transcription factor activity; transcription corepressor activity
Cellular component	cytoplasm; nucleoplasm; histone acetyltransferase complex; nucleus; nuclear body
Biological process	Notch signaling pathway; response to hypoxia; regulation of transcription, DNA-templated; rhythmic process; cellular response to UV; embryonic digit morphogenesis; N-terminal peptidyl-lysine acetylation; stimulatory C-type lectin receptor signaling pathway; negative regulation of transcription by RNA polymerase II; transcription, DNA-templated; positive regulation of transcription, DNA-templated; regulation of smoothened signaling pathway; histone acetylation; regulation of transcription from RNA polymerase II promoter in response to hypoxia; regulation of cellular response to heat; transcription initiation from RNA polymerase II promoter; viral process; positive regulation of type I interferon production; signal transduction; protein acetylation; homeostatic process; beta-catenin-TCF complex assembly; regulation of apoptotic process; positive regulation of transcription by RNA polymerase II; regulation of lipid metabolic process; protein destabilization; regulation of myeloid cell differentiation; positive regulation of transcription of Notch receptor target; positive regulation of transforming growth factor beta receptor signaling pathway; positive regulation of Notch signaling pathway; protein-containing complex assembly
Sources:Amigo / QuickGO
Orthologs
Databases	NCBI: entry; OMA: entry
Species	Human	Mouse
Entrez	1387	12914
Ensembl	ENSG00000005339	ENSMUSG00000022521
UniProt	Q92793	P45481
RefSeq (mRNA)	NM_001079846; NM_004380	NM_001025432
RefSeq (protein)	NP_001073315; NP_004371	n/a
Location (UCSC)	Chr 16: 3.73 – 3.88 Mb	Chr 16: 3.9 – 4.03 Mb
PubMed search
- Wikidata
View/Edit Human	View/Edit Mouse

CREB-binding protein, also known as CREBBP or CBP or KAT3A, (where CREB is cAMP response element-binding protein) is a coactivator encoded by the CREBBP gene in humans, located on chromosome 16p13.3. CBP has intrinsic acetyltransferase functions; it is able to add acetyl groups to both transcription factors as well as histone lysines, the latter of which has been shown to alter chromatin structure making genes more accessible for transcription. This relatively unique acetyltransferase activity is also seen in another transcription enzyme, EP300 (p300). Together, they are known as the p300-CBP coactivator family and are known to associate with more than 16,000 genes in humans; however, while these proteins share many structural features, emerging evidence suggests that these two co-activators may promote transcription of genes with different biological functions.

For example, CBP alone has been implicated in a wide variety of pathophysiologies including colorectal cancer as well as head and neck squamous cell carcinoma. In these diseases, association of CBP with β-catenin has been shown to promote cancer cell proliferation and disease aggressiveness, whereas p300/ β-catenin leads to cell differentiation and/ or apoptosis. CBP has also been shown to help modulate liver function via maintenance of energy homeostasis in response to changes in cell nutrition conditions by regulating the activity of transcription factors and genes responsible for lipogenesis and gluconeogenesis. CBP is also implicated in the etiologies of several other diseases including hematologic malignancies and other solid tumors, diabetes, schizophrenia, Alzheimer's disease, depression, and many other neurological conditions.

== Structure ==
The functional CBP is approximately 7362 nucleotides long and encodes 2,441 amino acids. CBP does not directly interact with promoter elements; it is brought to the site via protein-protein interactions that are the result of its different structural domains complexing with other transcriptional co-activators.

=== Transitional adapter zinc finger domains ===
CBP has two transitional adapter zinc finger (TAZ) domains that each consist of four alpha helices stabilized by zinc ions. Both TAZ1 and TAZ2 domains favor the hydrophobic residues within amphipathic amino acid sequences, and their binding affinity is enhanced by the interaction of acidic residues with positive side chains. Factors that bind to TAZ2 are also potentially regulated via acetylation due to its proximity to the acetyltransferase domain (KAT).

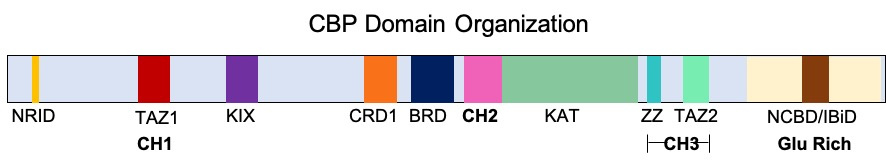
Organization of the main CBP protein domains

=== Cysteine-histidine rich regions ===
Although there are three cysteine-histidine rich domains identified within CBP, only domains 1 and 3 (CH1, CH3) have had their structural functions resolved. A number of factors that associate with CBP bind to either the CH1 or CH3 domain, or to both, despite their locations at opposing ends of the protein. To date, little is known about the interaction between these two domains. The primary structure of CH1 and CH3 has been shown to break down into consensus sequences that are capable of chelating zinc ions (Zn^{2+}). Experiments performed also showed that the residues in these sequences are obligatory for transcriptional coactivation to occur by either CH1 or CH3. The CH2 region, located in the middle of the protein, in its acetyltransferase domain, does not contain this consensus sequence, and has not been conclusively shown to bind zinc ions.

=== Kinase-inducible domain interacting domain ===
Aka KIX domain, CREB binding domain, MYB interaction domain

The kinase-inducible domain (KID) interacting domain (KIX) also is the protein domain on CBP and p300 where heterodimers form from the interaction of CBP (or p300) with other transcription factors and coactivators. It consists of three alpha and two 310 helices that have high affinity for amphipathic protein sequences. Interestingly, these helices can fold into a number of different conformers which enables the domain to maintain both a level of promiscuity while also exerting regulatory control. The KIX domain controls the rate of transcription and has been shown to be critical for hematopoietic differentiation. Some of the proteins that bind to this domain have been shown to bind competitively—such as CREB and Myb—whereas others bind via allosteric cooperation as in the case of MLL and Myb.

=== Bromodomain ===
Bromodomains (BRD) consist of approximately 110 amino acids, that function to recognize acetylated lysine molecules. They consist of four left-handed alpha helices connected by loops which form hydrophobic binding pockets. The bromodomain of CBP binds to regions of the genome are rich with acetylated lysine residues, meaning they have lost their positive charge, decreasing histone affinity for DNA, which makes the region more open and accessible for transcription. Acetylated p53 and STAT3 have been shown to bind to CBP's bromodomain.

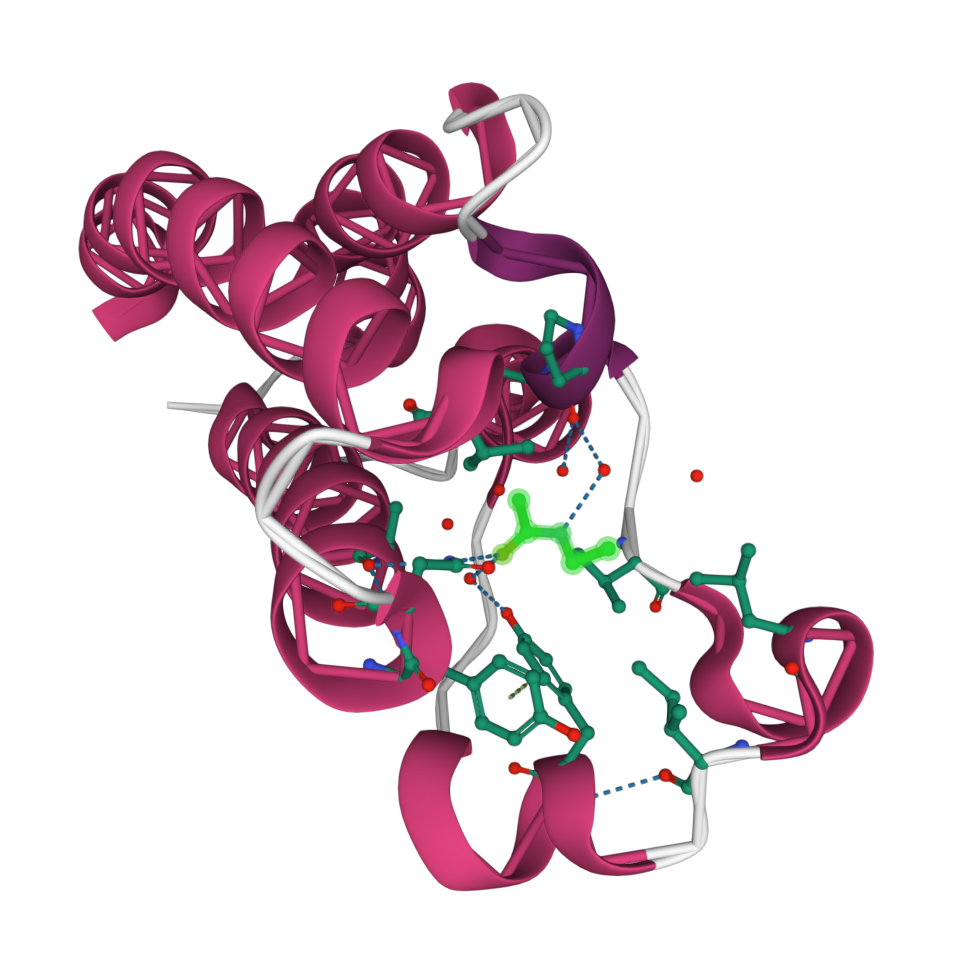
Crystal structure of the human CBP bromodomain in complex with acetylated lysine. PBD id: 3P1C

=== Lysine acetyltransferase domain ===
The 380 protein residue lysine acetyltransferase (KAT) domain is one of the most important and identifying structural components of CBP. Its activity is regulated via phosphorylation of CBP. It is able to acetylate histones and proteins as well. Currently there are over 100 known substrates for CBP's KAT domain including proteins such as p53, E2F-1-3, GATA-1, MyoD and CREB. The ability of CBP to acetylate p53 via its KAT domain, which then increases p53's affinity for CBP's bromodomain showcases an interesting mechanism by which this protein can regulate gene transcription.

=== Nuclear receptor coactivator binding domain ===
Aka interferon response factor binding domain (IBiD)

The nuclear receptor coactivator binding domain (NCBD) located at the c-terminus of CBP, in its unbound state, fluctuates between multiple conformations. Binding of a target protein to NCBD will cause it to fold into three helices specifically functioned to associated with the disordered domains of its binding partners. Among the proteins known to bind to this region include ACTR (p160)--a coactivator for the thyroid and retinoid receptors, its homolog SRC-1, p53, and SMAD.

== Interactions ==
Proteins shown to interact specifically with CBP

- Actr
- Ap-1
- Apc5
- Apc7
- Atr
- BRCA1
- C-FOS
- C-JUN
- C-MYB
- Chrebp
- CITED2
- Ddb1 (p127)
- Ddb2 (p48)
- Ddx3
- Dhx9

- DNA2 helicase
- E1A
- E2F
- Elk1
- ER
- Ets1
- Fen1
- Foxo1
- Gal4
- GATA1
- GR
- hATF4
- HNF-1
- Hif-1α
- Ku70

- MDM2
- MLL
- MyoD
- NF-κB
- p53
- p73
- Parp1
- pCREB
- pCAF
- PCNA
- Pit1
- RAR
- RXR
- SCRAP
- SMAD

- Src1
- Srebp1c
- STAT1
- STAT2
- STAT3
- Sumo
- T3R
- TBP
- Tdg
- TFIIB
- TFIIE
- TFIIF
- Wrn
- Xpa
- Zta (BZLF1)

== Function ==
This gene is ubiquitously expressed and is involved in the transcriptional coactivation of many different transcription factors. CBP has two critical mechanisms by which it is able to regulate gene expression: as an acetyltransferase, and as a protein scaffold that helps recruit and construct the complexes that are necessary for transcription or chromatin remodeling. Phosphorylation of CBP increases its acetyltransferase activity, a process hypothesized to be regulated in a cell cycle dependent manner. Recent results suggest that novel CBP-mediated post-translational N-glycosylation activity alters the conformation of CBP-interacting proteins, leading to regulation of gene expression, cell growth and differentiation,

=== Distinction from p300 ===
Often in scientific papers (especially in less recent ones), CBP and p300 are used interchangeably as CBP/p300. This is a reasonable amalgamation given the sequence homology, structural similarity and binding behaviors of these two proteins. However, ongoing research shows that CBP and p300 maintain distinct biological functions and should therefore not be conflated.

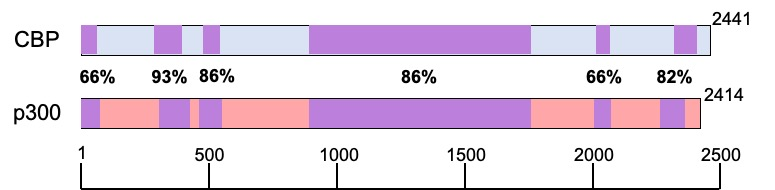
Amino acid sequence homology between CBP and p300 transcription factors.

It has been reported that despite having common histone substrates, when there are lower amounts of histone or acetyl-CoA available, CBP and p300 have different, preferred acetyltransferase substrates. In an experiment performed involving the Kaposi sarcoma-associated herpesvirus, the pathological protein (vIRF), was shown to be upregulated by CBP and repressed by p300. p300 homozygous knockout studies in mice were embryonic lethal, with improper neurulation and poor heart development occurring during their limited survival. Additionally, the fibroblasts isolated from these mice were unable to properly proliferate and were lacking the retinoic acid receptor. Transgenically altered mice homozygous for mutated copies of CBP (missing the KAT domain), were also embryonic lethal, however instead, these mice had poor vascular angiogenesis and abnormal hematopoiesis characterized by the absence of progenitor cell proliferation and an altered hematopoietic microenvironment. The fact that both CBP and p300 homozygous knockouts were embryonic lethal suggest that these factors play a critical role in embryogenesis. The differential phenotypes of these embryos also indicate that CBP and p300 regulate different aspects of embryological development.

=== Role in cell cycle regulation ===
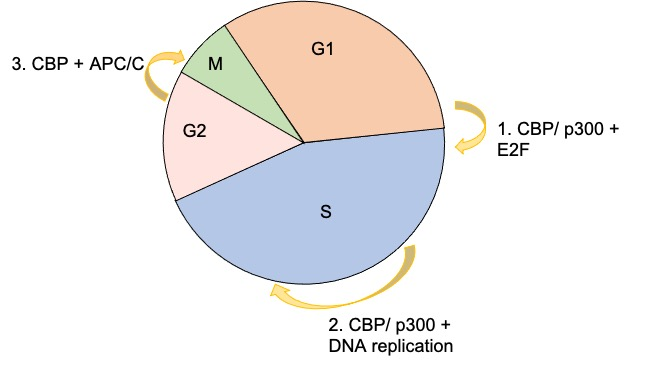
CBP and p300 control cell cycle progression at various points through many of their different regulatory functions.

Studies performed in the late 1990s demonstrated that peak CBP acetyltransferase activity occurs at the transition between the G1/S phase of the cell cycle checkpoint. Given the concentrations of CDK2 present in the cell at this stage of the cell cycle, it was hypothesized that CDK2 may be a key regulator of these post-translational modifications. It turned out that administration of cyclin E/CDK2 inhibitors did in fact inhibit the enzymatic activity of CBP's KAT domain. Other proteins that have been shown to phosphorylate CBP include MAP Kinase, PKA and CAMK4. Ser-133 has been shown to be an important residue that is phosphorylated by PKA to initiate CBP transcriptional activity.

The E2F family of transcription factors are critical for taking a cell from G1 to S phase of the cell cycle. They bind to a sequence consensus in the promoter region of genes involved in DNA replication. CBP (and p300) have been shown to interact with E2F proteins as both a coactivator, and as an acetyltransferase, the latter of which causes increased E2F DNA binding affinity. A knockout study that was published in 2000, which used a microinjection of an antibody against CBP/p300 significantly diminished the number of cells able to progress into S phase, further supporting the idea that CBP is essential in the transcription of factors necessary G1/S phase transition.

CBP is also believed to facilitate the process of DNA replication during S phase by acetylating histones around origins of replication. Acetylation of histones, specifically lysine residues in the histones, weakens the electric charge interaction between the histone and DNA, causing this area to become more open and accessible for the machinery required for DNA replication. Two histone acetylation markers that have been associated with active regions include histone 3 lysine 18 acetylation (H3K18ac) and histone 3 lysine 27 acetylation (H3K27ac). It has also been shown that CBP acetylates two endonucleases (FEN1, DNA2) that are involved in processing Okazaki fragments.

Another key component of the cell cycle that is regulated by CBP is the anaphase promoting complex/cyclosome (APC/C). This complex consists of numerous subunits that are grouped into two subdomains, the "Arc Lamp" and the "Platform," and functions as an E3 ubiquitin ligase that targets components related to the cell cycle such as cyclin B, securin, and PLK1 for proteasome degradation. Two subunits of the APC/C have been shown to directly interact with CBP: AP5, which is located in the Platform subdomain, and AP7, located in the Arc Lamp subdomain. Experiments performed using RNAi to completely suppress CBP and p300 showed significant increases in protein concentrations for those normally targeted by the APC/C, and caused a number of cells to become arrested in the mitotic phase of the cell cycle.

CBP and p300 have been shown to acetylate key factors involved in different DNA repair processes, including base excision repair, nucleotide excision repair and non-homologous end joining. CBP and p300 play a role in the acetylation of DNA damage response proteins and this post-translational modification influences their function.

== Role in disease ==
=== Rubinstein–Taybi syndrome ===
Rubinstein–Taybi syndrome (RTS) is a rare genetic disorder that is the result of genetic mutations in either CBP or p300. RTS Type 1, which is caused by CBP mutations, for which over 500 different variations have been documented, accounts for approximately 55% of all cases, whereas RTS Type 2, which is caused by any of the nearly 120 different types of p300 mutations, accounts for only 8% of diagnosed cases. The majority of these mutations have been shown to cause loss of function of the gene via deletions, point or truncating mutations. Statistics indicate that RTS patients have and increased risk of cancer, with approximately 5% of that attributable to pediatric malignancies originating from the neural crest. Individuals with RTS frequently have skeletal abnormalities, neuroanatomical defects, and mental impairments including lower levels of intelligence, attention deficits and impaired motor coordination.

Cancers with Frequent CBP Mutations
Cancer type	N	% of samples mutated
Follicular lymphoma	66	33.3
Skin squamous cell carcinoma	77	28.6
Marginal zone B-cell lymphoma	15	13.3
Diffuse large B-cell lymphoma	242	12.0
Salivary gland carcinoma	63	9.5
Bladder carcinoma	438	8.9
Endometrial carcinoma	337	8.0
Lung small-cell carcinoma	52	7.7
ER+ Breast carcinoma	80	7.5

=== Cancer ===
CBP has been shown to play a role in every stage of tumor development. Due to its critical role in regulation of cell proliferation, growth, migration and apoptosis, it is considered to be an oncogene, or tumor suppressor. Contrarily To date, increased CBP activity has been implicated in a variety of different malignancies including breast cancer, lung cancer, prostate cancer, colorectal cancer, acute leukemias, head and neck cancer, and many others. According to the Catalog of Somatic Mutations in Cancer (COSMIC), the most common genetic mutations in CBP are missense mutations (accounting for ~71% of all CBP mutations). The most frequent mutations occur in the KAT domain, resulting largely in either decreased or inhibited acetyltransferase activity.

==== Hematological malignancies ====
Embryonic mice heterozygous for CBP (Cbp^{+/-}) exhibited "extramedullary hematopoiesis, decreased bone marrow cellularity [a lower ratio of bone marrow to fat], and hematopoietic differentiation abnormalities." By age 1, these mice had an increased incidence of leukemia or hematologic neoplasia. Interestingly, tumor sequencing showed loss of heterozygosity for the wild type allele. One explanation proposed for these experimental results is that CBP plays a role in hematopoietic stem cell self-renewal.

In cases of patients diagnosed with Acute Myeloid Leukemia (AML) and Myelodysplastic Syndrome, CBP has been shown to gain function. This occurs via chromosomal translocations between CBP and other acetyltransferase called the monocytes leukemia zinc finger (MOZ), and or between MORF (MOZ-related factor) and MLL (mixed-lineage leukemia) genes. Both instances result in fused proteins in which C-terminus of CBP is lost, and the acetyltransferase domains from both proteins remain, resulting in up-regulated KAT activity and onset of disease.

For patients with a relapsing case of Acute Lymphoblastic Leukemia (ALL), it was reported approximately 18% of them had CBP KAT domain mutations.

==== Solid tumors ====
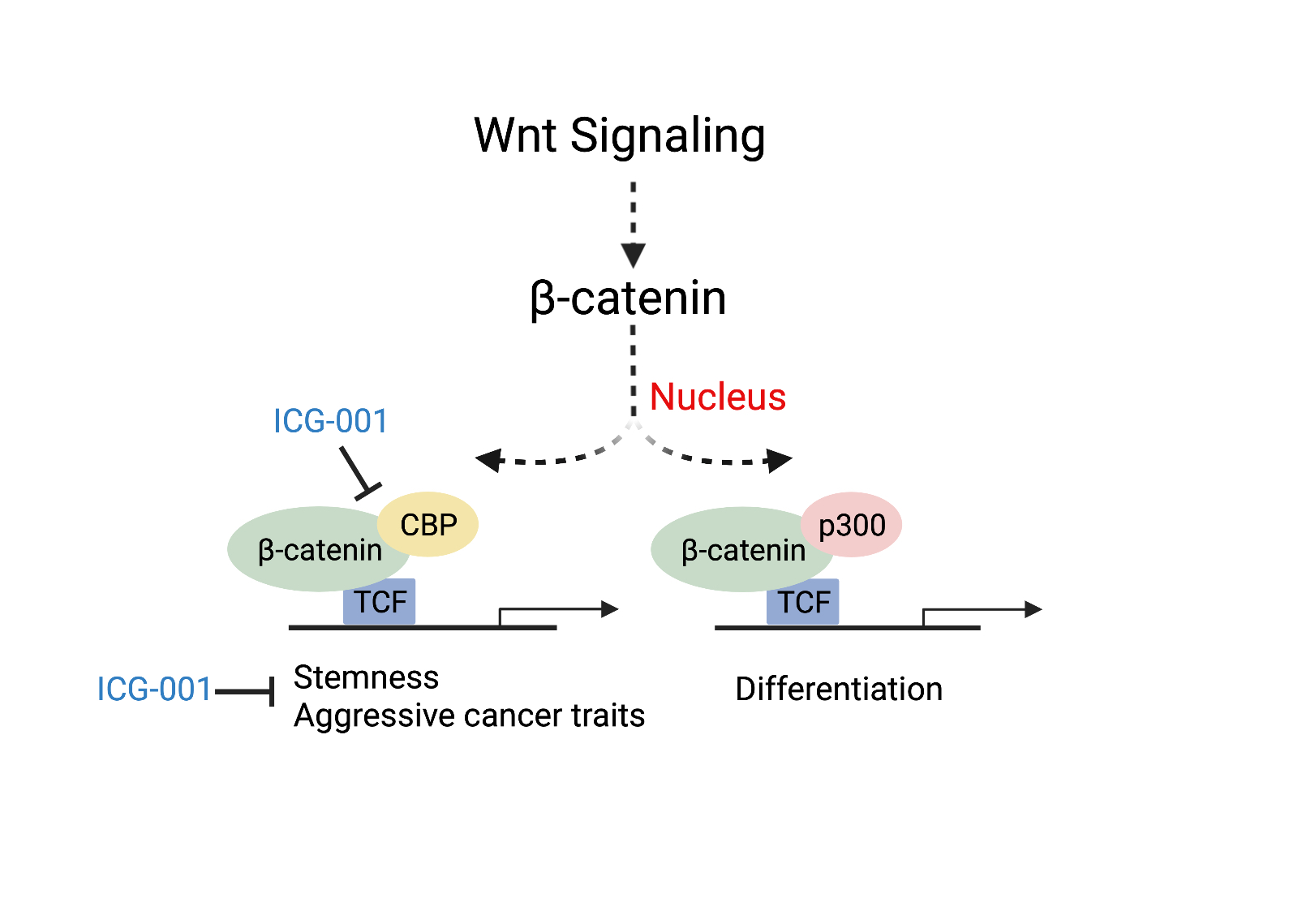
Different transcription pathways activated in cancers by β-catenin association with CBP or its homolog p300. ICG-001 inhibition only effects CBP/β-catenin.

CBP mutations, though relatively infrequent, have been identified in lung cancer. Further analysis has also revealed that during the early stages of respiratory epithelium tumorigenesis, there is increased expression in CBP as well as AP-1 and cyclin D1, factors known to be associated with CBP transcriptional activity. This over-expression may lead to downstream signaling events that favor lung tumor development.

Colorectal cancer and head and neck cancer (HNSCC) disease severity have been linked to the association of CBP with β-catenin, a critical factor involved in the canonical Wnt signaling pathway. Association of CBP with β-catenin leads to the transcription of genes responsible for more aggressive cancer traits including the presence of cancer stem cell populations, decreased immune cell infiltration and likelihood of metastasis. Experiments studying the use of a small molecule inhibitor of β-catenin/CBP association (ICG-001), that does not block p300/β-catenin association, saw decreased carcinogenesis and increased cellular differentiation and apoptosis.

Increased nuclear hormone signaling, mediated by the androgen (AR) and estrogen (ER) receptors, are responsible for a number of prostate and breast cancer cases, respectively. CBP is known to interact with the AR and ER in both coactivator and acetyltransferase contexts. Inhibition of CBP KAT activity has been shown to decrease AR and ER signaling by down regulating receptor expression; this in turn suppresses tumorigenesis of both malignancies.

=== Metabolic homeostasis ===
Energy homeostasis, which relies on a balance of glucose and lipids, is essential for organism survival. Diseases involving impaired metabolic activity include obesity, Type 2 Diabetes (T2D) and nonalcoholic fatty liver disease (NAFLD). In the context equilibrium, over nutrition promotes lipogenesis (lipid synthesis) in response to increased glucose and insulin concentrations, and fasting promotes β-oxidation (lipid breakdown) and gluconeogenesis (synthesis of glucose). Experiments performed in diet-induced obese mice saw increased lipogenesis driven by over expression of sterol regulatory element binding protein 1C (SREBP1C), which works in coordination with the carbohydrate responsive-element binding protein (ChREBP). Both are transcription factors critical for lipogenesis, and both are acetylated by CBP, a post translational modification that increases their transcriptional activity. To balance the increase in lipid synthesis, the body needs to be able to export the macromolecule out of cells and storage. Microsomal triglyceride transfer protein (MTP) is responsible for lipoprotein assembly and secretion, and it associates with an RNA helicase, DDX3, which interacts with CBP causing HNF4 acetylation, which in turn increases the rate of transcription of MTP in a positive feedback loop.

CBP also has a role in regulation of glucose homeostasis during fasting conditions. Research has also shown that glucagon, a hormone released when the body has low blood sugar, activates cAMP response element binding protein (CREB), which then binds to CBP as a coactivator for transcription of FOXO1. FOXO1 is a transcription factor for enzymes including glucose-6-phosphatase and phosphoenolpyruvate carboxykinase (PECK1), which are necessary for gluconeogenesis.

=== Neurological disorders ===
CREB has been shown to have neuroprotective properties. Because of its association with CBP, understanding the role of CBP in neurological pathways and how aberrations influence disease is becoming of increasing interest. Numerous animal models have been designed in order to evaluate changes in motor, learning and memory function in mice with CBP mutations. Conditional knockout (cKO) mice that were hemizygous for CBP or had CBP point mutations exhibited memory defects—specifically related to long-term memory. For mice with homozygous point mutations in their CBP KIX domain, they demonstrated impaired motor skill learning and execution. In conjunction with the neurological challenges experienced by RTS patients (lower levels of intelligence, attention deficits), CBP is attributable to a variety of neurological symptoms characteristic of many different types of diseases.

==== Fetal alcohol spectrum disorders ====
Fetal alcohol spectrum disorders (FASD) is a classification of diseases that all result from alcohol exposure during pregnancy. Symptoms of these disorders include poor cerebellar-dependent learning, motor coordination and impaired balance. In rats with FASD, it was shown that they had decreased concentrations of CBP and lower amounts of H3 and H4 acetylation.

==== Huntington's disease ====
Huntington's disease (HD) is a fatal, progressing neurodegenerative disorder that is the result of a genetic mutation in the Huntingtin gene causing synthesis of a mutated huntingtin (Htt) protein. Symptoms most frequently associated with this disease are movement disorders, including impaired motor function, behavioral modification and cognitive impairment that ultimately results in dementia. It has been observed in animal models that HD subjects had diminished CBP activity and decreased neuronal histone acetylation. Research has shown that mutHtt directly interacts with CBP It has been hypothesized that mutant Htt is either capable of degrading CBP, or it directly inhibits CBP's acetyltransferase domain.

==== Alzheimer's disease ====
Alzheimer's disease (AD) is a progressive neurodegenerative disease whose pathology is diagnosed based on the presence of neuritic amyloid beta (Aβ) plaques and neurofibrillary tau (τ) tangles. Because the exact causes of the disease are not clearly understood, there are a number of different mechanisms by which CBP is hypothesized to play a role in the progression of AD. In many cases of early-onset familial AD (FAD), there are mutations of the proteins that make up the enzyme responsible for the creation of Aβ plaques. CBP activity is decreased in the absence of these proteins (presenilin 1 or presenilin 2). Additionally, in mouse models of AD, it has been shown that there is a decrease in neuronal histone acetylation, a critical function of CBP.

== Inhibition of CBP ==
Given the control CBP has over a wide variety of physiological processes, the development of inhibitors for CBP activity have become increasingly important as potential therapies. To date, only a fraction of what has been discovered have progressed into clinical trials.

Compounds identified to inhibit CBP
Drug	Stage of development	Disease(s)/ areas targeted	Reference
A-485	In vitro/ in vivo	Hematological malignancies, androgen receptor positive prostate cancer	
C646	In vitro/ in vivo	Solid tumors, neuroepithelial histone acetylation rescue	
CBP30	In vitro	Autoimmune diseases	
CCS1477	Phase 1b/2a	Advanced castration resistant prostate cancer, hematological malignancies	
CPI-637	In vitro/ in vivo	Castration resistant prostate cancer	
dCBP-1	In silicon	Multiple myeloma (MM)	
DC_CP20	In silicon	Leukemia	
E7386	Phase 1	Solid tumors, prevents β-catenin/CBP protein-protein interactions	
Garcinol	In vitro/ in vivo	Esophageal cancer	
GNE-049	In vitro/ in vivio	Breast and prostate cancer	
GNE-207	In vitro/ in vivo	Acute myeloid leukemia (AML), potential other hematological malignancies	
GNE-781	In vitro/ in vivo	Acute myeloid leukemia (AML), potential other hematological malignancies, prostate and breast cancer	
HBS1	In vitro/ in vivo	Renal cell carcinoma	
I-CBP112	In vitro/ in vivo	CBP bromodomain	
ICG-001	In vitro/ in vivo	Colorectal cancer, head and neck squamous cell carcinoma	
KCN1	In vitro/ in vivo	Glioma	
MYBMIM	In silicon	Acute myeloid leukemia (AML), prevents CBP/Myb protein-protein interactions	
NASTRp	In vitro/ in vivo	Lung adenocarcinoma	
NEO2734	In vitro/ in vivo	Prostate cancer	
Nicur	In silicon	Gastrointestinal cancer	
OHM1	In vitro/ in vivo	Prevents CBP/HIF-1α protein-protein interaction	
PRI-724	In vitro/ in vivo	Liver fibrosis	
PU139	In vitro/ in vivo	Neuroblastoma	
Y08197	In vitro	Castration resistant prostate cancer	
