= MiR-191 =

miR-191
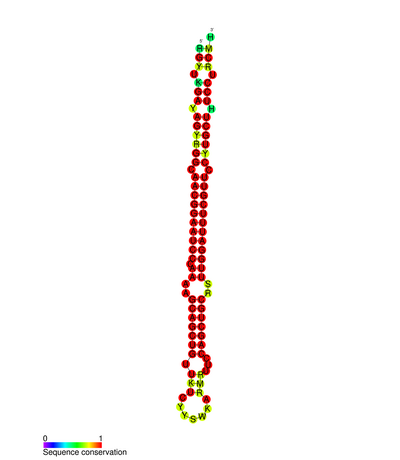
- Conserved secondary structure of miR-191 microRNA precursor

Identifiers
- Symbol: miR-191
- Alt. Symbols: MIR191
- Rfam: RF00764
- miRBase: MI0000465
- miRBase family: MIPF0000194
- NCBI Gene: 406966
- HGNC: 31561
- RefSeq: NR_029690

Other data
- RNA type: miRNA
- Domain: Mammalia
- GO: 0035195
- SO: 0001244
- Locus: Chr. 3 p21.31
- PDB structures: PDBe

miR-191 is a family of microRNA precursors found in mammals, including humans. The ~22 nucleotide mature miRNA sequence is excised from the precursor hairpin by the enzyme Dicer. This sequence then associates with RISC which effects RNA interference.

miR-191 has been found to be dysregulated in many types of human tumour, including those of colorectal, breast and prostate cancers. Despite these cancer links, target genes of the mature miRNA have not been characterised, and it is not known which factors lead to its dysregulation in certain tumour cells.

The expression profile of miR-191 could be implemented in prognosis of acute myeloid leukaemia, with higher than average levels of miR-191 suggesting a lower survival probability.

miR-191 plays an important role in erythropoiesis. Downregulation of miR-191 leads to upregulation of its target genes RIOK3 and MXI1, which together regulate erythroblast chromatin condensation and enucleation.
