= Glycopegylation =

Glycopegylation "is a site-selective PEGylation method developed for modifying complex glycoproteins". It can be useful to improve bioavailability and extend the half-life of various therapeutic proteins. Examples of glycopegylated molecules include pegozafermin and recombinant factor IX.
