= Pegozafermin =

Clinical data
- Other names: BIO89-100; TEV-47948

Legal status
- Legal status: Investigational

Identifiers
- CAS Number: 2489589-60-6
- UNII: UO870O6MFS

Pegozafermin (BIO89-100) is a long-acting, glycopegylated FGF21 analog developed for the treatment of nonalcoholic steatohepatitis and hypertriglyceridemia.
