= C-myc mRNA =

C-myc mRNA is a type of mRNA that serves as a template for the MYC protein which is implicated in the rapid growth of cancer cells. This mRNA is a topic of ongoing research to investigate the viability of preventing cancer growth by cleaving or degrading the c-myc mRNA.

== See also ==
- C-myc
