= MNT (gene) =

Protein-coding gene in the species Homo sapiens

Identifiers
- Aliases: MNT, MAD6, MXD6, ROX, bHLHd3, MAX network transcriptional repressor, lncRNA-HAL
- External IDs: OMIM: 603039; MGI: 109150; GeneCards: MNT

Gene location (Human)
Chr.	Chromosome 17 (human)
Band	17p13.3	Start	2,384,073 bp
Band	17p13.3	End	2,401,104 bp

Gene location (Mouse)
Chr.	Chromosome 11 (mouse)
Band	11 B5|11 45.76 cM	Start	74,721,746 bp
Band	11 B5|11 45.76 cM	End	74,736,551 bp
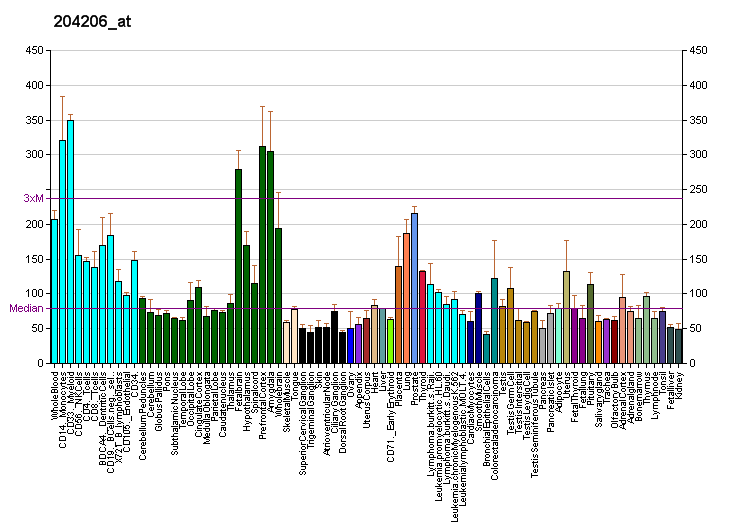
RNA expression pattern
Bgee	Human / Mouse (ortholog); Top expressed in: Brodmann area 23; middle temporal gyrus; Region I of hippocampus proper; endothelial cell; dorsal motor nucleus of vagus nerve; Brodmann area 10; sural nerve; gingival epithelium; orbitofrontal cortex; tendon of biceps brachii / Top expressed in: Rostral migratory stream; motor neuron; stroma of bone marrow; iris; ciliary body; gastrula; vestibular membrane of cochlear duct; substantia nigra; blood; aortic valve; More reference expression data
BioGPS	More reference expression data
Gene ontology
Molecular function	DNA-binding transcription factor activity; DNA binding; transcription coactivator activity; RNA polymerase II transcription regulatory region sequence-specific DNA binding; chromatin binding; protein dimerization activity; DNA-binding transcription repressor activity, RNA polymerase II-specific; transcription corepressor activity; DNA-binding transcription factor activity, RNA polymerase II-specific
Cellular component	nucleus; nucleoplasm
Biological process	multicellular organism development; negative regulation of apoptotic signaling pathway; regulation of transcription, DNA-templated; negative regulation of transcription by RNA polymerase II; transcription by RNA polymerase II; transcription, DNA-templated; negative regulation of cell population proliferation; regulation of cell cycle; positive regulation of nucleic acid-templated transcription
Sources:Amigo / QuickGO
Orthologs
Databases	NCBI: entry; OMA: entry
Species	Human	Mouse
Entrez	4335	17428
Ensembl	ENSG00000070444	ENSMUSG00000000282
UniProt	Q99583	O08789
RefSeq (mRNA)	NM_020310	NM_010813
RefSeq (protein)	NP_064706	NP_034943
Location (UCSC)	Chr 17: 2.38 – 2.4 Mb	Chr 11: 74.72 – 74.74 Mb
PubMed search
- Wikidata
View/Edit Human	View/Edit Mouse

MNT (Max-binding protein MNT) is a Max-binding protein that is encoded by the MNT gene

== Function ==
The Myc/Max/Mad network comprises a group of transcription factors that co-interact to regulate gene-specific transcriptional activation or repression. This gene encodes a protein member of the Myc/Max/Mad network. This protein has a basic-Helix-Loop-Helix-zipper domain (bHLHzip) with which it binds the canonical DNA sequence CANNTG, known as the E box, following heterodimerization with Max proteins. Its delta signature is 44. This protein is a transcriptional repressor and an antagonist of Myc-dependent transcriptional activation and cell growth. This protein represses transcription by binding to DNA and recruiting Sin3 corepressor proteins through its N-terminal Sin3-interaction domain

== Interactions ==
MNT (gene) has been shown to interact with MLX, SIN3A and MAX.
