= Foscenvivint =

CREB-binding protein/β-catenin inhibitor

Clinical data
- Other names: PRI 724; OP 724

Legal status
- Legal status: Investigational

Identifiers
- IUPAC name: [4-[[(6S,9S,9aS)-1-(Benzylcarbamoyl)-2,9-dimethyl-4,7-dioxo-8-(quinolin-8-ylmethyl)-3,6,9,9a-tetrahydropyrazino[2,1-c][1,2,4]triazin-6-yl]methyl]phenyl] dihydrogen phosphate
- CAS Number: 1422253-38-0
- PubChem CID: 71509318
- DrugBank: DB15034
- ChemSpider: 64854018
- UNII: 43Y934BBZ6
- KEGG: D12445
- ChEMBL: ChEMBL5274107

Chemical and physical data
- Formula: C_{33}H_{35}N_{6}O_{7}P
- Molar mass: 658.652 g·mol^{−1}
- 3D model (JSmol): Interactive image
- SMILES: C[C@H]1[C@H]2N([C@H](C(=O)N1CC3=CC=CC4=C3N=CC=C4)CC5=CC=C(C=C5)OP(=O)(O)O)C(=O)CN(N2C(=O)NCC6=CC=CC=C6)C
- InChI: InChI=1S/C33H35N6O7P/c1-22-31-38(29(40)21-36(2)39(31)33(42)35-19-24-8-4-3-5-9-24)28(18-23-13-15-27(16-14-23)46-47(43,44)45)32(41)37(22)20-26-11-6-10-25-12-7-17-34-30(25)26/h3-17,22,28,31H,18-21H2,1-2H3,(H,35,42)(H2,43,44,45)/t22-,28-,31-/m0/s1; Key:VHOZWHQPEJGPCC-AZXNYEMZSA-N

Foscenvivint (PRI 724 or OP 724) is a CREB-binding protein/β-catenin inhibitor that is developed for the treatment of liver diseases such as primary biliary cholangitis, hepatocellular carcinoma, and hepatitis C and B virus-induced liver cirrhosis.
