= De novo synthesis =

Synthesis of complex molecules from simple precursors

In chemistry, de novo synthesis (from Latin 'from the new') is the synthesis of complex molecules from simple molecules such as sugars or amino acids, as opposed to recycling after partial degradation. For example, nucleotides are not needed in the diet as they can be constructed from small precursor molecules such as formate and aspartate. Methionine, on the other hand, is needed in the diet because while it can be degraded to and then regenerated from homocysteine, it cannot be synthesized de novo.

== Nucleotide ==
De novo pathways of nucleotides do not use free bases: adenine (abbreviated as A), guanine (G), cytosine (C), thymine (T), or uracil (U). The purine ring is built up one atom or a few atoms at a time and attached to ribose throughout the process. Pyrimidine ring is synthesized as orotate and attached to ribose phosphate and later converted to common pyrimidine nucleotides.

== Cholesterol ==
Cholesterol is an essential structural component of animal cell membranes. Cholesterol also serves as a precursor for the biosynthesis of steroid hormones, bile acid and vitamin D. In mammals cholesterol is either absorbed from dietary sources or is synthesized de novo. Up to 70-80% of de novo cholesterol synthesis occurs in the liver, and about 10% of de novo cholesterol synthesis occurs in the small intestine. Cancer cells require cholesterol for cell membranes, so cancer cells contain many enzymes for de novo cholesterol synthesis from acetyl-CoA.

== Fatty-acid (de novo lipogenesis) ==
De novo lipogenesis (DNL) is the process by which excess carbohydrates from the circulation are converted into fatty acids, which can be further converted into triglycerides or other lipids. Acetate and some amino acids (notably leucine and isoleucine) can also be carbon sources for DNL.

Normally, de novo lipogenesis occurs primarily in adipose tissue. But in conditions of obesity, insulin resistance, or type 2 diabetes de novo lipogenesis is reduced in adipose tissue (where carbohydrate-responsive element-binding protein (ChREBP) is the major transcription factor) and is increased in the liver (where sterol regulatory element-binding protein 1 (SREBP-1c) is the major transcription factor). ChREBP is normally activated in the liver by glucose (independent of insulin). Obesity and high-fat diets cause levels of carbohydrate-responsive element-binding protein in adipose tissue to be reduced. By contrast, high blood levels of insulin, due to a high carbohydrate meal or insulin resistance, strongly induces SREBP-1c expression in the liver. The reduction of adipose tissue de novo lipogenesis, and the increase in liver de novo lipogenesis due to obesity and insulin resistance leads to fatty liver disease.

Fructose consumption (in contrast to glucose) activates both SREBP-1c and ChREBP in an insulin independent manner. Although glucose can be converted into glycogen in the liver, fructose invariably increases de novo lipogenesis in the liver, elevating plasma triglycerides, more than glucose. Moreover, when equal amounts of glucose or fructose sweetened beverages are consumed, the fructose beverage not only causes a greater increase in plasma triglycerides, but causes a greater increase in abdominal fat.

DNL is elevated in metabolic dysfunction–associated steatotic liver disease (NAFLD), and is a hallmark of the disease. Compared with healthy controls, patients with NAFLD have an average 3.5-fold increase in DNL.

De novo fatty-acid synthesis is regulated by two important enzymes, namely acetyl-CoA carboxylase and fatty acid synthase. The enzyme acetyl CoA carboxylase is responsible for introducing a carboxyl group to acetyl CoA, rendering malonyl-CoA. Then, the enzyme fatty-acid synthase is responsible for turning malonlyl-CoA into fatty-acid chain. De novo fatty-acid synthesis is mainly not active in human cells, since diet is the major source for it. Thus, it is considered to be a minor contributor to the serum lipid homeostasis. In mice, FA de novo synthesis increases in WAT with the exposure to cold temperatures which might be important for maintenance of circulating TAG levels in the blood stream, and to supply FA for thermogenesis during prolonged cold exposures.

== DNA ==
De novo DNA synthesis refers to the synthetic creation of DNA rather than assembly or modification of natural precursor template DNA sequences. Initial oligonucleotide synthesis is followed by artificial gene synthesis, and finally by a process of cloning, error correction, and verification, which often involves cloning the genes into plasmids in Escherichia coli or yeast.

Primase is an RNA polymerase, and it can add a primer to an existing strand awaiting replication. DNA polymerase cannot add primers, and therefore, needs primase to add the primer de novo.
