= MLX (gene) =

Protein-coding gene in the species Homo sapiens

Identifiers
- Aliases: MLX, MAD7, MXD7, TCFL4, bHLHd13, MAX dimerization protein, TF4, MAX dimerization protein MLX
- External IDs: OMIM: 602976; MGI: 108398; GeneCards: MLX

Gene location (Human)
Chr.	Chromosome 17 (human)
Band	17q21.2	Start	42,567,072 bp
Band	17q21.2	End	42,573,239 bp

Gene location (Mouse)
Chr.	Chromosome 11 (mouse)
Band	11|11 D	Start	100,978,103 bp
Band	11|11 D	End	100,983,033 bp
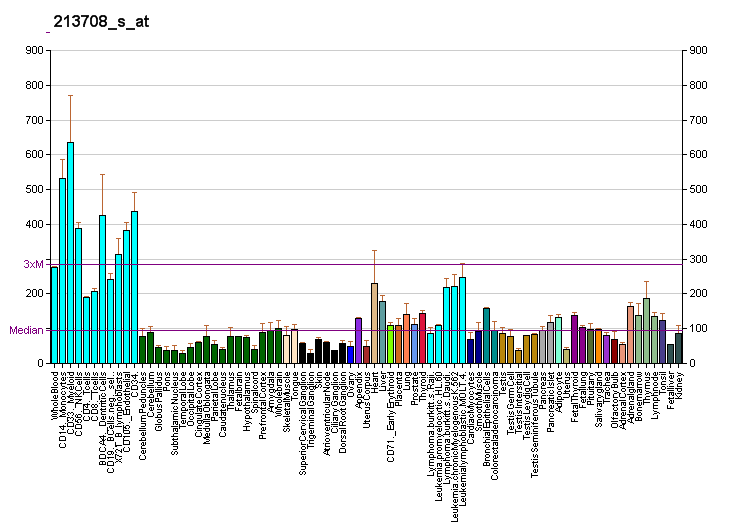

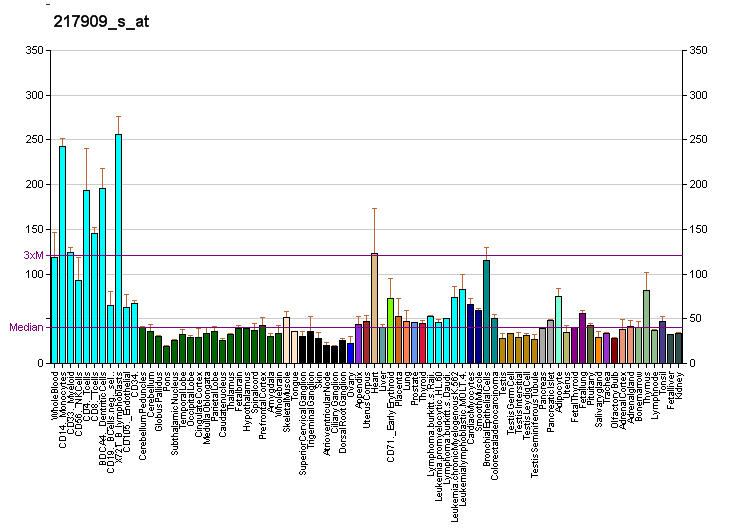

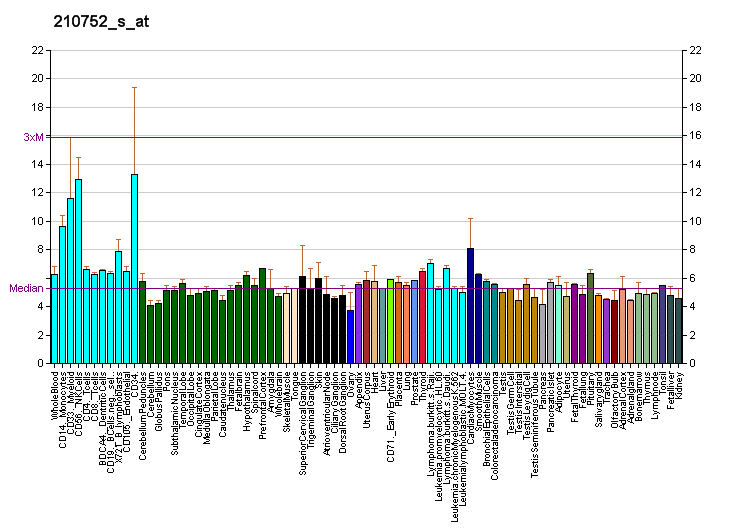
RNA expression pattern
Bgee	Human / Mouse (ortholog); Top expressed in: oocyte; secondary oocyte; parotid gland; duodenum; mucosa of transverse colon; apex of heart; mucosa of sigmoid colon; jejunal mucosa; mucosa of ileum; rectum / Top expressed in: right kidney; granulocyte; duodenum; jejunum; proximal tubule; colon; yolk sac; left colon; thymus; stomach; More reference expression data
BioGPS	More reference expression data
Gene ontology
Molecular function	DNA-binding transcription factor activity; transcription factor binding; RNA polymerase II transcription regulatory region sequence-specific DNA binding; protein binding; protein homodimerization activity; DNA-binding transcription repressor activity, RNA polymerase II-specific; protein dimerization activity; protein heterodimerization activity; DNA binding; DNA-binding transcription factor activity, RNA polymerase II-specific
Cellular component	nucleus; cytoplasm; nucleoplasm; cytosol; nuclear membrane
Biological process	negative regulation of transcription, DNA-templated; negative regulation of transcription by RNA polymerase II; transcription, DNA-templated; regulation of transcription, DNA-templated; positive regulation of transcription by RNA polymerase II; regulation of transcription by RNA polymerase II
Sources:Amigo / QuickGO
Orthologs
Databases	NCBI: entry; OMA: entry
Species	Human	Mouse
Entrez	6945	21428
Ensembl	ENSG00000108788	ENSMUSG00000017801
UniProt	Q9UH92	O08609
RefSeq (mRNA)	NM_198205; NM_170607; NM_198204; NM_013383; NM_170608	NM_001159384; NM_001159385; NM_011550
RefSeq (protein)	NP_733752; NP_937847; NP_937848	NP_001152856; NP_001152857; NP_035680
Location (UCSC)	Chr 17: 42.57 – 42.57 Mb	Chr 11: 100.98 – 100.98 Mb
PubMed search
- Wikidata
View/Edit Human	View/Edit Mouse

Max-like protein X is a protein that in humans is encoded by the MLX gene.

== Function ==
The product of this gene belongs to the family of basic helix-loop-helix leucine zipper (bHLH-Zip) transcription factors. These factors form heterodimers with Mad proteins and play a role in proliferation, determination and differentiation. This gene product may act to diversify Mad family function by its restricted association with a subset of the Mad family of transcriptional repressors, namely Mad1 and Mad4. Alternatively spliced transcript variants encoding different isoforms have been identified for this gene.

== Interactions ==
MLX (gene) has been shown to interact with MNT, MXD1 and MLXIPL.

MLX must dimerize with MondoA or with MLXIPL (carbohydrate-responsive element-binding protein) to regulate target genes.
