= Fibroblast growth factor 21 =

Protein-coding gene in mammals

FGF21
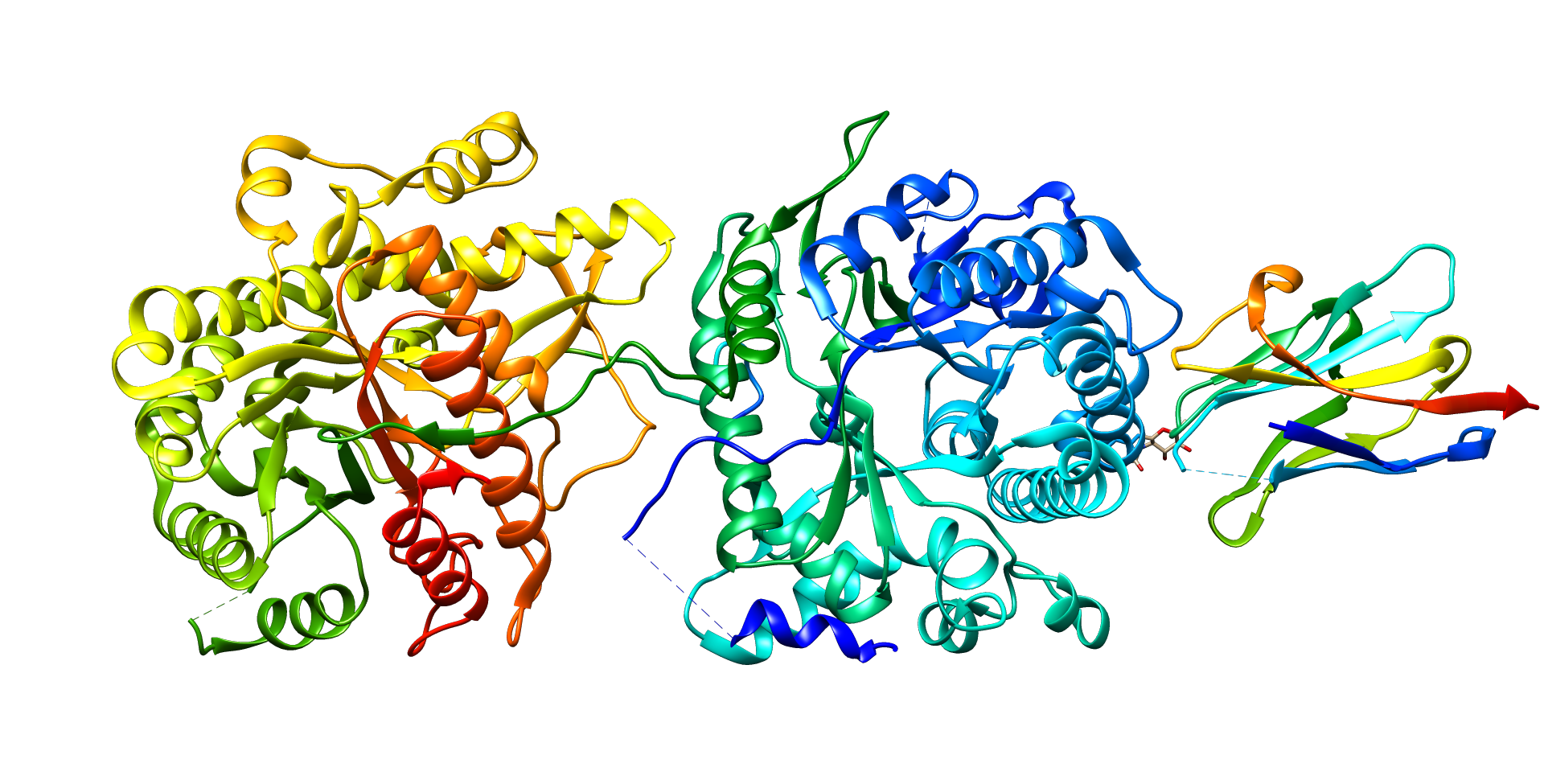

Identifiers
- Aliases: FGF21, fibroblast growth factor 21
- External IDs: OMIM: 609436; MGI: 1861377; GeneCards: FGF21
Available structures
PDB	Ortholog search: PDBe RCSB
PDB	List of PDB id codes 5VAQ, 6M6F, 6M6E

Gene location (Human)
Chr.	Chromosome 19 (human)
Band	19q13.33	Start	48,755,524 bp
Band	19q13.33	End	48,758,333 bp

Gene location (Mouse)
Chr.	Chromosome 7 (mouse)
Band	7|7 B3	Start	45,263,310 bp
Band	7|7 B3	End	45,264,914 bp
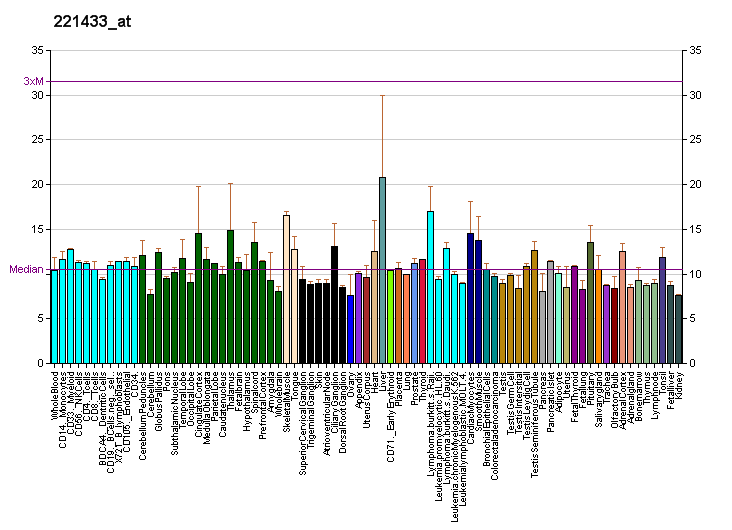
RNA expression pattern
Bgee	Human / Mouse (ortholog); Top expressed in: right lobe of liver; pancreatic ductal cell; muscle of thigh; breast; mammary gland; lactiferous gland; gastrocnemius muscle; head; mouth; blood / Top expressed in: pyloric antrum; embryo; thymus; calvaria; liver; islet of Langerhans; left lobe of liver; axial skeleton; cornea; spermatid; More reference expression data
BioGPS	More reference expression data
Gene ontology
Molecular function	growth factor activity; protein binding; fibroblast growth factor receptor binding
Cellular component	extracellular region; extracellular space
Biological process	endothelial cell apoptotic process; positive regulation of MAPKKK cascade by fibroblast growth factor receptor signaling pathway; positive regulation of ERK1 and ERK2 cascade; positive regulation of cell population proliferation; positive regulation of glucose import; cell-cell signaling; cellular response to glucose stimulus; fibroblast growth factor receptor signaling pathway; regulation of low-density lipoprotein particle clearance; response to nutrient levels; negative regulation of endothelial cell apoptotic process; response to activity; signal transduction; cellular response to low-density lipoprotein particle stimulus; endoplasmic reticulum unfolded protein response; negative regulation of neuron death; positive regulation of triglyceride catabolic process; response to methionine; cellular response to glucagon stimulus; regulation of signaling receptor activity; positive regulation of cold-induced thermogenesis
Sources:Amigo / QuickGO
Orthologs
Databases	NCBI: entry; OMA: entry
Species	Human	Mouse
Entrez	26291	56636
Ensembl	ENSG00000105550	ENSMUSG00000030827
UniProt	Q9NSA1	Q9JJN1
RefSeq (mRNA)	NM_019113	NM_020013
RefSeq (protein)	NP_061986	NP_064397
Location (UCSC)	Chr 19: 48.76 – 48.76 Mb	Chr 7: 45.26 – 45.26 Mb
PubMed search
- Wikidata
View/Edit Human	View/Edit Mouse

Fibroblast growth factor 21 (FGF-21) is a protein found in humans and other mammals that is encoded by the FGF21 gene. This protein is a member of the fibroblast growth factor (FGF) family and its endocrine subfamily along with FGF23 and FGF15/19. FGF21 is the primary endogenous agonist of the FGF21 receptor, which is composed of the FGF receptor and co-receptor β-Klotho.

Members of the FGF family are broad-spectrum mitogens important to survival activities. FGFs are involved in biological processes throughout the body including embryonic development, cell growth, morphogenesis, tissue repair, tumor growth and invasion. FGFs act through a family of four FGF receptors. Binding is complicated and requires both interaction of the FGF molecule with an FGF receptor and binding to heparin through a heparin binding domain. Endocrine FGFs lack a heparin binding domain and thus can be released into the circulation.

FGF21 is a hepatokine, a hormone secreted primarily by the liver as shown by the Potthoff lab. Among other activities, FGF21 regulates simple sugar intake and preferences for sweet foods via signaling through FGF21 receptors in the hypothalamus and correlates with reduced dopamine neurotransmission within the nucleus accumbens. The Potthoff lab followed up on their discovery and later revealed that FGF21 signaling to the ventromedial hypothalamus suppresses sugar intake by enhancing the activity of glucose-excited and glucose-inhibited neurons in response to high, but not low, glucose levels. The Potthoff lab was also the first to demonstrate that FGF21 has direct actions on adipose tissues, where it can increase acute insulin sensitivity and glucose uptake. Initially thought of as a starvation hormone, FGF21 is now described as "an endocrine mediator of the intracellular stress response to various nutritional manipulations, including excess sugars and alcohol, caloric deficits, a ketogenic diet, and amino acid restriction".

A single-nucleotide polymorphism of the FGF21 gene – the FGF21 rs838133 variant (frequency 44.7%) – has been identified as a genetic mechanism responsible for the sweet tooth behavioral phenotype, a trait associated with cravings for sweets and high sugar consumption, in both humans and mice.

== Regulation ==
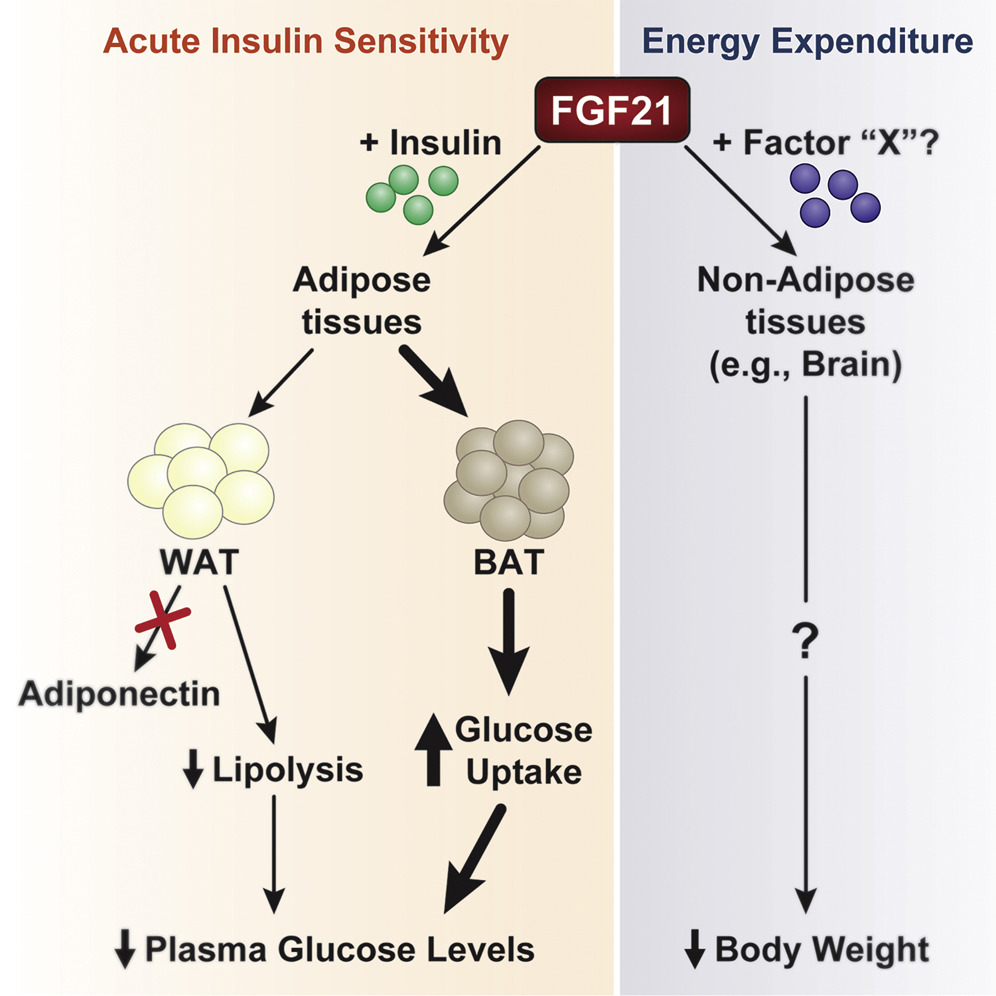
Mechanisms for FGF21-mediated regulation of metabolism in adipose and non-adipose tissues

FGF21 has multiple sites of action in both the brain, where it acts to restrain intake of sweets and alcohol, and the periphery, where it acts to increase energy expenditure and body temperature. Initially, FGF21 was thought of as a starvation hormone. FGF21 induction is termed paradoxical because FGF21 is induced both by fasting signals (PPARα and glucagon) and feeding signals (glucose and xylitol). This suggests that FGF21 is involved in adapting to multiple states of nutritional crisis, including both starvation and overfeeding. FGF21 is now described as a "master sensitizer", modulating specific hormonal signals to regulate metabolism and reestablish energy and nutrient homeostasis. A proposed mechanism to resolve paradoxes of FGF21 induction in liver is that glycerol-3-phosphate activates carbohydrate response element binding protein, which can explain induction via weight loss, exercise, ketogenic diet and starvation (via glycerol kinase), mitochondrial disease, NADH shuttle disruption and ethanol (via glycerol-3-phosphate dehydrogenase), and by excess of simple carbohydrates including fructose.

FGF21 is expressed in numerous tissues, including liver, brown adipose tissue (BAT), white adipose tissue (WAT) and pancreas. Circulating levels of FGF21 are derived primarily from the liver in both mice and humans. FGF21 levels in tissues tend to be basally low and expression can be induced by many different signals of nutritional and cellular stress. Response varies according to both tissue and nutritional context. Transcriptional regulation is critical for FGF21 expression, but the regulation of circulating FGF21 also depends on mechanisms for the secretion and transport of FGF21.

Several signaling mechanisms for hepatic FGF21 have been described. Two of the key transcription factors are Peroxisome proliferator-activated receptor alpha (PPARα) and Carbohydrate-responsive element-binding protein (ChREBP). In addition, β-Klotho (KLB) is vital for FGFR activation, acting as a co‑receptor for the binding of FGF21. The regulation of FGF21 expression in the liver is also mediated by transcription factors such as ATF4 and NRF.

The FGF21 metabolic pathway responds to signals from adipose tissue, liver, and mitochondria. Hepatogenic FGF21 is released into the bloodstream, and can cross the blood-brain barrier. In the central nervous system (CNS), FGF21 interacts with its receptor complex, which contains both fibroblast growth factor receptor (e.g. FGFR1) and co-receptor (β-Klotho). The FGF21 receptor complex is found in brain regions such as the hypothalamus and hindbrain. Transcription factor PPARα mediates FGF21 secretion in the liver in response to fasting and high-fat diets. PPARα is also an intermediate in the upstream regulation of FGF21. Transcription factor ChREBP can stimulate hepatogenic FGF21 expression under conditions such as high carbohydrate intake. FGF21 mRNA is up-regulated under conditions of protein malnutrition.

In this way signals are transmitted from the peripheral tissues to the brain, where they act in a variety of ways to influence regulation of metabolism and energy balance. Major functions of FGF21 in regulating nutrient and energy homeostasis include the enhancement of insulin sensitivity, increases in energy expenditure and weight loss, decreases in hepatic triglycerides and regulation of macronutrient preferences. Liver-derived FGF21 has been studied under nutritional conditions including fasting, ketogenic diet, protein restriction, high-carbohydrate diet, and consumption of alcohol.

== Function ==
FGF21 was first identified as a major metabolic regulator based on its ability to lower glucose and lipid levels in rodents. FGF21 stimulates glucose uptake in adipocytes but not in other cell types. This effect is additive to the activity of insulin. FGF21 treatment of adipocytes is associated with phosphorylation of FRS2, a protein linking FGF receptors to the Ras/MAP kinase pathway. FGF21 injection in ob/ob mice results in an increase in Glut1 in adipose tissue. FGF21 also protects animals from diet-induced obesity when overexpressed in transgenic mice and lowers blood glucose and triglyceride levels when administered to diabetic rodents. Treatment of animals with FGF21 results in increased energy expenditure, fat utilization and lipid excretion.

In cows, plasma FGF21 was nearly undetectable in late pregnancy (LP), peaked at parturition, and then stabilized at lower, chronically elevated concentrations during early lactation (EL). Plasma FGF21 was similarly increased in the absence of parturition when an energy-deficit state was induced by feed restricting late-lactating dairy cows, implicating energy insufficiency as a cause of chronically elevated FGF21 in EL. The liver was the major source of plasma FGF21 in early lactation with little or no contribution by WAT, skeletal muscle, and mammary gland. Meaningful expression of the FGF21 coreceptor β-Klotho was restricted to liver and WAT in a survey of 15 tissues that included the mammary gland. Expression of β-Klotho and its subset of interacting FGF receptors was modestly affected by the transition from LP to EL in liver but not in WAT.

== Clinical significance ==
Serum FGF-21 levels were significantly increased in patients with type 2 diabetes mellitus (T2DM) which may indicate a role in the pathogenesis of T2DM. Elevated levels also correlate with liver fat content in non-alcoholic fatty liver disease and positively correlate with BMI in humans suggesting obesity as a FGF21-resistant state.

A single-nucleotide polymorphism (SNP) of the FGF21 gene – the FGF21 rs838133 variant (frequency 44.7%) – has been identified as a genetic mechanism responsible for the sweet tooth behavioral phenotype, a trait associated with cravings for sweets and high sugar consumption, in both humans and mice.

== Animal studies ==
Mice lacking FGF21 fail to fully induce PGC-1α expression in response to a prolonged fast and have impaired gluconeogenesis and ketogenesis.

FGF21 stimulates phosphorylation of fibroblast growth factor receptor substrate 2 and ERK1/2 in the liver. Acute FGF21 treatment induced hepatic expression of key regulators of gluconeogenesis, lipid metabolism, and ketogenesis including glucose-6-phosphatase, phosphoenol pyruvate carboxykinase, 3-hydroxybutyrate dehydrogenase type 1, and carnitine palmitoyltransferase 1α. In addition, injection of FGF21 was associated with decreased circulating insulin and free fatty acid levels. FGF21 treatment induced mRNA and protein expression of PGC-1α, but in mice PGC-1α expression was not necessary for the effect of FGF21 on glucose metabolism.

In mice FGF21 is strongly induced in liver by prolonged fasting via PPAR-alpha and in turn induces the transcriptional coactivator PGC-1α and stimulates hepatic gluconeogenesis, fatty acid oxidation, and ketogenesis. FGF21 also blocks somatic growth and sensitizes mice to a hibernation-like state of torpor, playing a key role in eliciting and coordinating the adaptive starvation response. FGF21 expression is also induced in white adipose tissue by PPAR-gamma, which may indicate it also regulates metabolism in the fed state. FGF21 is induced in both rodents and humans consuming a low protein diet. FGF21 expression is also induced by diets with reduced levels of the essential dietary amino acids methionine or threonine, or with reduced levels of branched-chain amino acids.

Activation of AMPK and SIRT1 by FGF21 in adipocytes enhanced mitochondrial oxidative capacity as demonstrated by increases in oxygen consumption, citrate synthase activity, and induction of key metabolic genes. The effects of FGF21 on mitochondrial function require serine/threonine kinase 11 (STK11/LKB1), which activates AMPK. Inhibition of AMPK, SIRT1, and PGC-1α activities attenuated the effects of FGF21 on oxygen consumption and gene expression, indicating that FGF21 regulates mitochondrial activity and enhances oxidative capacity through an LKB1-AMPK-SIRT1-PGC-1α-dependent mechanism in adipocytes, resulting in increased phosphorylation of AMPK, increased cellular NAD+ levels and activation of SIRT1 and deacetylation of SIRT1 targets PGC-1α and histone 3.

Acutely, the rise in FGF21 in response to alcohol consumption inhibits further drinking. Chronically, the rise in FGF21 expression in the liver may protect against liver damage.
