= Ob/ob mouse =

Mutant mouse that eats excessively and becomes profoundly obese

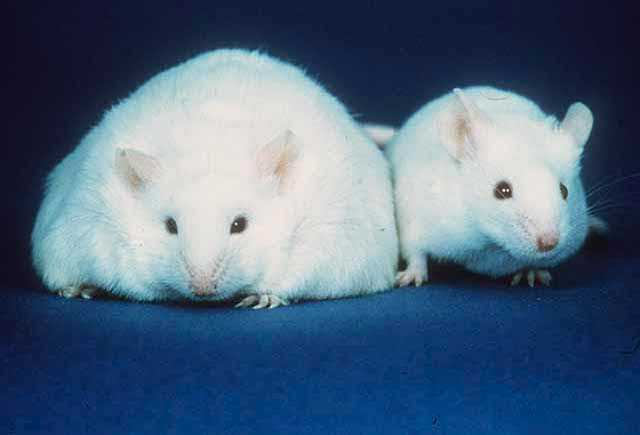
A comparison of a mouse unable to produce leptin thus resulting in obesity (left) and a normal mouse (right)

The ob/ob or obese mouse is a mutant mouse that eats excessively due to mutations in the gene responsible for the production of leptin and becomes profoundly obese. It is an animal model of type II diabetes. Identification of the gene mutated in ob led to the discovery of the hormone leptin, which is important in the control of appetite.

The first ob/ob mouse arose by chance in a colony at the Jackson Laboratory in 1949. The mutation is recessive. Mutant mice are phenotypically indistinguishable from their unaffected littermates at birth, but gain weight rapidly throughout their lives, reaching a weight three times that of unaffected mice. ob/ob mice develop high blood sugar, despite an enlargement of the pancreatic islets and increased levels of insulin.

The gene affected by the ob mutation was identified by positional cloning. The gene produces a hormone, called leptin, that is produced predominantly in adipose tissue. One role of leptin is to regulate appetite by signalling to the brain that the animal has had enough to eat. Since the ob/ob mouse cannot produce leptin, its food intake is uncontrolled by this mechanism.

A positional cloning approach in the Lep^{ob} mouse allows to identify the locus of the gene encoding for the ob protein. Clones were used to construct a contig across most of the 650-kb critical region of ob. Exons from this interval were trapped using exon trapping method and each was afterward sequenced and searched in the GenBank. One of the exons was hybridized to a Northern blot of mouse white adipose tissue (WAT). This allowed to investigate the levels of ob gene expression which seemed to be markedly increased in WAT of Lep^{ob} mice. This is consistent with a biologically inactive truncated protein.

== See also ==
- Zucker rat
