= MXI1 =

Protein-coding gene in humans

Identifiers
- Aliases: MXI1, MAD2, MXD2, MXI, bHLHc11, MAX interactor 1, dimerization protein
- External IDs: OMIM: 600020; MGI: 97245; GeneCards: MXI1

Gene location (Human)
Chr.	Chromosome 10 (human)
Band	10q25.2	Start	110,207,605 bp
Band	10q25.2	End	110,287,365 bp

Gene location (Mouse)
Chr.	Chromosome 19 (mouse)
Band	19 D2|19 47.53 cM	Start	53,298,949 bp
Band	19 D2|19 47.53 cM	End	53,364,241 bp
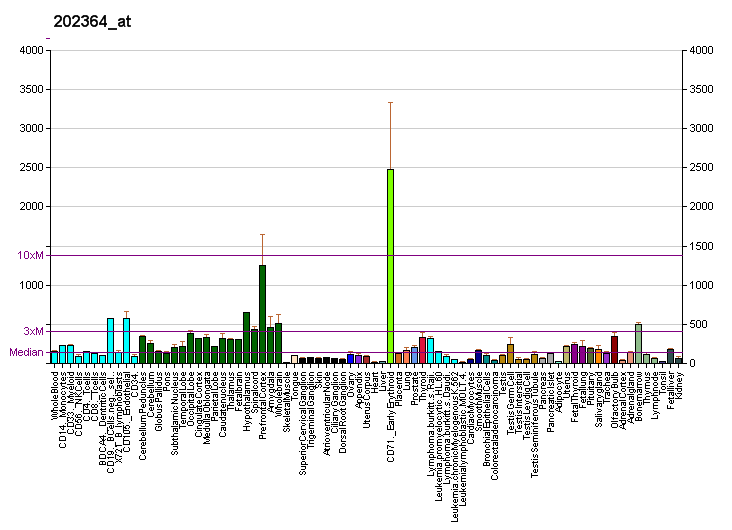
RNA expression pattern
Bgee	Human / Mouse (ortholog); Top expressed in: optic nerve; Achilles tendon; corpus callosum; inferior ganglion of vagus nerve; trabecular bone; parotid gland; middle frontal gyrus; subthalamic nucleus; external globus pallidus; postcentral gyrus / Top expressed in: blood; cerebellar vermis; molar; lobe of cerebellum; epithelium of small intestine; granulocyte; median eminence; olfactory epithelium; pontine nuclei; medial geniculate nucleus; More reference expression data
BioGPS	More reference expression data
Gene ontology
Molecular function	DNA binding; protein binding; protein dimerization activity; transcription corepressor activity; RNA polymerase II transcription regulatory region sequence-specific DNA binding; DNA-binding transcription repressor activity, RNA polymerase II-specific; DNA-binding transcription factor activity, RNA polymerase II-specific
Cellular component	nucleolus; nucleus; cytosol; RNA polymerase II transcription regulator complex
Biological process	cytoplasmic sequestering of transcription factor; regulation of transcription, DNA-templated; transcription, DNA-templated; negative regulation of cell population proliferation; negative regulation of transcription by RNA polymerase II
Sources:Amigo / QuickGO
Orthologs
Databases	NCBI: entry; OMA: entry
Species	Human	Mouse
Entrez	4601	17859
Ensembl	ENSG00000119950	ENSMUSG00000025025
UniProt	P50539	P50540
RefSeq (mRNA)	NM_130439; NM_001008541; NM_005962	NM_001008542; NM_001008543; NM_010847; NM_001360345; NM_001360346 NM_001360347; NM_001360348
RefSeq (protein)	NP_001008541; NP_005953; NP_569157	NP_001008542; NP_001008543; NP_034977; NP_001347274; NP_001347275 NP_001347276; NP_001347277
Location (UCSC)	Chr 10: 110.21 – 110.29 Mb	Chr 19: 53.3 – 53.36 Mb
PubMed search
- Wikidata
View/Edit Human	View/Edit Mouse

MAX-interacting protein 1 is a protein that in humans is encoded by the MXI1 gene.

== Function ==
Expression of the c-myc gene, which produces an oncogenic transcription factor, is tightly regulated in normal cells but is frequently deregulated in human cancers. The protein encoded by this gene is a transcriptional repressor thought to negatively regulate MYC function, and is therefore a potential tumor suppressor. This protein inhibits the transcriptional activity of MYC by competing for MAX, another basic helix-loop-helix protein that binds to MYC and is required for its function. Defects in this gene are frequently found in patients with prostate tumors. Three alternatively spliced transcripts encoding different isoforms have been described. Additional alternatively spliced transcripts may exist but the products of these transcripts have not been verified experimentally.

== Interactions ==
MXI1 has been shown to interact with SMC3 and MAX.
