= MYCL =

Protein-coding gene in humans

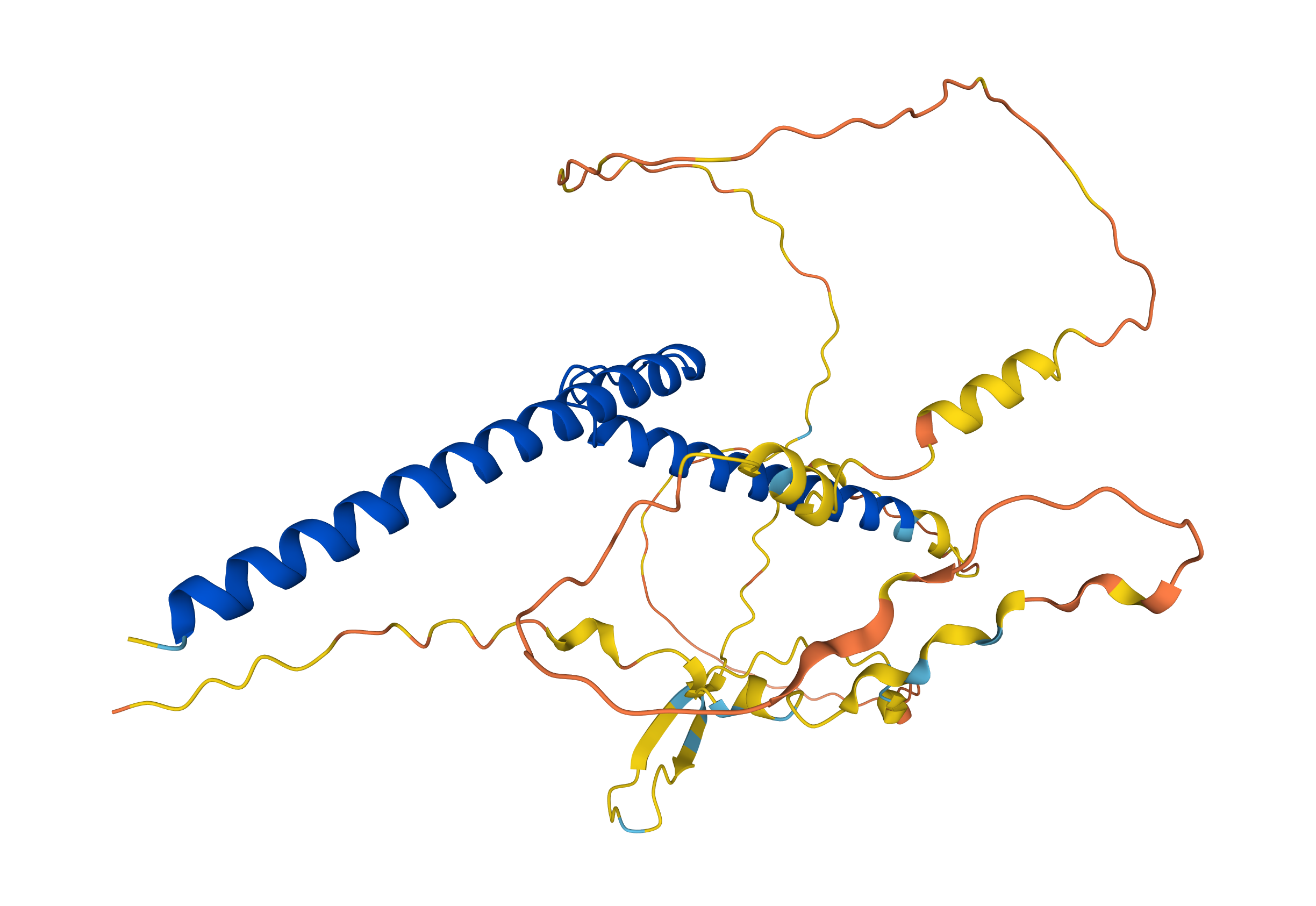

Identifiers
- Aliases: MYCL, LMYC, MYCL1, bHLHe38, L-Myc, v-myc avian myelocytomatosis viral oncogene lung carcinoma derived homolog, MYCL proto-oncogene, bHLH transcription factor
- External IDs: OMIM: 164850; MGI: 96799; GeneCards: MYCL

Gene location (Human)
Chr.	Chromosome 1 (human)
Band	1p34.2	Start	39,895,426 bp
Band	1p34.2	End	39,902,256 bp

Gene location (Mouse)
Chr.	Chromosome 4 (mouse)
Band	4 D2.2|4 57.36 cM	Start	122,889,445 bp
Band	4 D2.2|4 57.36 cM	End	122,896,278 bp
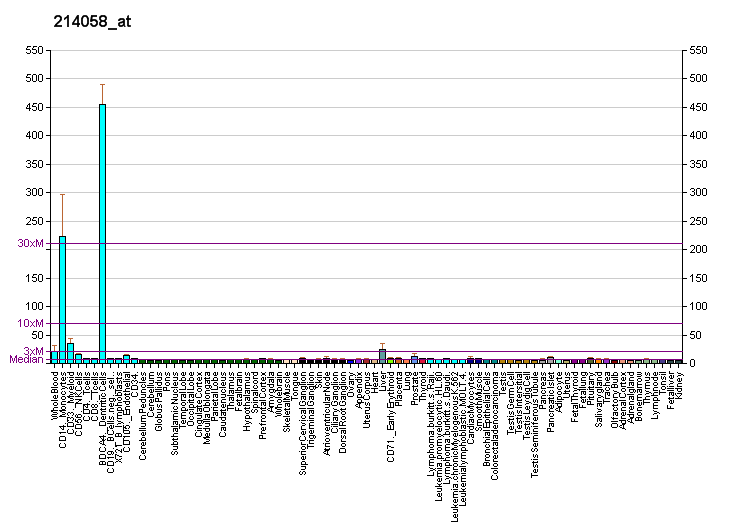

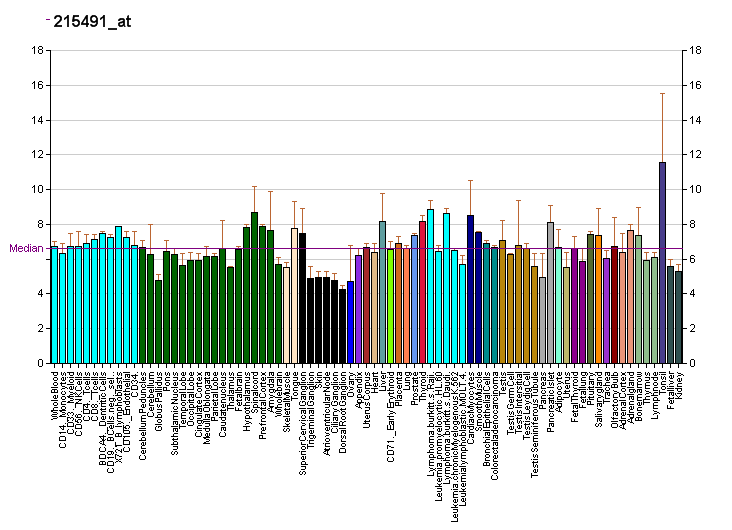
RNA expression pattern
Bgee	Human / Mouse (ortholog); Top expressed in: monocyte; skin of leg; epithelium of esophagus; skin of abdomen; skin of thigh; granulocyte; body of pancreas; mucosa of urinary bladder; gonad; gums / Top expressed in: transitional epithelium of urinary bladder; corneal stroma; hair follicle; ventricular zone; ganglionic eminence; tail of embryo; white matter of cerebellum; genital tubercle; lip; medial ganglionic eminence; More reference expression data
BioGPS	More reference expression data
Gene ontology
Molecular function	DNA-binding transcription factor activity; protein dimerization activity; DNA binding; DNA-binding transcription factor activity, RNA polymerase II-specific; RNA polymerase II cis-regulatory region sequence-specific DNA binding; DNA-binding transcription activator activity, RNA polymerase II-specific
Cellular component	nucleus
Biological process	regulation of transcription, DNA-templated; regulation of inner ear auditory receptor cell differentiation; regulation of transcription by RNA polymerase II; positive regulation of transcription by RNA polymerase II
Sources:Amigo / QuickGO
Orthologs
Databases	NCBI: entry; OMA: entry
Species	Human	Mouse
Entrez	4610	16918
Ensembl	ENSG00000116990	ENSMUSG00000028654
UniProt	P12524	P10166
RefSeq (mRNA)	NM_005376; NM_001033081; NM_001033082	NM_008506; NM_001303121
RefSeq (protein)	NP_001028253; NP_001028254; NP_005367	NP_001290050; NP_032532
Location (UCSC)	Chr 1: 39.9 – 39.9 Mb	Chr 4: 122.89 – 122.9 Mb
PubMed search
- Wikidata
View/Edit Human	View/Edit Mouse

L-myc-1 proto-oncogene protein is a protein that in humans is encoded by the MYCL1 gene.

MYCL1 is a bHLH (basic helix-loop-helix) transcription factor implicated in lung cancer.

== Interactions ==
MYCL1 has been shown to interact with MAX.
