= Myc =

Family of regulator genes

Myc is a family of regulator genes and proto-oncogenes that code for transcription factors. The Myc family consists of three related human genes: c-myc (MYC), l-myc (MYCL), and n-myc (MYCN). c-myc (also sometimes referred to as MYC) was the first gene to be discovered in this family, due to homology with the viral gene v-myc.

In the human genome, c-myc is located on chromosome 8 and is believed to regulate expression of 15% of all genes through binding on enhancer box sequences (E-boxes). c-Myc also plays an important role in stem cell biology and was one of the original Yamanaka factors used to reprogram somatic cells into induced pluripotent stem cells. In addition to its role as a classical transcription factor, N-myc may recruit histone acetyltransferases (HATs). This allows it to regulate global chromatin structure via histone acetylation.

In cancer, c-myc is often constitutively (persistently) expressed. This leads to the increased expression of many genes, some of which are involved in cell proliferation, contributing to the formation of cancer. A common human translocation involving c-myc is critical to the development of most cases of Burkitt lymphoma. Constitutive upregulation of Myc genes have also been observed in carcinoma of the cervix, colon, breast, lung and stomach. Myc is thus viewed as a promising target for anti-cancer drugs. Unfortunately, Myc possesses several features that have rendered it difficult to drug to date, such that any anti-cancer drugs aimed at inhibiting Myc may continue to require perturbing the protein indirectly, such as by targeting the mRNA for the protein rather than via a small molecule that targets the protein itself.

== Genes ==
In humans, the Myc family comprises three paralogous proto-oncogenes: MYC, MYCN, and MYCL. They encode the transcription factors c-Myc, N-Myc, and L-Myc, respectively.

MYC proto-oncogene, bHLH transcription factor

Identifiers
- Symbol: MYC
- Alt. symbols: c-Myc, v-myc
- NCBI gene: 4609
- HGNC: 7553
- OMIM: 190080
- RefSeq: NM_001354870.1
- UniProt: P01106

Other data
- Locus: Chr. 8 q24.21
- Wikidata: Q20969939
Search for
- Structures: Swiss-model
- Domains: InterPro

MYCL proto-oncogene, bHLH transcription factor

Identifiers
- Symbol: MYCL
- Alt. symbols: LMYC, MYCL1, bHLHe38, L-Myc, v-myc
- NCBI gene: 4610
- HGNC: 7555
- OMIM: 164850
- RefSeq: NM_005376
- UniProt: P12524

Other data
- Locus: Chr. 1 p34.2
- Wikidata: Q18029714
Search for
- Structures: Swiss-model
- Domains: InterPro

MYCN proto-oncogene, bHLH transcription factor

Identifiers
- Symbol: MYCN
- NCBI gene: 4613
- HGNC: 7559
- OMIM: 164840
- RefSeq: NM_005378
- UniProt: V

Other data
- Locus: Chr. 2 p24.3
- Wikidata: Q14906753
Search for
- Structures: Swiss-model
- Domains: InterPro

== Protein structure and processing ==
The protein products of Myc family genes all belong to the Myc family of transcription factors. This structure is made of two domains called the N-terminal transactivation domain and C-terminal DNA-binding domain along with hundreds of amino acids. The C-terminal domain contains bHLH (basic helix-loop-helix) and LZ (leucine zipper) structural motifs. The bHLH motif allows Myc proteins to bind with DNA, while the leucine zipper TF-binding motif allows dimerization with Max, another bHLH transcription factor.

Myc mRNA contains an IRES (internal ribosome entry site) that allows the RNA to be translated into protein when 5' cap-dependent translation is inhibited, such as during viral infection.

=== Myc-nick ===
Myc-Nick

Myc-nick is a cytoplasmic form of Myc produced by a partial proteolytic cleavage of full-length c-Myc and N-Myc. Myc cleavage is mediated by the calpain family of calcium-dependent cytosolic proteases.

The cleavage of Myc by calpains is a constitutive process but is enhanced under conditions that require rapid downregulation of Myc levels, such as during terminal differentiation. Upon cleavage, the C-terminus of Myc (containing the DNA binding domain) is degraded, while Myc-nick, the N-terminal segment 298-residue segment remains in the cytoplasm. Myc-nick contains binding domains for histone acetyltransferases and for ubiquitin ligases.

The functions of Myc-nick are currently under investigation, but this new Myc family member was found to regulate cell morphology, at least in part, by interacting with acetyl transferases to promote the acetylation of α-tubulin. Ectopic expression of Myc-nick accelerates the differentiation of committed myoblasts into muscle cells.

== Function ==
Myc proteins are transcription factors that activate expression of many pro-proliferative genes through binding enhancer box sequences (E-boxes) and recruiting histone acetyltransferases (HATs). Myc is thought to function by upregulating transcript elongation of actively transcribed genes through the recruitment of transcriptional elongation factors. It can also act as a transcriptional repressor. By binding Miz-1 transcription factor and displacing the p300 co-activator, it inhibits expression of Miz-1 target genes. In addition, myc has a direct role in the control of DNA replication. This activity could contribute to DNA amplification in cancer cells.

Myc is activated upon various mitogenic signals such as serum stimulation or by Wnt, Shh and EGF (via the MAPK/ERK pathway). By modifying the expression of its target genes, Myc activation results in numerous biological effects. The first to be discovered was its capability to drive cell proliferation (upregulates cyclins, downregulates p21), but it also plays a very important role in regulating cell growth (upregulates ribosomal RNA and proteins), apoptosis (downregulates Bcl-2), differentiation, and stem cell self-renewal. Nucleotide metabolism genes are upregulated by Myc, which are necessary for Myc induced proliferation or cell growth.

There have been several studies that have clearly indicated Myc's role in cell competition.

A major effect of c-myc is B cell proliferation, and gain of MYC has been associated with B cell malignancies and their increased aggressiveness, including histological transformation. In B cells, Myc acts as a classical oncogene by regulating a number of pro-proliferative and anti-apoptotic pathways, this also includes tuning of BCR signaling and CD40 signaling in regulation of microRNAs (miR-29, miR-150, miR-17-92).

c-Myc induces MTDH (AEG-1) gene expression and in turn itself requires AEG-1 oncogene for its expression.

=== Stem cells and reprogramming ===
Myc genes play a number of normal roles in stem cells including pluripotent stem cells. In neural stem cells, N-Myc promotes a rapidly proliferative stem cell and precursor-like state in the developing brain, while inhibiting differentiation. In hematopoietic stem cells, Myc controls the balance between self-renewal and differentiation. In particular, long-term hematopoietic stem cells (LT-HSCs) express low levels of c-Myc, ensuring self-renewal. Enforced expression of c-Myc in LT-HSCs promotes differentiation at the expense of self-renewal, resulting in stem cell exhaustion. In pathological states and specifically in acute myeloid leukemia, oxidant stress can trigger higher levels of Myc expression that affects the behavior of leukemia stem cells.

c-Myc plays a major role in the generation of induced pluripotent stem cells (iPSCs). It is one of the original factors discovered by Yamanaka et al. to encourage cells to return to a 'stem-like' state alongside transcription factors Oct4, Sox2 and Klf4. It has since been shown that it is possible to generate iPSCs without c-Myc.

== Interactions ==
c-Myc forms a heterodimer with MAX that binds E-box sequences in DNA. It also interacts with TRRAP, which recruits the histone acetyltransferase GCN5, and with P-TEFb, which promotes transcriptional elongation.

Binding to WDR5 helps c-Myc recognize a subset of its target genes. Association with Miz-1 can repress transcription of genes such as CDKN2B, which encodes the cell-cycle inhibitor p15.

== Clinical significance ==
A large body of evidence shows that Myc genes and proteins are highly relevant for treating tumors. Except for early response genes, Myc universally upregulates gene expression. Furthermore, the upregulation is nonlinear. Genes for which expression is already significantly upregulated in the absence of Myc are strongly boosted in the presence of Myc, whereas genes for which expression is low in the absence Myc get only a small boost when Myc is present.

Inactivation of SUMO-activating enzyme (SAE1 / SAE2) in the presence of Myc hyperactivation results in mitotic catastrophe and cell death in cancer cells. Hence inhibitors of SUMOylation may be a possible treatment for cancer.

Amplification of the MYC gene was found in a significant number of epithelial ovarian cancer cases. In TCGA datasets, the amplification of Myc occurs in several cancer types, including breast, colorectal, pancreatic, gastric, and uterine cancers.

In the experimental transformation process of normal cells into cancer cells, the MYC gene can cooperate with the RAS gene.

Expression of Myc is highly dependent on BRD4 function in some cancers. BET inhibitors have been used to successfully block Myc function in pre-clinical cancer models and are currently being evaluated in clinical trials.

MYC expression is controlled by a wide variety of noncoding RNAs, including miRNA, lncRNA, and circRNA. Some of these RNAs have been shown to be specific for certain types of human tissues and tumors. Changes in the expression of such RNAs can potentially be used to develop targeted tumor therapy.

=== MYC rearrangements ===
MYC chromosomal rearrangements (MYC-R) occur in 10% to 15% of diffuse large B-cell lymphoma (DLBCLs), an aggressive Non-Hodgkin Lymphoma (NHL). Patients with MYC-R have inferior outcomes and can be classified as single-hit, when they only have MYC-R; as double hit when the rearrangement is accompanied by a translocation of BCL2 or BCL6; and as triple hit when MYC-R includes both BCL2 and BCL6. Double and triple hit lymphoma have been recently classified as high-grade B-cell lymphoma (HGBCL) and it is associated with a poor prognosis.

MYC-R in DLBCL/HGBCL is believed to arise through the aberrant activity of activation-induced cytidine deaminase (AICDA), which facilitates somatic hypermutation (SHM) and class-switch recombination (CSR). Although AICDA primarily targets IG loci for SHM and CSR, its off-target mutagenic effects can impact lymphoma-associated oncogenes like MYC, potentially leading to oncogenic rearrangements. The breakpoints in MYC rearrangements show considerable variability within the MYC region. These breakpoints may occur within the so-called "genic cluster," a region spanning approximately 1.5 kb upstream of the transcription start site, as well as the first exon and intron of MYC.

Fluorescence in situ hybridization (FISH) has become a routine practice in many clinical laboratories for lymphoma characterization. A break-apart (BAP) FISH probe is commonly utilized for the detection of MYC-R due to the variability of breakpoints in the MYC locus and the diversity of rearrangement partners, including immunoglobulin (IG) and non-IG partners (i.e. BCL2/BCL6). The MYC BAP probe includes a red and a green probe which hybridize 5' and 3' to the MYC gen, respectively. In an intact MYC locus, these probes yield a fusion signal. When MYC-R occur, two types of signals can be observed:

- Balanced patterns: These patterns present separate red and green signals.
- Unbalanced patterns: When isolated red or green signals in the absence of the corresponding green or red signal is observed. Unbalanced MYC-R are frequently associated with increased MYC expression.

There is a large variability in the interpretation of unbalanced MYC BAP results among the scientists, which can impact diagnostic classification and therapeutic management of the patients.

== Animal models ==
In Drosophila Myc is encoded by the diminutive locus, (which was known to geneticists prior to 1935). Classical diminutive alleles resulted in a viable animal with small body size. Drosophila has subsequently been used to implicate Myc in cell competition, endoreplication, and cell growth.

During the discovery of Myc gene, it was realized that chromosomes that reciprocally translocate to chromosome 8 contained immunoglobulin genes at the break-point. To study the mechanism of tumorigenesis in Burkitt lymphoma by mimicking expression pattern of Myc in these cancer cells, transgenic mouse models were developed. Myc gene placed under the control of IgM heavy chain enhancer in transgenic mice gives rise to mainly lymphomas. Later on, in order to study effects of Myc in other types of cancer, transgenic mice that overexpress Myc in different tissues (liver, breast) were also made. In all these mouse models overexpression of Myc causes tumorigenesis, illustrating the potency of Myc oncogene. In a study with mice, reduced expression of Myc was shown to induce longevity, with significantly extended median and maximum lifespans in both sexes and a reduced mortality rate across all ages, better health, cancer progression was slower, better metabolism and they had smaller bodies. Also, Less TOR, AKT, S6K and other changes in energy and metabolic pathways (such as AMPK, more oxygen consumption, more body movements, etc.). The study by John M. Sedivy and others used Cre-Loxp -recombinase to knockout one copy of Myc and this resulted in a "Haplo-insufficient" genotype noted as Myc±. The phenotypes seen oppose the effects of normal aging and are shared with many other long-lived mouse models such as CR (calorie restriction) ames dwarf, rapamycin, metformin and resveratrol. One study found that Myc and p53 genes were key to the survival of chronic myeloid leukaemia (CML) cells. Targeting Myc and p53 proteins with drugs gave positive results on mice with CML.

== Discovery ==
The Myc family was first established after discovery of homology between an oncogene carried by the Avian virus, Myelocytomatosis (v-myc; P10395) and a human gene over-expressed in various cancers, cellular Myc (c-Myc). Later, discovery of further homologous genes in humans led to the addition of n-Myc and l-Myc to the family of genes. The most frequently discussed example of c-Myc as a proto-oncogene is its implication in Burkitt's lymphoma. In Burkitt's lymphoma, cancer cells show chromosomal translocations, most commonly between chromosome 8 and chromosome 14 [t(8;14)]. This causes c-Myc to be placed downstream of the highly active immunoglobulin (Ig) promoter region, leading to overexpression of Myc.

== See also ==
- Myc-tag
- C-myc mRNA
