= MXD1 =

Protein-coding gene in the species Homo sapiens

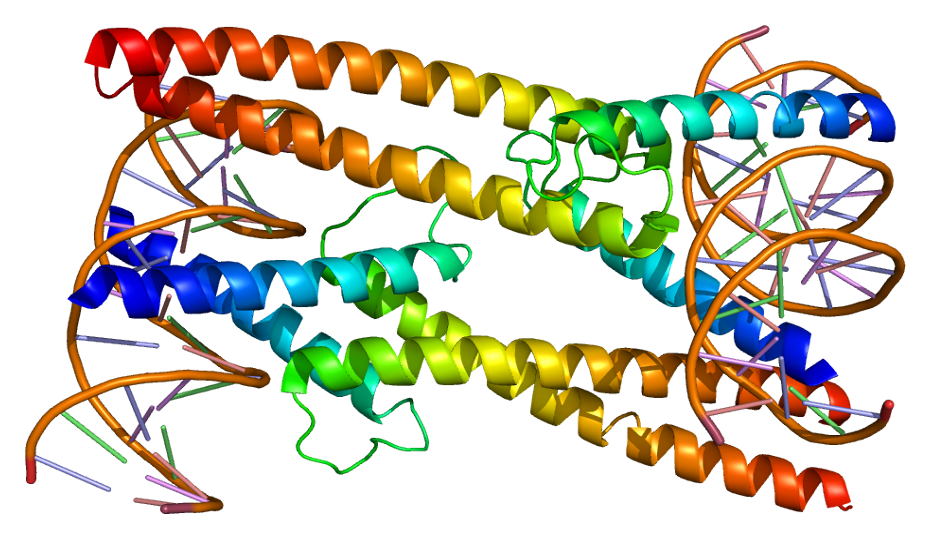

Identifiers
- Aliases: MXD1, BHLHC58, MAD, MAD1, MAX dimerization protein 1
- External IDs: OMIM: 600021; MGI: 96908; GeneCards: MXD1
Available structures
PDB	Ortholog search: PDBe RCSB
PDB	List of PDB id codes 1E91, 1G1E, 1NLW, 1PD7, 1S5Q

Gene location (Human)
Chr.	Chromosome 2 (human)
Band	2p13.3	Start	69,897,688 bp
Band	2p13.3	End	69,942,945 bp

Gene location (Mouse)
Chr.	Chromosome 6 (mouse)
Band	6 D1|6 37.75 cM	Start	86,624,024 bp
Band	6 D1|6 37.75 cM	End	86,646,143 bp
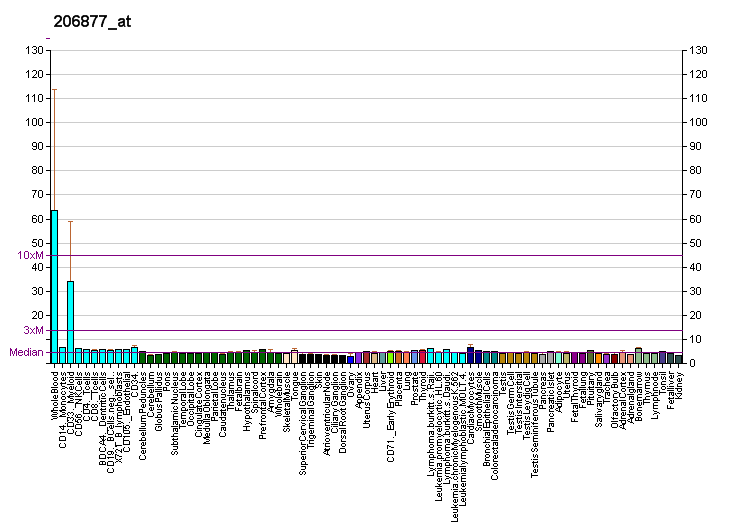
RNA expression pattern
Bgee	Human / Mouse (ortholog); Top expressed in: buccal mucosa cell; mucosa of pharynx; oocyte; secondary oocyte; amniotic fluid; blood; oral cavity; jejunal mucosa; mucosa of colon; mucosa of sigmoid colon / Top expressed in: granulocyte; left colon; blood; retinal pigment epithelium; duodenum; ciliary body; secondary oocyte; epithelium of stomach; jejunum; conjunctival fornix; More reference expression data
BioGPS	More reference expression data
Gene ontology
Molecular function	DNA-binding transcription factor activity; RNA polymerase II cis-regulatory region sequence-specific DNA binding; DNA binding; DNA-binding transcription repressor activity, RNA polymerase II-specific; protein binding; transcription coregulator activity; protein dimerization activity; transcription corepressor activity; DNA-binding transcription factor activity, RNA polymerase II-specific
Cellular component	nucleus; nucleoplasm; mitochondrion; cytosol
Biological process	multicellular organism development; cell population proliferation; regulation of transcription, DNA-templated; negative regulation of transcription by RNA polymerase II; transcription, DNA-templated
Sources:Amigo / QuickGO
Orthologs
Databases	NCBI: entry; OMA: entry
Species	Human	Mouse
Entrez	4084	17119
Ensembl	ENSG00000059728	ENSMUSG00000001156
UniProt	Q05195	P50538
RefSeq (mRNA)	NM_002357; NM_001202513; NM_001202514	NM_010751
RefSeq (protein)	NP_001189442; NP_001189443; NP_002348	n/a
Location (UCSC)	Chr 2: 69.9 – 69.94 Mb	Chr 6: 86.62 – 86.65 Mb
PubMed search
- Wikidata
View/Edit Human	View/Edit Mouse

MAD protein is a protein that in humans is encoded by the MXD1 gene.

MAD-MAX dimerization protein belongs to a subfamily of MAX-interacting proteins. This protein competes with MYC for binding to MAX to form a sequence-specific DNA-binding complex, acts as a transcriptional repressor (while MYC appears to function as an activator) and is a candidate tumor suppressor.

== Interactions ==
MXD1 has been shown to interact with Histone deacetylase 2, SMC3, MLX, SIN3A and MAX.
