= MAX (gene) =

Protein-coding gene in humans

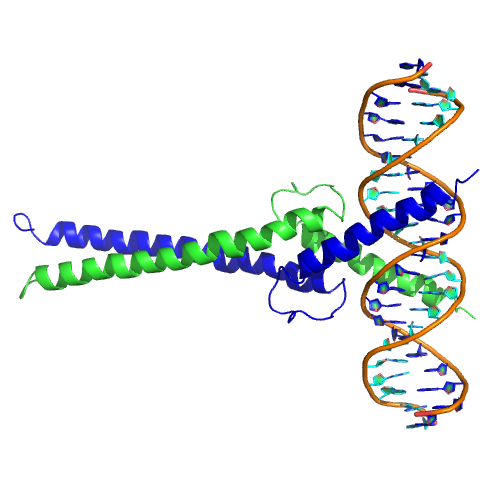

Identifiers
- Aliases: MAX, bHLHd4, max, MYC associated factor X
- External IDs: OMIM: 154950; MGI: 96921; GeneCards: MAX
Available structures
PDB	Ortholog search: PDBe RCSB
PDB	List of PDB id codes 1AN2, 1HLO, 1NKP, 1NLW, 1R05

Gene location (Human)
Chr.	Chromosome 14 (human)
Band	14q23.3	Start	65,006,174 bp
Band	14q23.3	End	65,102,695 bp

Gene location (Mouse)
Chr.	Chromosome 12 (mouse)
Band	12 C3|12 33.78 cM	Start	76,984,043 bp
Band	12 C3|12 33.78 cM	End	77,008,975 bp
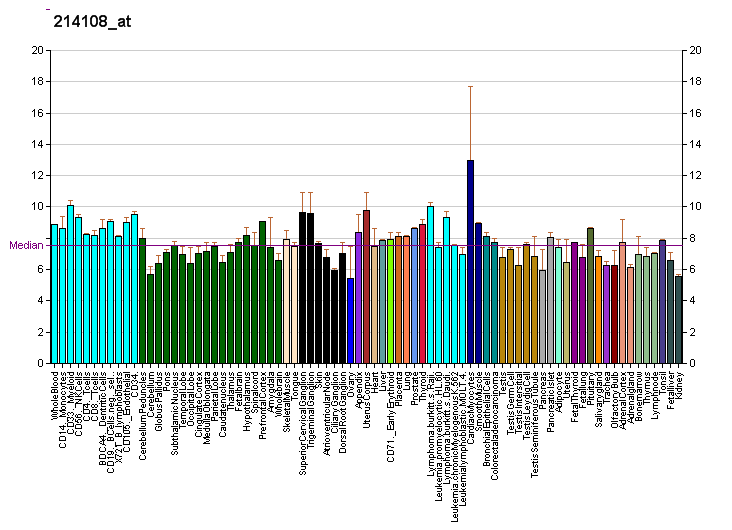

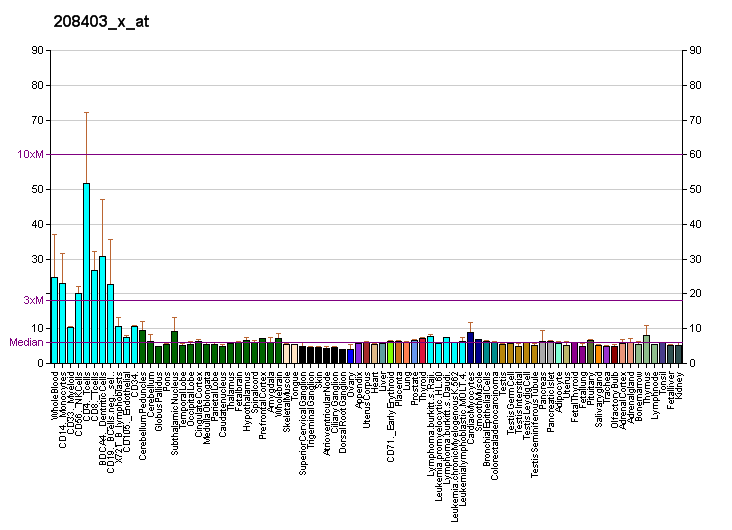

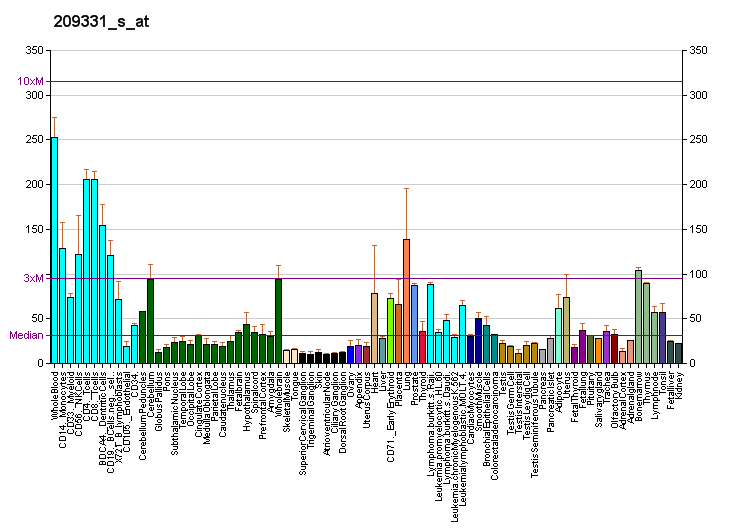
RNA expression pattern
Bgee	Human / Mouse (ortholog); Top expressed in: monocyte; tendon of biceps brachii; oocyte; secondary oocyte; epithelium of nasopharynx; blood; olfactory bulb; dorsal motor nucleus of vagus nerve; Achilles tendon; granulocyte / Top expressed in: granulocyte; tail of embryo; genital tubercle; zygote; neural layer of retina; lip; esophagus; yolk sac; muscle of thigh; secondary oocyte; More reference expression data
BioGPS	More reference expression data
Gene ontology
Molecular function	sequence-specific DNA binding; protein dimerization activity; DNA-binding transcription factor activity; transcription coactivator activity; transcription coregulator activity; RNA polymerase II general transcription initiation factor activity; RNA polymerase II cis-regulatory region sequence-specific DNA binding; protein binding; DNA binding; protein homodimerization activity; E-box binding; RNA polymerase II transcription regulatory region sequence-specific DNA binding; DNA-binding transcription repressor activity, RNA polymerase II-specific; DNA-binding transcription factor activity, RNA polymerase II-specific; protein-containing complex binding; protein heterodimerization activity
Cellular component	PML body; cell projection; dendrite; nucleus; nucleoplasm; cytoplasm; protein-DNA complex; MLL1 complex; RNA polymerase II transcription regulator complex
Biological process	neuron apoptotic process; regulation of transcription, DNA-templated; regulation of transcription by RNA polymerase II; cellular response to starvation; transcription by RNA polymerase II; negative regulation of gene expression; transcription, DNA-templated; response to insulin; cellular response to peptide hormone stimulus; retina development in camera-type eye; response to axon injury; response to organonitrogen compound; negative regulation of transcription by RNA polymerase II; negative regulation of G0 to G1 transition; G1/S transition of mitotic cell cycle; protein-containing complex assembly; positive regulation of nucleic acid-templated transcription; positive regulation of transcription by RNA polymerase II
Sources:Amigo / QuickGO
Orthologs
Databases	NCBI: entry; OMA: entry
Species	Human	Mouse
Entrez	4149	17187
Ensembl	ENSG00000125952	ENSMUSG00000059436
UniProt	P61244; Q8TAX8	P28574
RefSeq (mRNA)	NM_001271068; NM_001271069; NM_002382; NM_145112; NM_145113 NM_145114; NM_145116; NM_197957; NM_001320415	NM_001146176; NM_008558; NM_001361663; NM_001361664
RefSeq (protein)	NP_001257997; NP_001257998; NP_001307344; NP_002373; NP_660087 NP_660088; NP_660089; NP_932061; NP_002373.3; NP_660087.1; NP_660088.1; NP_001307344.1	NP_001139648; NP_001348592; NP_001348593; NP_032584
Location (UCSC)	Chr 14: 65.01 – 65.1 Mb	Chr 12: 76.98 – 77.01 Mb
PubMed search
- Wikidata
View/Edit Human	View/Edit Mouse

MAX (also known as myc-associated factor X) is a gene that in humans encodes the MAX transcription factor.

== Function ==
The protein product of MAX contains the basic helix-loop-helix and leucine zipper motifs. It is therefore included in the bHLHZ family of transcription factors. It is able to form homodimers with other MAX proteins and heterodimers with other transcription factors, including Mad, Mxl1 and Myc. The homodimers and heterodimers compete for a common DNA target site (the E-box) in a gene promoter zone. Rearrangement of dimers (e.g., Mad:Max, Max:Myc) provides a system of transcriptional regulation with greater diversity of gene targets. Max must dimerise in order to be biologically active.

Transcriptionally active hetero- and homodimers involving Max can promote cell proliferation as well as apoptosis.

== Interactions ==
The protein product of Max has been shown to interact with:

- Myc,
- MNT,
- MSH2,
- MXD1,
- MXI1,
- MYCL1,
- N-Myc,
- SPAG9,
- TEAD1, and
- Transformation/transcription domain-associated protein.

== Clinical relevance ==
This gene has been shown mutated in cases of hereditary pheochromocytoma. More recently the Max gene becomes mutated and becomes inactivated in small cell lung cancer (SCLC). This is mutually exclusive with alterations at Myc and BRG1, the latter coding for an ATPase of the SWI/SNF complex. It was demonstrated that the BRG1 product regulates the expression of Max through direct recruitment to the Max promoter region, and that depletion of BRG1 strongly hinders cell growth, specifically in Max-deficient cells, suggesting that the two together cause synthetic lethality. Furthermore, Max required BRG1 to activate neuroendocrine transcriptional programs and to up-regulate Myc targets, such as glycolytic-related genes.
