= Master regulator gene =

Gene at the top of a regulation hierarchy

In genetics, a master regulator gene is a regulator gene at the top of a gene regulation hierarchy, particularly in regulatory pathways related to cell fate and differentiation.

== Examples ==
Most genes considered master regulators code for transcription factor proteins, which in turn alter the expression of downstream genes in the pathway. Canonical examples of master regulators include Oct-4 (also called POU5F1), SOX2, and NANOG, all transcription factors involved in maintaining pluripotency in stem cells. Master regulators involved in development and morphogenesis can also appear as oncogenes relevant to tumorigenesis and metastasis, as with the Twist transcription factor.

Other genes reported as master regulators code for SR proteins, which function as splicing factors, and some noncoding RNAs.

== Criticism ==
The master regulator concept has been criticized for being a "simplified paradigm" that fails to account for the multifactorial influences on some cell fates.
