= Paul J. Tesar =

American developmental biologist

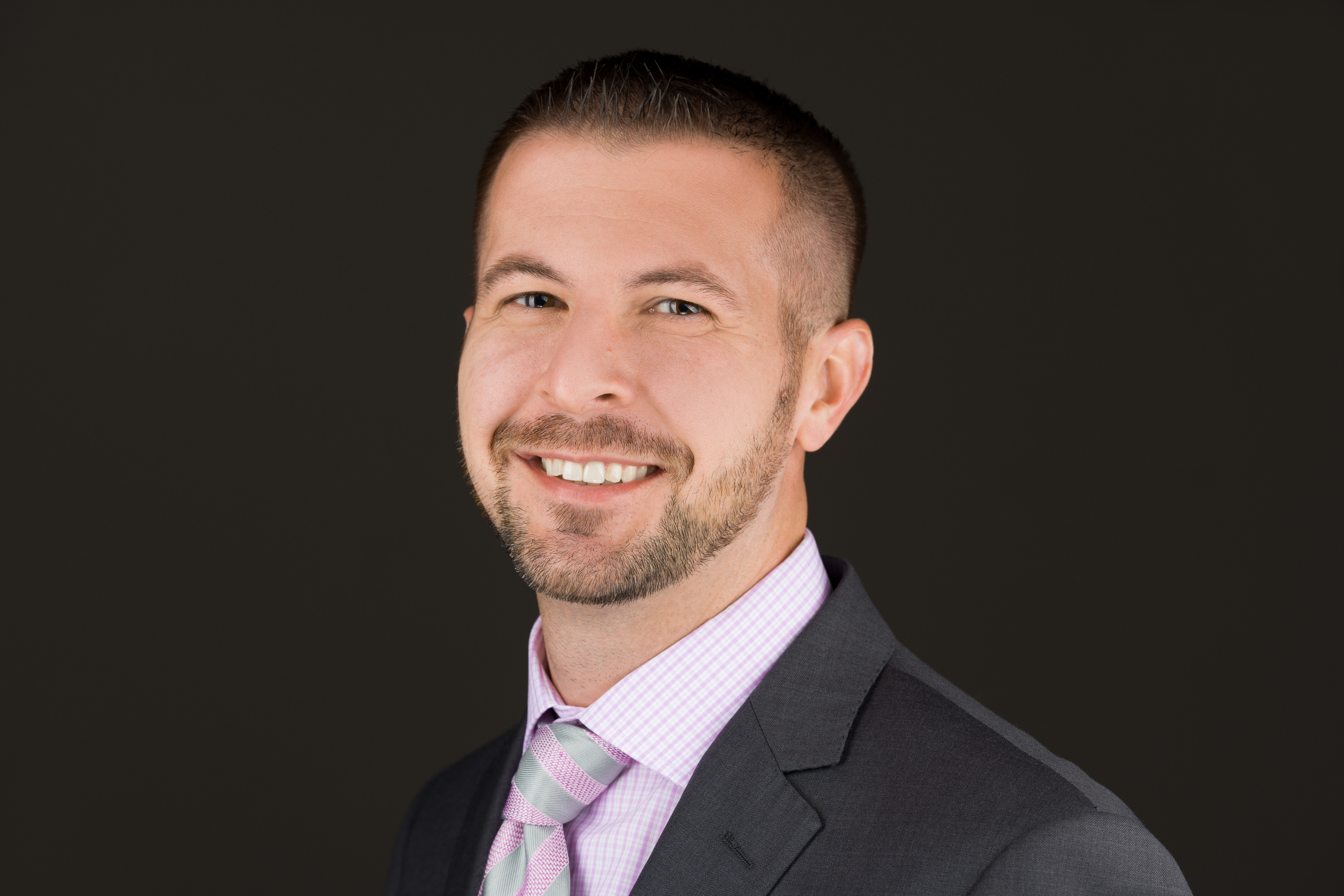
- Born: Cleveland, Ohio, US
- Education: BSc, Case Western Reserve University, 2003; PhD, Oxford, 2007
- Known for: discovery of epiblast stem cells; myelin regeneration; treatments for Pelizaeus-Merzbacher disease
- Awards: Harold M. Weintraub Award, 2008; Beddington Medal, 2008; Robertson Stem Cell Prize, 2017
- Scientific career
- Fields: stem cell biology; developmental biology; glial biology
- Institutions: Case Western Reserve School of Medicine
- Doctoral advisors: Richard Gardner; Ronald McKay
- Website: tesarlab.com

Paul J. Tesar is an American developmental biologist. He is the Dr. Donald and Ruth Weber Goodman Professor of Innovative Therapeutics at Case Western Reserve University School of Medicine. His research is focused on regenerative medicine.

== Early life and education ==
Tesar was born in Cleveland, Ohio. He graduated with a BSc in biology from Case Western Reserve University in 2003. As part of the National Institutes of Health Oxford-Cambridge Scholar Program, he earned a PhD in 2007.

== Career ==
While a graduate student, Tesar published a paper describing epiblast-derived stem cells, a new type of pluripotent stem cell, research for which he received both the Beddington Medal of the British Society for Developmental Biology and the Harold M. Weintraub Award of the Fred Hutchinson Cancer Research Center.

In 2010 he returned to Case Western Reserve University School of Medicine to teach. In 2014 he was appointed to the Dr. Donald and Ruth Weber Goodman chair in innovative therapeutics.

== Research ==
Tesar developed methods to generate and grow oligodendrocytes and oligodendrocyte progenitor cells (OPCs) from pluripotent stem cells and skin cells. He also made human brain organoids containing human myelin, called oligocortical spheroids. Tesar identified drugs that stimulate myelin regeneration and reverse paralysis in mice with multiple sclerosis. Tesar also identified CRISPR and antisense oligonucleotide therapeutics that restored myelination and extended the lifespan of mice with Pelizaeus–Merzbacher disease.

== Awards ==
- Beddington Medal from the British Society for Developmental Biology (2008)
- Harold M. Weintraub Award (2008)
- Outstanding Young Investigator Award, International Society for Stem Cell Research (2015)
- Senior Member of the National Academy of Inventors,
- American Association for the Advancement of Science Fellow (2025)
