= Rex1 =

Protein marker in embryonic stem cells

ZFP42

Identifiers
- Aliases: ZFP42, REX1, ZNF754, REX-1, zfp-42, Rex1, ZFP42 zinc finger protein
- External IDs: OMIM: 614572; MGI: 99187; GeneCards: ZFP42

Gene location (Human)
Chr.	Chromosome 4 (human)
Band	4q35.2	Start	187,995,771 bp
Band	4q35.2	End	188,005,046 bp

Gene location (Mouse)
Chr.	Chromosome 8 (mouse)
Band	8 A4|8 23.89 cM	Start	43,748,100 bp
Band	8 A4|8 23.89 cM	End	43,760,017 bp
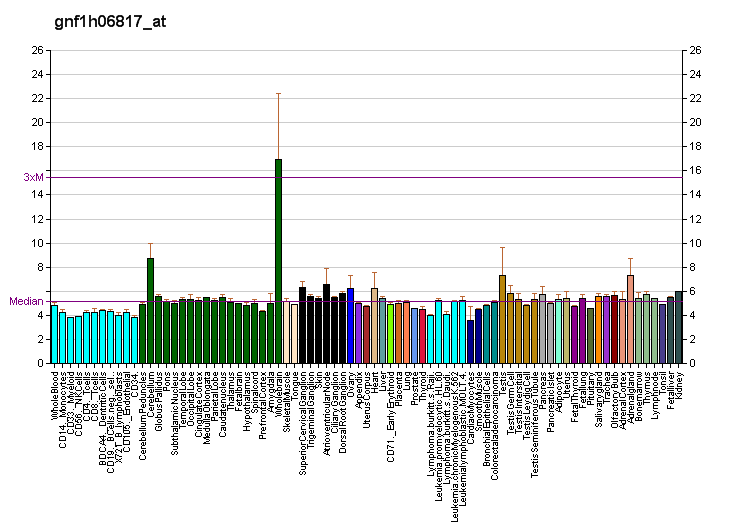
RNA expression pattern
Bgee	Human / Mouse (ortholog); Top expressed in: buccal mucosa cell; gonad; amniotic fluid; sperm; testicle; placenta; right testis; left testis; skin of thigh; ventricular zone / Top expressed in: blastocyst; morula; placenta; spermatocyte; ureter; embryo; embryo; male human body; male reproductive system; testicle; More reference expression data
BioGPS	More reference expression data
Gene ontology
Molecular function	DNA-binding transcription factor activity; DNA binding; metal ion binding; nucleic acid binding; DNA-binding transcription factor activity, RNA polymerase II-specific; RNA polymerase II cis-regulatory region sequence-specific DNA binding; DNA-binding transcription repressor activity, RNA polymerase II-specific; sequence-specific DNA binding
Cellular component	cytoplasm; nucleus; transcription regulator complex; PcG protein complex
Biological process	male gonad development; regulation of transcription, DNA-templated; transcription, DNA-templated; female gonad development; meiosis; regulation of transcription by RNA polymerase II; negative regulation of transcription by RNA polymerase II
Sources:Amigo / QuickGO
Orthologs
Databases	NCBI: entry; OMA: entry
Species	Human	Mouse
Entrez	132625	22702
Ensembl	ENSG00000179059	ENSMUSG00000051176
UniProt	Q96MM3	P22227
RefSeq (mRNA)	NM_001304358; NM_174900	NM_009556
RefSeq (protein)	NP_001291287; NP_777560	NP_033582
Location (UCSC)	Chr 4: 188 – 188.01 Mb	Chr 8: 43.75 – 43.76 Mb
PubMed search
- Wikidata
View/Edit Human	View/Edit Mouse

Rex1 (Zfp-42) is a protein that in humans is encoded by the gene ZFP42. It is a known marker of pluripotency, and is usually found in undifferentiated embryonic stem cells. In addition to being a marker for pluripotency, its regulation is also critical in maintaining a pluripotent state. As the cells begin to differentiate, Rex1 is severely and abruptly downregulated.

== Discovery ==
Rex1 was discovered by Hosler, BA et al. in 1989 when studying F9 murine teratocarcinoma stem cells. They found that these teratocarcinoma stem cells expressed high levels of Rex1, and that they resembled pluripotent stem cells of the inner cell mass (ICM). Hosler, BA et al. found that these teratocarcinoma stem cells, when in the presence of retinoic acid (RA), differentiated into nontumorigenic cells resembling extraembryonic endoderm of early mouse embryos. They were able to isolate the nucleotide sequence for Rex1 using differential hybridization of an F9 cell. They named it Rex1 for reduced expression 1 because there was a steady decline of its mRNA levels within 12 hours of the addition of RA.

== Structure ==
Rex1 is a protein that in humans is encoded by the ZFP42 gene. The Rex1 protein is 310 amino acids long, and has four closely spaced zinc fingers at 188–212, 217–239, 245–269, and 275–299.

== p38 MAPK & Mesenchymal Stem Cells ==
Rex1 has been found to be critically important in maintaining proliferative state in mesenchymal stem cells (MSC), while simultaneously preventing differentiation. Both umbilical cord blood MSC and adipose MSC express high levels of Rex1, while bone marrow MSC expressed low levels of Rex1. Proliferation rates are highly correlated with Rex1 expression levels, meaning high Rex1 expression is correlated with high levels of proliferation. The MSCs with weak Rex1 expression, have activated p38 MAPK and high expression levels of MKK3. Thus, Rex1 expression is inversely correlated with p38 MAPK activation, and positively correlated with high proliferation rates. Rex1 was found to inhibit MKK3 expression, which activates p38 MAPK. Activated p38 MAPK, in turn, inhibits proliferation. Rex1 was also found to inhibit NOTCH and STAT3, two transcription factors which lead to differentiation. Therefore, Rex1 expression allows for high levels of proliferation, and prevents differentiation through a network of various transcription factors and protein kinases.

== Embryo Development ==
=== Tissue Derivation ===
During embryogenesis, the inner cell mass (ICM) is separated from the trophoblast. The stem cells derived from the ICM and trophectoderm have been found to express high levels of Oct3/4 and Rex1. As the ICM matures and begins to form the epiblast, and primitive ectoderm, the cells in the ICM have been found to be a heterogenous population, with varying levels of Rex1 expression. Rex1^{−}/Oct3/4^{−} triggers trophectoderm differentiation, while Rex1^{+}/Oct3/4^{+} cells predominantly differentiate into primitive endoderm and mesoderm. Also, Rex1^{−}/Oct3/4^{+} cells differentiate into cells of primitive ectoderm, the somatic cell lineage.

=== Gene Control ===
Studies have shown that PEG3 and Nespas are downstream targets of Rex1. Rex1 can control the expression of Peg3 via epigenetic changes. YY1 has been shown to be involved in setting up DNA methylation on the maternal allele of PEG3 during oogenesis. Rex1 was found to protect the paternal allele from being methylated, and keep the PEG3 gene unmethylated during early embryogenesis. Rex1 exhibits gene control in developing embryos via its epigenetic control on genes such as PEG3, which has been identified as playing a key role in fetal growth rates

== Expression in Adult Tissues ==
The only adult tissue Rex1 has been identified in are the testicles. Using in situ hybridization it was determined that the spermatocytes in the more inner layers of the testicles are expressing Rex1. Thus, the male germ cells undergoing meiosis are the specific cells in the testicles that express Rex1. It has not been observed, however, that Rex1 is expressed in the female germ cells.

== Rex1 Interactions with Other Transcription Factors ==
Rex1 participates in a network of transcription factors that all work to regulate each other via varying expression levels.

=== Nanog ===
The Nanog protein has been found to be a transcriptional activator for the Rex-1 promoter, playing a key role in sustaining Rex1 expression. Knockdown of Nanog in embryonic stem cells results in a reduction of Rex-1 expression, while forced expression of Nanog stimulates Rex-1 expression. Nanog regulates the transcription of Rex1 through 2 strong transactivation domains on the C-terminus which are required to activate the Rex1 promoter.

=== NOTCH ===
Rex1 has been found to inhibit the expression of NOTCH, thus preventing differentiation.

=== STAT3 ===
Rex1 has been found to inhibit the expression of STAT3, thus preventing differentiation.

=== Sox2 ===
Cooperative regulation of Rex1 is seen with Sox2 and Nanog.

=== Oct3/4 ===
Oct3/4 can both repress and activate the Rex1 promoter. In cells that already express high level of Oct3/4, exogenously transfected Oct3/4 will lead to the repression of Rex1. However, in cells that are not actively expressing Oct3/4, an exogenous transfection of Oct3/4 will lead to the activation of Rex1. This implies a dual regulatory ability of Oct3/4 on Rex1. At low levels of the Oct3/4 protein, the Rex1 promoter is activated, while at high levels of the Oct3/4 protein, the Rex1 promoter is repressed.
