= CACYBP =

Protein-coding gene in humans

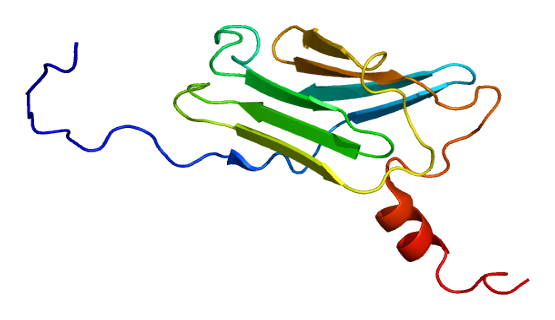

Identifiers
- Aliases: CACYBP, GIG5, S100A6BP, SIP, PNAS-107, calcyclin binding protein
- External IDs: OMIM: 606186; MGI: 1270839; GeneCards: CACYBP
Available structures
PDB	Ortholog search: PDBe RCSB
PDB	List of PDB id codes 1X5M, 2A25, 2A26

Gene location (Human)
Chr.	Chromosome 1 (human)
Band	1q25.1	Start	174,999,163 bp
Band	1q25.1	End	175,012,027 bp

Gene location (Mouse)
Chr.	Chromosome 1 (mouse)
Band	1|1 H2.1	Start	160,029,937 bp
Band	1|1 H2.1	End	160,040,445 bp
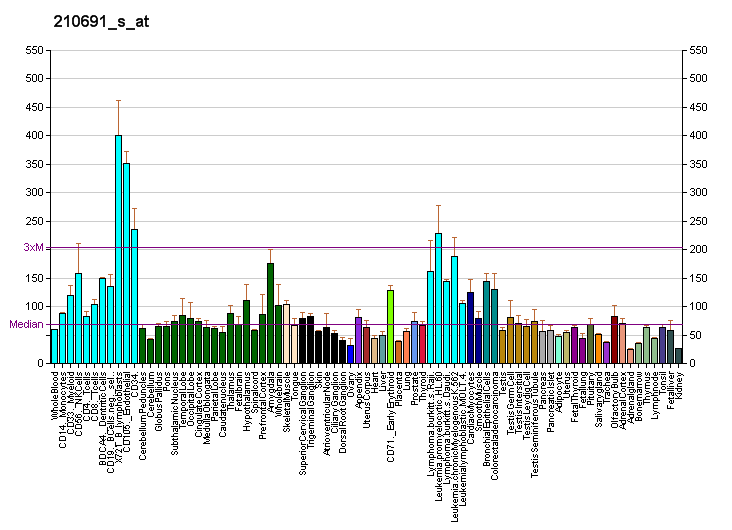

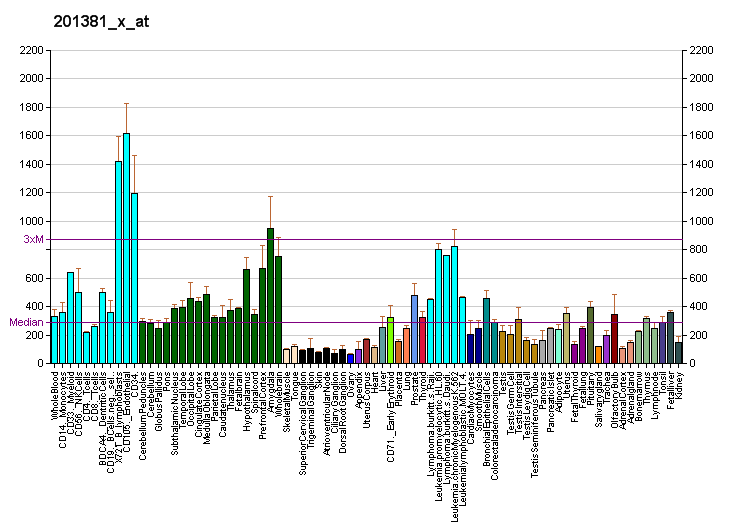

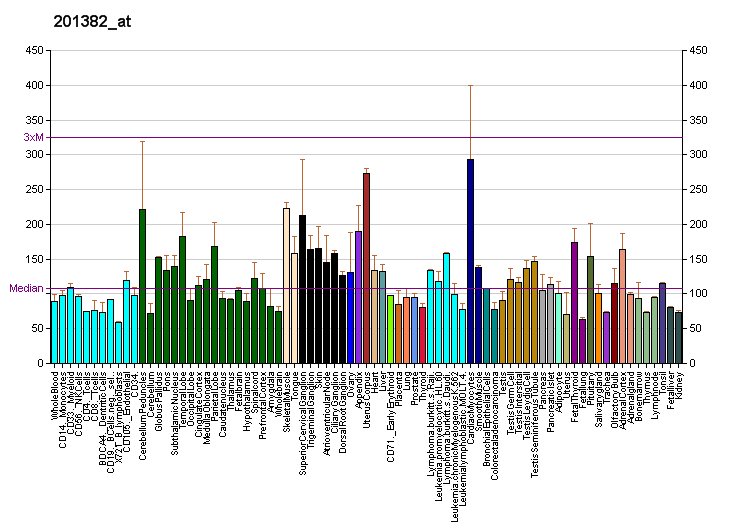
RNA expression pattern
Bgee	Human / Mouse (ortholog); Top expressed in: endothelial cell; pons; postcentral gyrus; entorhinal cortex; superior frontal gyrus; middle temporal gyrus; Brodmann area 46; Brodmann area 23; orbitofrontal cortex; ventricular zone / Top expressed in: primitive streak; abdominal wall; tail of embryo; mandibular prominence; genital tubercle; maxillary prominence; somite; yolk sac; arcuate nucleus; dorsomedial hypothalamic nucleus; More reference expression data
BioGPS	More reference expression data
Gene ontology
Molecular function	protein binding; protein homodimerization activity; protein domain specific binding; ubiquitin protein ligase binding; tubulin binding; S100 protein binding
Cellular component	nuclear envelope lumen; extracellular exosome; beta-catenin destruction complex; nucleus; nucleoplasm; neuron projection; cell body; cytoplasm; cytosol; SCF ubiquitin ligase complex
Biological process	cardiac muscle cell differentiation; positive regulation of DNA replication; ageing; negative regulation of cell death; cellular response to calcium ion; development of the heart; response to growth hormone; cellular response to leukemia inhibitory factor
Sources:Amigo / QuickGO
Orthologs
Databases	NCBI: entry; OMA: entry
Species	Human	Mouse
Entrez	27101	12301
Ensembl	ENSG00000116161	ENSMUSG00000014226
UniProt	Q9HB71	Q9CXW3
RefSeq (mRNA)	NM_014412; NM_001007214	NM_009786
RefSeq (protein)	NP_001007215; NP_055227	NP_033916
Location (UCSC)	Chr 1: 175 – 175.01 Mb	Chr 1: 160.03 – 160.04 Mb
PubMed search
- Wikidata
View/Edit Human	View/Edit Mouse

Calcyclin-binding protein is a protein that in humans is encoded by the CACYBP gene.

The protein encoded by this gene is a calcyclin binding protein. It may be involved in calcium-dependent ubiquitination and subsequent proteosomal degradation of target proteins. It probably serves as a molecular bridge in ubiquitin E3 complexes and participates in the ubiquitin-mediated degradation of beta-catenin. Two alternatively spliced transcript variants encoding different isoforms have been found for this gene.

== Protein interactions ==
CACYBP has been shown to interact with SKP1A and SIAH1.

The CacyBP/SIP complex instead, is known to be a part of stress respons, since it interacts with chaperone HSP90.
