= KIF22 =

Protein-coding gene in the species Homo sapiens

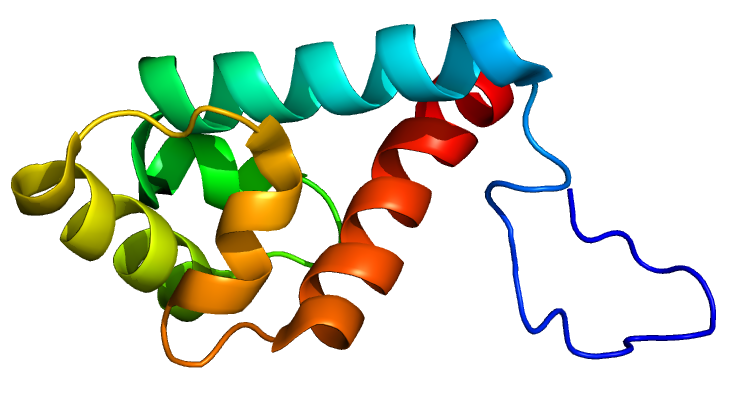

Identifiers
- Aliases: KIF22, A-328A3.2, KID, KNSL4, OBP, OBP-1, OBP-2, SEMDJL2, kinesin family member 22
- External IDs: OMIM: 603213; MGI: 109233; GeneCards: KIF22
Available structures
PDB	Ortholog search: PDBe RCSB
PDB	List of PDB id codes 2EDU, 3BFN

Gene location (Human)
Chr.	Chromosome 16 (human)
Band	16p11.2	Start	29,790,727 bp
Band	16p11.2	End	29,805,385 bp

Gene location (Mouse)
Chr.	Chromosome 7 (mouse)
Band	7 F3|7 69.29 cM	Start	126,626,901 bp
Band	7 F3|7 69.29 cM	End	126,641,643 bp
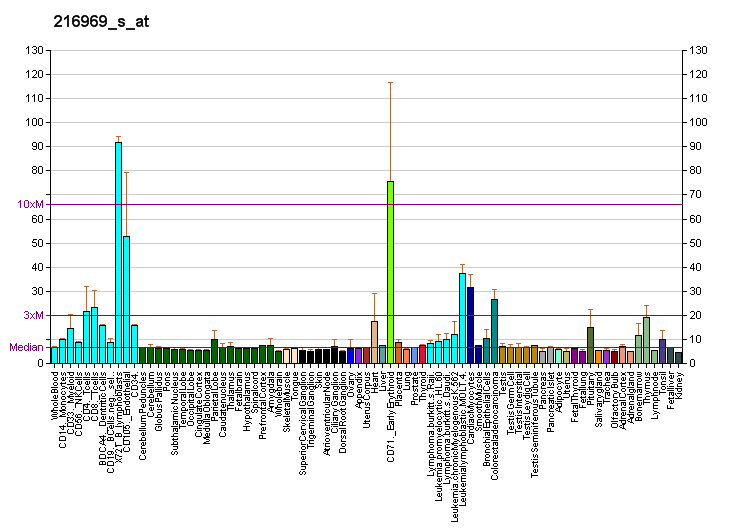

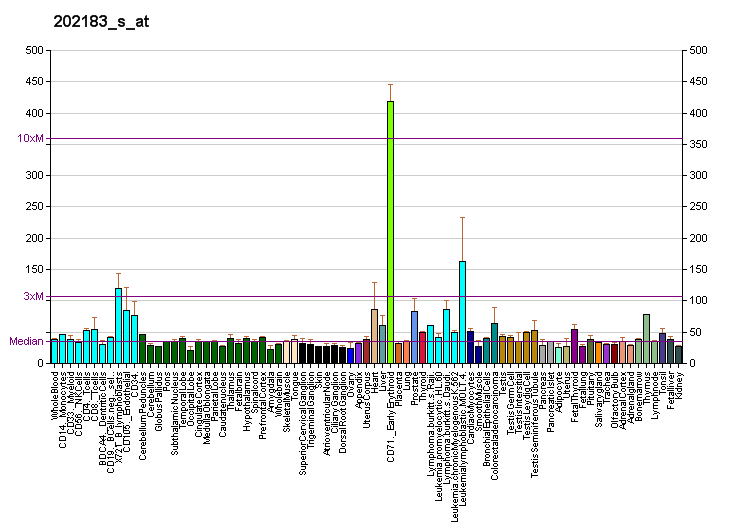
RNA expression pattern
Bgee	Human / Mouse (ortholog); Top expressed in: ventricular zone; ganglionic eminence; right lobe of thyroid gland; left lobe of thyroid gland; apex of heart; mucosa of transverse colon; gonad; granulocyte; rectum; right testis / Top expressed in: human fetus; Ileal epithelium; fetal liver hematopoietic progenitor cell; Paneth cell; medial ganglionic eminence; tibiofemoral joint; primary oocyte; primitive streak; ureter; internal carotid artery; More reference expression data
BioGPS	More reference expression data
Gene ontology
Molecular function	DNA binding; nucleotide binding; microtubule binding; ATPase activity; protein binding; ATP binding; microtubule motor activity
Cellular component	kinesin complex; spindle; chromatin; mitotic spindle; microtubule; cytoskeleton; kinetochore; nucleus; cytoplasm; cytosol; nuclear speck
Biological process	metaphase plate congression; antigen processing and presentation of exogenous peptide antigen via MHC class II; sister chromatid cohesion; microtubule-based movement; mitotic metaphase plate congression; DNA repair; retrograde vesicle-mediated transport, Golgi to endoplasmic reticulum; mitotic cell cycle
Sources:Amigo / QuickGO
Orthologs
Databases	NCBI: entry; OMA: entry
Species	Human	Mouse
Entrez	3835	110033
Ensembl	ENSG00000079616	ENSMUSG00000030677
UniProt	Q14807	Q3V300
RefSeq (mRNA)	NM_001256269; NM_001256270; NM_007317	NM_145588
RefSeq (protein)	NP_001243198; NP_001243199; NP_015556	NP_663563; NP_001390552
Location (UCSC)	Chr 16: 29.79 – 29.81 Mb	Chr 7: 126.63 – 126.64 Mb
PubMed search
- Wikidata
View/Edit Human	View/Edit Mouse

Kinesin-like protein KIF22 is a protein that in humans is encoded by the KIF22 gene.

The protein encoded by this gene is a member of kinesin-like protein family. This family of proteins are microtubule-dependent molecular motors that transport organelles within cells and move chromosomes during cell division. The C-terminal half of this protein has been shown to bind DNA. Studies with the Xenopus homolog suggests an essential role in metaphase chromosome alignment and maintenance.

== Interactions ==
KIF22 has been shown to interact with SIAH1.

== Clinical relevance ==
Mutations in this gene have been shown to cause developmental disorders such as Spondyloepimetaphyseal dysplasia with joint laxity.
