= Epiblast-derived stem cell =

Type of stem cell

After the blastocyst stage, once an embryo implanted in endometrium (in case of rodent), the inner cell mass (ICM) of a fertilized embryo segregates into two layers: hypoblast and epiblast. The epiblast cells are the functional progenitors of soma and germ cells which later differentiate into three layers: definitive endoderm, mesoderm and ectoderm. Stem cells derived from epiblast are pluripotent. These cells are called epiblast-derived stem cells (EpiSCs) and have several different cellular and molecular characteristics with Embryonic Stem Cells (ESCs). Pluripotency in EpiSCs is essentially different from that of embryonic stem cells. The pluripotency of EpiSCs is primed pluripotency: primed to differentiate into specific cell lineages. Naïve pluripotent stem cells (e.g. ESC) and primed pluripotent stem cells (e.g. EpiSC) not only sustain the ability to self-renew but also maintain the capacity to differentiate. Since the cell status is primed to differentiate in EpiSCs, however, one copy of the X chromosome in XX cells (female cells) in EpiSCs is silenced (XaXi). EpiSCs is unable to colonize and is not available to be used to produce chimeras. Conversely, XX cells in ESCs are both active and can produce chimera when inserted into a blastocyst. Both ESC and EpiSC induce teratoma when injected in the test animals (scid mice) which proves pluripotency. EpiSC display several distinctive characteristics distinct from ESCs (table 1). The cellular status of human ESCs (hESCs) is similar to primed state mouse stem cells rather than naïve state.

== Comparisons ==
Table 1. Comparison of naïve and primed pluripotent states

| Property | Naive State | Primed State |
|---|---|---|
| Embryonic tissue | Early epiblast | Egg cylinder or embryonic disc |
| Culture stem cell | Mouse ESCs | Mouse EpiSCs; primate "ESCs" |
| Blastocyst chimaeras | Yes | No |
| Teratomas | Yes | Yes |
| Pluripotency factors | Oct4, Nanog, Sox2 (high levels), Klf2, Klf4 | Oct4, Nanog, Sox2 (low levels) |
| Sox2/Oct4 dimerization | High | Low |
| Naive markers | Active Pou5f1 distal enhancer | Active Pou5f1 proximal enhancer |
| Specification markers | Absent | Fgf5, T |
| Response to Lif/Stat3 | Self-renewal | None |
| Response to Fgf/Erk | Differentiation | Self-renewal |
| Clonogenicity | High | Low |
| XX status | Both active | One X inactive |

Differentiating naïve pluripotent Stem cells into primed pluripotent stem cells (e.g. adding activin and fibroblast growth factor (FGF) in the culture medium) can be accomplished but reprogramming of primed cells into naïve cells is more difficult. Several approaches to reprogramming EpiSCs to achieve naïve pluripotency have been applied. One of those methods is overexpressing in the primed pluripotent stem cell a reprogramming factor Klf4, or Sox2 and Klf4 (SK cocktail). Klf4 alone can reset mouse primed cells, but SK is needed for human naive reset.

The reversion back to the naive state has also been achieved by suppressing the activity of the histone methyltransferase MLL1, also known as KMT2A. The inhibition of MLL1 via the small-molecule inhibitor MM-401 in EpiSCs showed increase in alkaline phosphatase staining as well as upregulation of "naive" markers such as Rex1 and downregulation of "primed" markers such as FGF5. Moreover, beyond the potency-state comparison, MLL1 inhibition was also shown to reactivate the silenced X-chromosome which is typically deactivated in post-implantation epiblast stem cells, suggesting an epigenetic reversion back to a more ground-level, naive state. What's more, some EpiSCs affected by the MLL1 inhibition-induced reversion were able to contribute to germline-competent chimeras, which had been considered as one of the most major differences between ESCs and EpiSCs.

== EpiLC ==
Scientists have been able to demonstrate the induction of EpiSC-like cells in vitro from mouse ESCs, which are referred to as Epiblast-like cells (EpiLC). Many studies have used EpiLCs as suitable analogues for actual post-implantation derived epiblast stem cells, especially in attempts at reversion back to the "naive" state. Recently, overexpression of PR-domain Zinc Finger Protein 14 (PRDM14) in EpiLC was shown to cause a reversion back to an ESC-like state (with levels of Alkaline Phosphatase staining recovered to that observed in ESCs as well as more ESC-like cell morphology), with Klf2 being required for the mechanism to occur. It has been proposed that PRDM14 induces this state by activating Klf2 via active demethylation recruitment of Oct-4; such technique has yet to be demonstrated in actual epiblast-derived EpiSCs.
