= SIAH1 =

Protein-coding gene in the species Homo sapiens

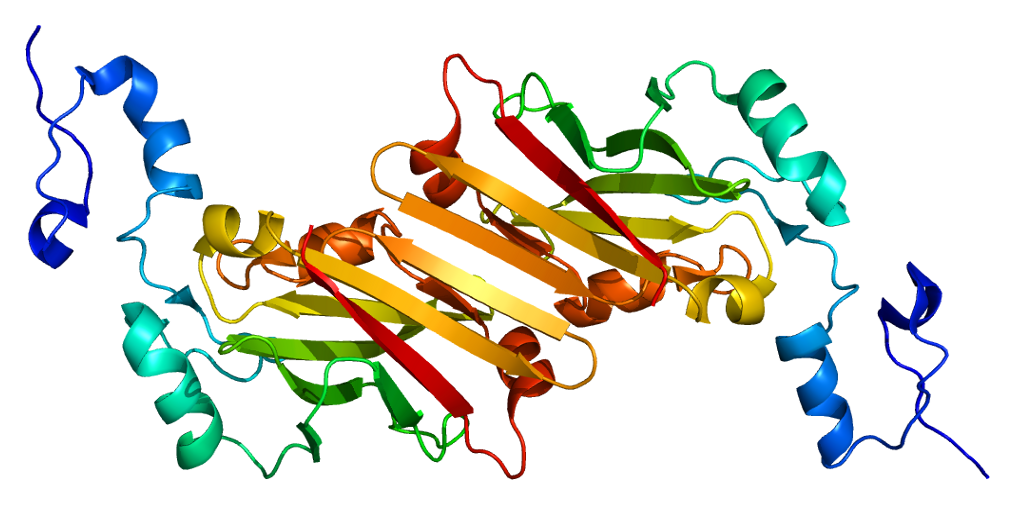

Identifiers
- Aliases: SIAH1, SIAH1A, siah E3 ubiquitin protein ligase 1, BURHAS
- External IDs: OMIM: 602212; MGI: 108064; GeneCards: SIAH1
Available structures
PDB	Ortholog search: PDBe RCSB
PDB	List of PDB id codes 2A25, 4C9Z, 4CA1, 4I7B, 4I7C, 4I7D, 4X3G
Enzyme activity
EC #	BRENDA	ExPASy	KEGG	MetaCyc
2.3.2.27	↗	↗	↗	↗

Gene location (Human)
Chr.	Chromosome 16 (human)
Band	16q12.1	Start	48,356,364 bp
Band	16q12.1	End	48,448,402 bp

Gene location (Mouse)
Chr.	Chromosome 8 (mouse)
Band	8 C3|8 42.1 cM	Start	87,450,635 bp
Band	8 C3|8 42.1 cM	End	87,472,562 bp
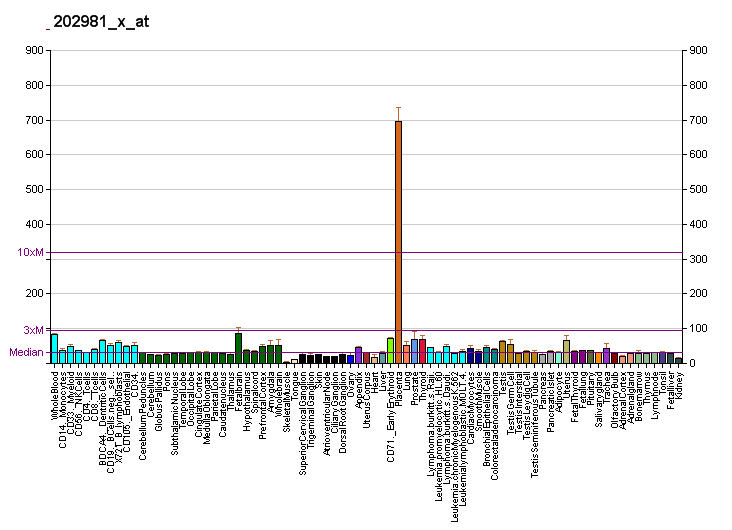

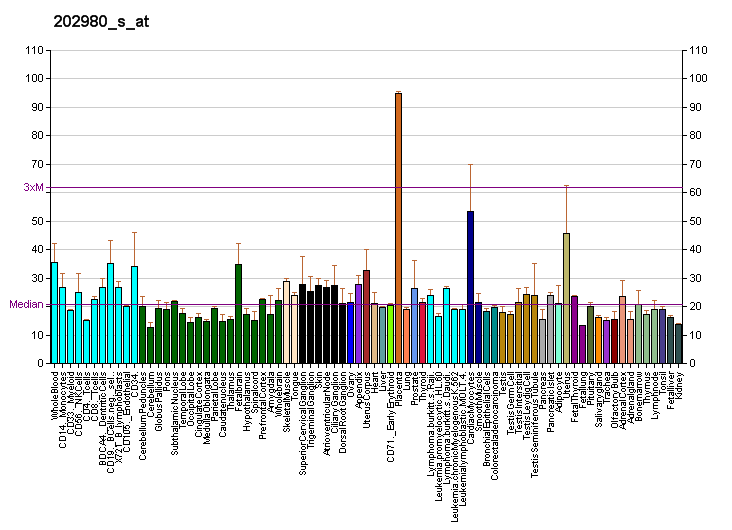
RNA expression pattern
Bgee	Human / Mouse (ortholog); Top expressed in: secondary oocyte; endothelial cell; ganglionic eminence; amniotic fluid; skin of hip; placenta; germinal epithelium; gonad; retinal pigment epithelium; skin of thigh / Top expressed in: secondary oocyte; medial ganglionic eminence; Rostral migratory stream; primary oocyte; barrel cortex; hair follicle; spermatocyte; retinal pigment epithelium; sexually immature organism; zygote; More reference expression data
BioGPS	More reference expression data
Gene ontology
Molecular function	metal ion binding; identical protein binding; ubiquitin protein ligase activity; protein binding; zinc ion binding; transferase activity; ubiquitin-protein transferase activity; protein C-terminus binding; ubiquitin conjugating enzyme binding
Cellular component	beta-catenin destruction complex; cytoplasm; nucleus; early endosome; cytosol; plasma membrane
Biological process	cell cycle; spermatogenesis; axon guidance; multicellular organism development; anatomical structure morphogenesis; positive regulation of intrinsic apoptotic signaling pathway; apoptotic process; protein catabolic process; positive regulation of apoptotic process; nervous system development; protein ubiquitination; cell differentiation; protein polyubiquitination; proteasome-mediated ubiquitin-dependent protein catabolic process; protein destabilization; neuron apoptotic process; ubiquitin-dependent protein catabolic process; negative regulation of netrin-activated signaling pathway
Sources:Amigo / QuickGO
Orthologs
Databases	NCBI: entry; OMA: entry
Species	Human	Mouse
Entrez	6477	20437
Ensembl	ENSG00000196470	ENSMUSG00000036840
UniProt	Q8IUQ4	P61092
RefSeq (mRNA)	NM_001006610; NM_003031; NM_001006611	NM_009172
RefSeq (protein)	NP_001006611; NP_003022	NP_033198
Location (UCSC)	Chr 16: 48.36 – 48.45 Mb	Chr 8: 87.45 – 87.47 Mb
PubMed search
- Wikidata
View/Edit Human	View/Edit Mouse

E3 ubiquitin-protein ligase SIAH1 is an enzyme that in humans is encoded by the SIAH1 gene.

== Function ==
This gene encodes for a polypeptide structure that is a member of the seven in absentia homolog (SIAH) family. The protein is an E3 ligase and is involved in ubiquitination and proteasome-mediated degradation of specific proteins. The activity of this ubiquitin ligase has been implicated in the development of certain forms of Parkinson's disease, the regulation of the cellular response to hypoxia and induction of apoptosis. Alternative splicing results in several additional transcript variants, some encoding different isoforms and others that have not been fully characterized.

== Interactions ==
SIAH1 has been shown to interact with:

- APC,
- BAG1,
- CACYBP,
- KHDRBS3,
- KIF22,
- NUMB,
- PEG10,
- PEG3
- POU2AF1,
- RBBP8, and
- TRIB3.
