= SIAH2 =

Protein-coding gene in the species Homo sapiens

Identifiers
- Aliases: SIAH2, hSiah2, siah E3 ubiquitin protein ligase 2
- External IDs: OMIM: 602213; MGI: 108062; GeneCards: SIAH2
Available structures
PDB	Ortholog search: PDBe RCSB
PDB	List of PDB id codes 5H9M
Enzyme activity
EC #	BRENDA	ExPASy	KEGG	MetaCyc
2.3.2.27	↗	↗	↗	↗

Gene location (Human)
Chr.	Chromosome 3 (human)
Band	3q25.1	Start	150,741,125 bp
Band	3q25.1	End	150,763,477 bp

Gene location (Mouse)
Chr.	Chromosome 3 (mouse)
Band	3 D|3 28.68 cM	Start	58,582,359 bp
Band	3 D|3 28.68 cM	End	58,599,821 bp
RNA expression pattern
Bgee	Human / Mouse (ortholog); Top expressed in: right adrenal cortex; left adrenal gland; left adrenal cortex; monocyte; ectocervix; right lobe of liver; blood; canal of the cervix; bone marrow; stromal cell of endometrium / Top expressed in: secondary oocyte; zygote; primary oocyte; seminiferous tubule; spermatid; olfactory epithelium; ankle joint; parotid gland; right kidney; islet of Langerhans; More reference expression data
BioGPS	n/a
Gene ontology
Molecular function	transcription corepressor activity; zinc ion binding; metal ion binding; protein binding; ubiquitin conjugating enzyme binding; transferase activity; ubiquitin-protein transferase activity; ubiquitin protein ligase activity
Cellular component	cytoplasm; cytosol; intracellular membrane-bounded organelle; nucleoplasm; soma; early endosome; neuron projection; nucleus
Biological process	negative regulation of cysteine-type endopeptidase activity involved in apoptotic process; small GTPase mediated signal transduction; regulation of protein ubiquitination; negative regulation of extrinsic apoptotic signaling pathway; negative regulation of apoptotic process; axon guidance; multicellular organism development; protein ubiquitination; cell cycle; negative regulation of canonical Wnt signaling pathway; apoptotic process; negative regulation of nucleic acid-templated transcription; protein polyubiquitination; protein deubiquitination; ubiquitin-dependent protein catabolic process; negative regulation of netrin-activated signaling pathway; proteasome-mediated ubiquitin-dependent protein catabolic process; regulation of circadian rhythm; rhythmic process
Sources:Amigo / QuickGO
Orthologs
Databases	NCBI: entry; OMA: entry
Species	Human	Mouse
Entrez	6478	20439
Ensembl	ENSG00000181788	ENSMUSG00000036432
UniProt	O43255	Q06986
RefSeq (mRNA)	NM_005067	NM_009174
RefSeq (protein)	NP_005058	NP_033200
Location (UCSC)	Chr 3: 150.74 – 150.76 Mb	Chr 3: 58.58 – 58.6 Mb
PubMed search
- Wikidata
View/Edit Human	View/Edit Mouse

E3 ubiquitin-protein ligase SIAH2 is an enzyme that in humans is encoded by the SIAH2 gene.

== Function ==
This gene encodes a protein that is a member of the seven in absentia homolog (SIAH) family. The protein is an E3 ligase and is involved in ubiquitination and proteasome-mediated degradation of specific proteins. The activity of this ubiquitin ligase has been implicated in regulating cellular response to hypoxia.

== Interactions ==
SIAH2 has been shown to interact with PEG10, Synaptophysin, PEG3 and VAV1.
