= PEG10 =

Protein-coding gene in the species Homo sapiens

Identifiers
- Aliases: PEG10, EDR, HB-1, MEF3L, Mar2, Mart2, RGAG3, paternally expressed 10, SIRH1, RTL2
- External IDs: OMIM: 609810; MGI: 2157785; GeneCards: PEG10

Gene location (Human)
Chr.	Chromosome 7 (human)
Band	7q21.3	Start	94,656,325 bp
Band	7q21.3	End	94,669,695 bp

Gene location (Mouse)
Chr.	Chromosome 6 (mouse)
Band	6 A1|6 1.81 cM	Start	4,747,306 bp
Band	6 A1|6 1.81 cM	End	4,760,517 bp
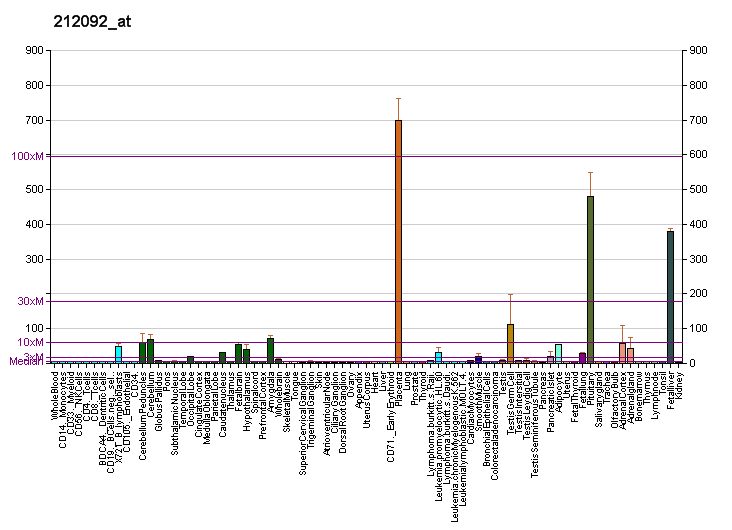

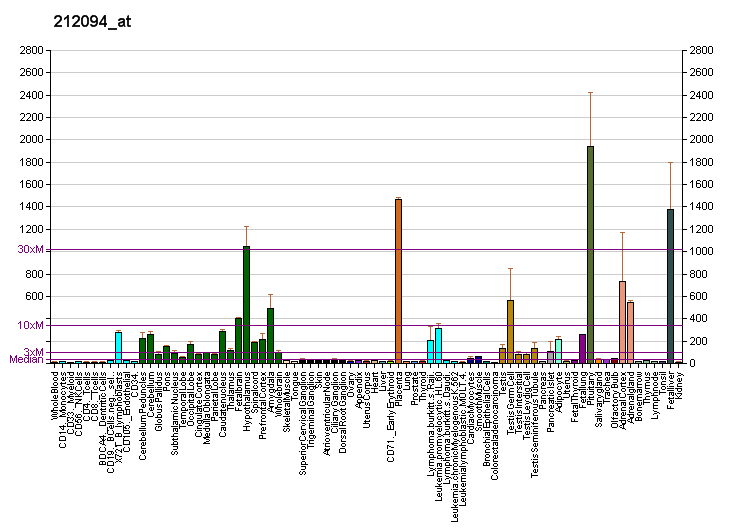
RNA expression pattern
Bgee	Human / Mouse (ortholog); Top expressed in: ventricular zone; ganglionic eminence; right adrenal cortex; left adrenal cortex; nucleus accumbens; pituitary gland; placenta; pars compacta; cerebellar vermis; hypothalamus / Top expressed in: yolk sac; tail of embryo; genital tubercle; ventricular zone; lumbar subsegment of spinal cord; superior frontal gyrus; dorsomedial hypothalamic nucleus; spermatocyte; supraoptic nucleus; primary visual cortex; More reference expression data
BioGPS	More reference expression data
Gene ontology
Molecular function	DNA binding; zinc ion binding; protein binding; metal ion binding; nucleic acid binding; RNA binding
Cellular component	cytoplasm; nucleus; cytosol
Biological process	cell differentiation; negative regulation of transforming growth factor beta receptor signaling pathway; apoptotic process
Sources:Amigo / QuickGO
Orthologs
Databases	NCBI: entry; OMA: entry
Species	Human	Mouse
Entrez	23089	170676
Ensembl	ENSG00000242265	ENSMUSG00000092035
UniProt	Q86TG7	Q7TN75
RefSeq (mRNA)	NM_015068; NM_001040152; NM_001172437; NM_001172438; NM_001184961 NM_001184962	NM_001040611; NM_130877
RefSeq (protein)	NP_001035242; NP_001165908; NP_001165909; NP_001171890; NP_001171891 NP_055883	NP_001035701; NP_570947
Location (UCSC)	Chr 7: 94.66 – 94.67 Mb	Chr 6: 4.75 – 4.76 Mb
PubMed search
- Wikidata
View/Edit Human	View/Edit Mouse

Retrotransposon-derived protein PEG10 is a protein that in humans is encoded by the PEG10 gene.

== Function ==
This gene includes two overlapping reading frames of the same transcript encoding distinct isoforms. The shorter isoform has a CCHC-type zinc finger motif containing a sequence characteristic of gag proteins of most retroviruses and some retrotransposons, and it functions in part by interacting with members of the TGF-beta receptor family. The longer isoform has the active-site DSG consensus sequence of the protease domain of pol proteins. The longer isoform is the result of -1 translational frameshifting that is also seen in some retroviruses. Expression of these two isoforms only comes from the paternal allele due to imprinting. Increased gene expression (as observed by an increase in mRNA levels) is associated with hepatocellular carcinomas.

PEG10 is a paternally expressed imprinted gene that is expressed in adult and embryonic tissues. Most notable expression occurs in the placenta. This gene is highly conserved across mammalian species and retains the heptanucleotide (GGGAAAC). This gene has been reported to play a role in cell proliferation, differentiation and apoptosis. Overexpression of this gene has been associated with several malignancies, such as hepatocellular carcinoma and B-cell lymphocytic leukemia. Knockout mice lacking this gene showed early embryonic lethality with placental defects, indicating the importance of this gene in embryonic development. In preeclampsia placental tissue, PEG10 has been shown to be downregulated and upregulated implicating it as a possible causal role in the occurrence of preeclampsia.

== Interactions ==
PEG10 has been shown to interact with SIAH2 and SIAH1.
