= PEG3 =

Protein-coding gene in the species Homo sapiens

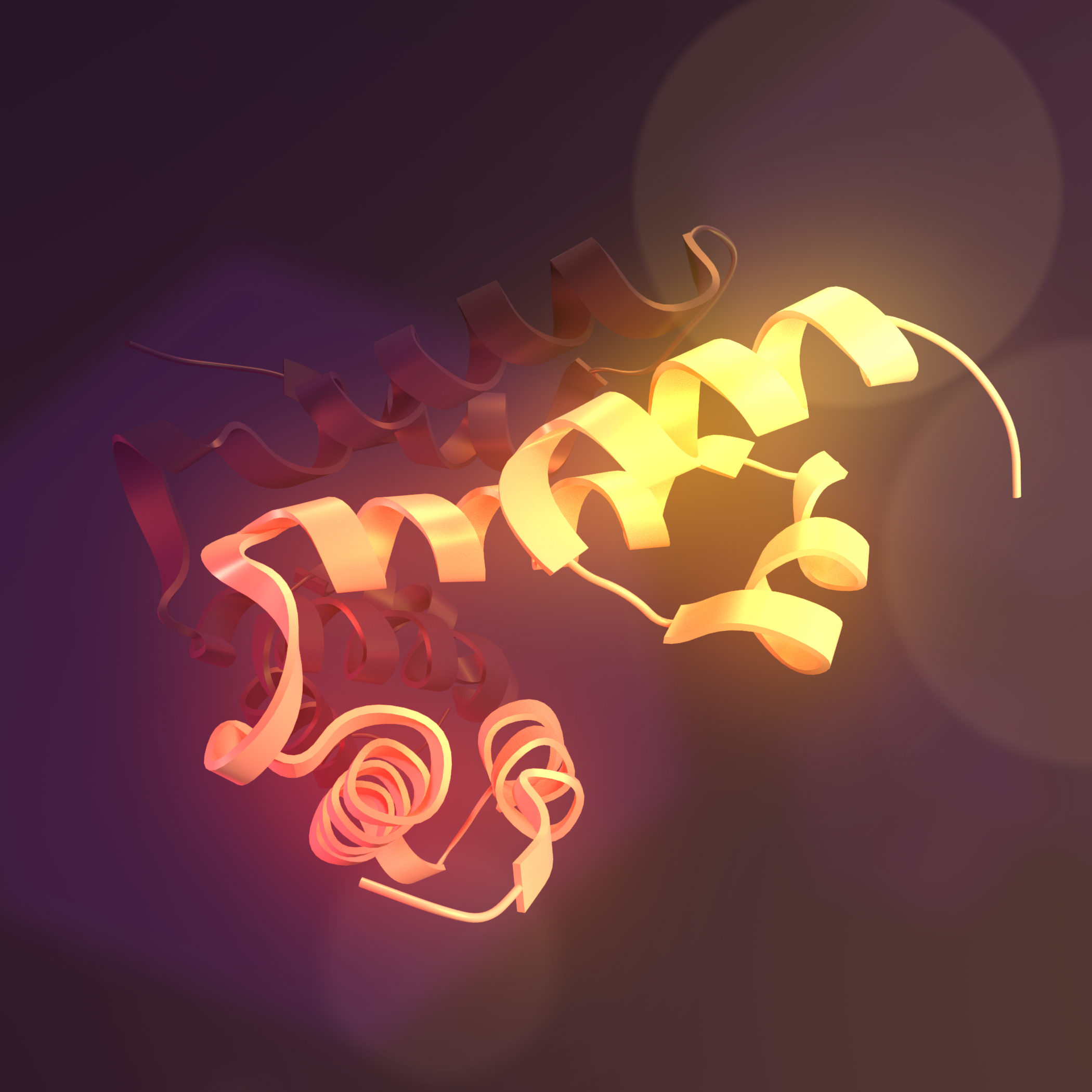

Identifiers
- Aliases: PEG3, PW1, ZKSCAN22, ZNF904, ZSCAN24, paternally expressed 3
- External IDs: OMIM: 601483; MGI: 104748; GeneCards: PEG3
Available structures
PDB	Ortholog search: PDBe RCSB
PDB	List of PDB id codes 4BHX

Gene location (Human)
Chr.	Chromosome 19 (human)
Band	19q13.43	Start	56,810,077 bp
Band	19q13.43	End	56,840,728 bp

Gene location (Mouse)
Chr.	Chromosome 7 (mouse)
Band	7 A1|7 3.89 cM	Start	6,703,892 bp
Band	7 A1|7 3.89 cM	End	6,730,431 bp
RNA expression pattern
Bgee	Human / Mouse (ortholog); Top expressed in: endothelial cell; superior vestibular nucleus; lateral nuclear group of thalamus; Brodmann area 23; pons; Epithelium of choroid plexus; middle temporal gyrus; ventral tegmental area; external globus pallidus; dorsal motor nucleus of vagus nerve / Top expressed in: umbilical cord; condyle; medullary collecting duct; pituitary gland; substantia nigra; ventromedial nucleus; fossa; human fetus; dorsomedial hypothalamic nucleus; abdominal wall; More reference expression data
BioGPS	n/a
Gene ontology
Molecular function	DNA-binding transcription factor activity; metal ion binding; nucleic acid binding; DNA-binding transcription factor activity, RNA polymerase II-specific
Cellular component	cytoplasm; nucleus; autophagosome
Biological process	apoptotic process; regulation of gene expression; regulation of transcription, DNA-templated; negative regulation of transcription by RNA polymerase II; positive regulation of transcription by RNA polymerase II
Sources:Amigo / QuickGO
Orthologs
Databases	NCBI: entry; OMA: entry
Species	Human	Mouse
Entrez	5178	18616
Ensembl	ENSG00000198300	ENSMUSG00000002265
UniProt	Q9GZU2	Q3URU2
RefSeq (mRNA)	NM_006210; NM_001146184; NM_001146185; NM_001146186; NM_001146187	NM_008817
RefSeq (protein)	NP_001139656; NP_001139657; NP_001139658; NP_001139659; NP_006201	NP_032843
Location (UCSC)	Chr 19: 56.81 – 56.84 Mb	Chr 7: 6.7 – 6.73 Mb
PubMed search
- Wikidata
View/Edit Human	View/Edit Mouse

Paternally-expressed gene 3 protein is a protein that in humans is encoded by the PEG3 gene. PEG3 is an imprinted gene expressed exclusively from the paternal allele and plays important roles in controlling fetal growth rates and nurturing behaviors as has potential roles in mammalian reproduction. PEG3 is a transcription factor that binds to DNA [11-13] via the sequence motif AGTnnCnnnTGGCT, which it binds to using multiple Kruppel-like factors. It also regulate the expression of Pgm2l1 through the binding of the motif.

== Interactions ==
PEG3 has been shown to interact with SIAH2 and SIAH1. kjh-5oil2-*m jhac-*n.,myr0.
