= SOX2 =

Transcription factor gene of the SOX family

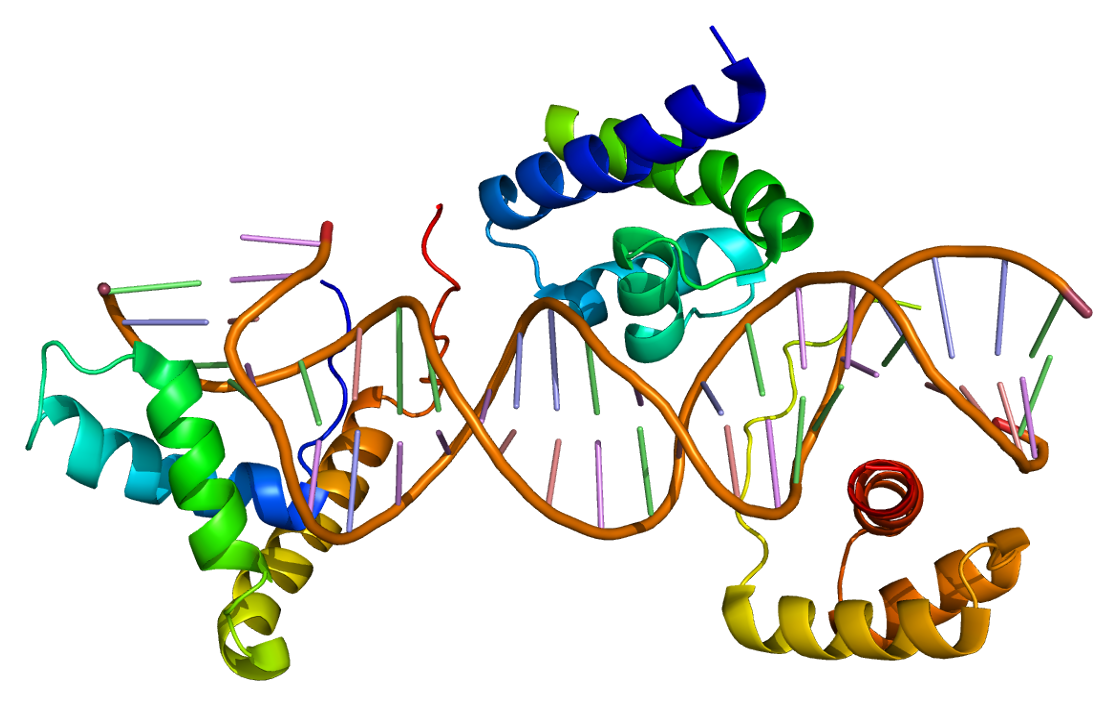

Identifiers
- Aliases: SOX2, ANOP3, MCOPS3, SRY-box 2, Sox2, SRY-box transcription factor 2
- External IDs: OMIM: 184429; MGI: 98364; GeneCards: SOX2
Available structures
PDB	Ortholog search: PDBe RCSB
PDB	List of PDB id codes 1O4X, 2LE4

Gene location (Human)
Chr.	Chromosome 3 (human)
Band	3q26.33	Start	181,711,925 bp
Band	3q26.33	End	181,714,436 bp

Gene location (Mouse)
Chr.	Chromosome 3 (mouse)
Band	3 A3|3 16.93 cM	Start	34,704,554 bp
Band	3 A3|3 16.93 cM	End	34,706,610 bp
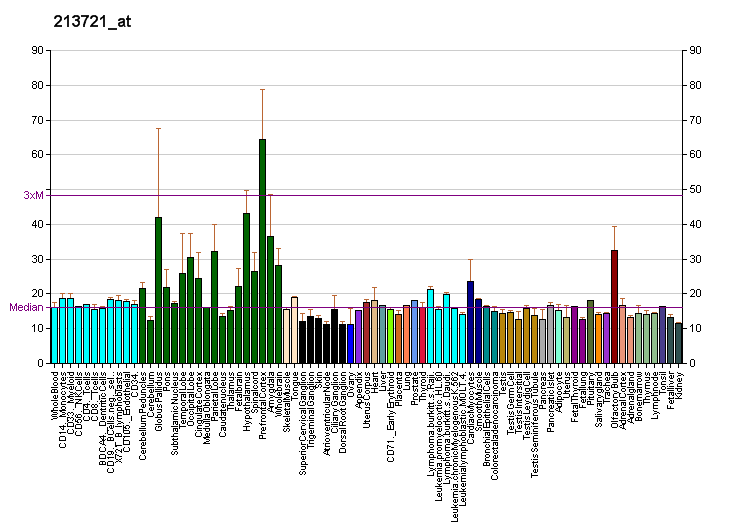

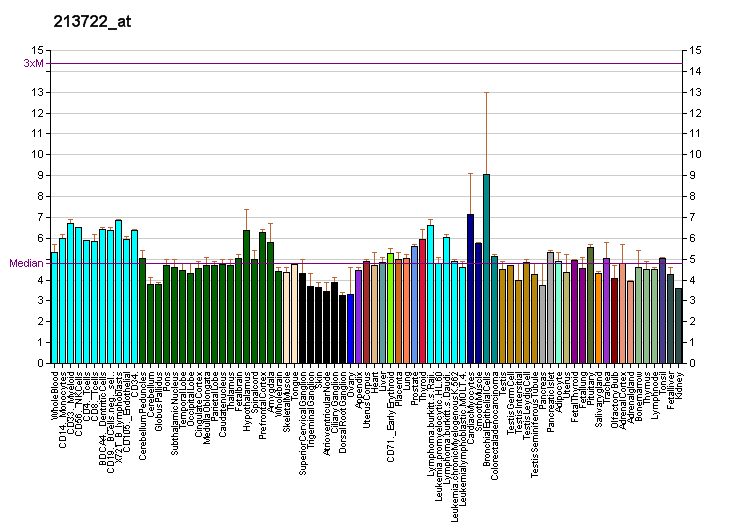
RNA expression pattern
Bgee	Human / Mouse (ortholog); Top expressed in: ventricular zone; bronchial epithelial cell; ganglionic eminence; external globus pallidus; pars reticulata; dorsal motor nucleus of vagus nerve; ventral tegmental area; superior vestibular nucleus; oral cavity; subthalamic nucleus / Top expressed in: medial ganglionic eminence; tooth germ; enamel organ; Rostral migratory stream; suprachiasmatic nucleus; vestibular sensory epithelium; ventricular zone; lateral septal nucleus; superior surface of tongue; median eminence; More reference expression data
BioGPS	More reference expression data
Gene ontology
Molecular function	DNA binding; sequence-specific DNA binding; miRNA binding; DNA-binding transcription factor activity; DNA-binding transcription activator activity, RNA polymerase II-specific; transcription cis-regulatory region binding; protein binding; DNA-binding transcription factor activity, RNA polymerase II-specific
Cellular component	cytoplasm; cytosol; transcription regulator complex; nucleoplasm; nucleus
Biological process	eye development; pituitary gland development; regulation of transcription, DNA-templated; negative regulation of neuron differentiation; somatic stem cell population maintenance; endodermal cell fate specification; positive regulation of cell-cell adhesion; tissue regeneration; negative regulation of transcription by RNA polymerase II; chromatin organization; transcription by RNA polymerase II; regulation of cysteine-type endopeptidase activity involved in apoptotic process; adenohypophysis development; transcription, DNA-templated; neuronal stem cell population maintenance; positive regulation of transcription, DNA-templated; multicellular organism development; glial cell fate commitment; response to wounding; osteoblast differentiation; positive regulation of cell differentiation; negative regulation of epithelial cell proliferation; regulation of gene expression; inner ear development; forebrain development; response to growth factor; negative regulation of canonical Wnt signaling pathway; positive regulation of MAPK cascade; positive regulation of transcription by RNA polymerase II; cytokine-mediated signaling pathway; cell differentiation; cell fate commitment; central nervous system development; neuron differentiation
Sources:Amigo / QuickGO
Orthologs
Databases	NCBI: entry; OMA: entry
Species	Human	Mouse
Entrez	6657	20674
Ensembl	ENSG00000181449	ENSMUSG00000074637
UniProt	P48431	P48432
RefSeq (mRNA)	NM_003106	NM_011443
RefSeq (protein)	NP_003097	NP_035573
Location (UCSC)	Chr 3: 181.71 – 181.71 Mb	Chr 3: 34.7 – 34.71 Mb
PubMed search
- Wikidata
View/Edit Human	View/Edit Mouse

SRY (sex determining region Y)-box 2, also known as SOX2, is a transcription factor that is essential for maintaining self-renewal, or pluripotency, of undifferentiated embryonic stem cells. Sox2 has a critical role in maintenance of embryonic and neural stem cells.

Sox2 is a member of the Sox family of transcription factors, which have been shown to play key roles in many stages of mammalian development. This protein family shares highly conserved DNA binding domains known as HMG (High-mobility group) box domains containing approximately 80 amino acids.

Sox2 holds promise in research involving induced pluripotency, an emerging field of regenerative medicine.

== Function ==
=== Stem cell pluripotency ===
LIF (Leukemia inhibitory factor) signaling, which maintains pluripotency in mouse embryonic stem cells, activates Sox2 downstream of the JAK-STAT signaling pathway and subsequent activation of Klf4 (a member of the family of Kruppel-like factors). Oct-4, Sox2 and Nanog positively regulate transcription of all pluripotency circuitry proteins in the LIF pathway.

NPM1, a transcriptional regulator involved in cell proliferation, individually forms complexes with Sox2, Oct4 and Nanog in embryonic stem cells. These three pluripotency factors contribute to a complex molecular network that regulates a number of genes controlling pluripotency. Sox2 binds to DNA cooperatively with Oct4 at non-palindromic sequences to activate transcription of key pluripotency factors. Surprisingly, regulation of Oct4-Sox2 enhancers can occur without Sox2, likely due to expression of other Sox proteins. However, a group of researchers concluded that the primary role of Sox2 in embryonic stem cells is controlling Oct4 expression, and they both perpetuate their own expression when expressed concurrently.

In an experiment involving mouse embryonic stem cells, it was discovered that Sox2 in conjunction with Oct4, c-Myc and Klf4 were sufficient for producing induced pluripotent stem cells. The discovery that expression of only four transcription factors was necessary to induce pluripotency allowed future regenerative medicine research to be conducted considering minor manipulations.

Loss of pluripotency is regulated by hypermethylation of some Sox2 and Oct4 binding sites in male germ cells and post-transcriptional suppression of Sox2 by miR134.

Varying levels of Sox2 affect embryonic stem cells' fate of differentiation. Sox2 inhibits differentiation into the mesendoderm germ layer and promotes differentiation into neural ectoderm germ layer. Npm1/Sox2 complexes are sustained when differentiation is induced along the ectodermal lineage, emphasizing an important functional role for Sox2 in ectodermal differentiation. The loss of Sox2 has also been shown to affect naïve pluripotency, with Sox2-depleted mouse embryonic cells becoming able to differentiate into extraembryonic trophoblast.

Deficiency of Sox2 in mice has been shown to result in neural malformities and eventually fetal death, further underlining Sox2's vital role in embryonic development.

=== Neural stem cells ===
In neurogenesis, Sox2 is expressed throughout developing cells in the neural tube as well as in proliferating central nervous system progenitors. However, Sox2 is downregulated during progenitors' final cell cycle during differentiation when they become post mitotic. Cells expressing Sox2 are capable of both producing cells identical to themselves and differentiated neural cell types, two necessary hallmarks of stem cells. Thus signals controlling Sox2 expression in the presumptive neuronal compartment, like Notch signaling, control what size the neuronal compartment finally reaches. Proliferation of Sox2+ neural stem cells can generate neural precursors as well as Sox2+ neural stem cell population. Differences in brain size between the species thus relate to the capacity of different species to maintain SOX2 expression in the developing neural systems. The difference in brain size between humans and apes, for instance, has been linked to mutations in the gene Asb11, which is an upstream activator of SOX2 in the developing neural system.

Induced pluripotency is possible using adult neural stem cells, which express higher levels of Sox2 and c-Myc than embryonic stem cells. Therefore, only two exogenous factors, one of which is necessarily Oct4, are sufficient for inducing pluripotent cells from neural stem cells, lessening the complications and risks associated with introducing multiple factors to induce pluripotency.

=== Eye deformities ===
Mutations in this gene have been linked with bilateral anophthalmia, a severe structural eye deformity.

=== Cancer ===
In lung development, Sox2 controls the branching morphogenesis of the bronchial tree and differentiation of the epithelium of airways. Overexpression causes an increase in neuroendocrine, gastric/intestinal and basal cells. Under normal conditions, Sox2 is critical for maintaining self-renewal and appropriate proportion of basal cells in adult tracheal epithelium. However, its overexpression gives rise to extensive epithelial hyperplasia and eventually carcinoma in both developing and adult mouse lungs.

In squamous cell carcinoma, gene amplifications frequently target the 3q26.3 region. The gene for Sox2 lies within this region, which effectively characterizes Sox2 as an oncogene, although in adenocarcinoma of the esophagus loss of Sox2 is strongly associated with worse prognosis, effectively characterising Sox2 as a tumor suppressor. It thus fair to say that the function of SOX2 in cancer is pleiotropic. Sox2 is a key upregulated factor in lung squamous cell carcinoma, directing many genes involved in tumor progression. Sox2 overexpression cooperates with loss of Lkb1 expression to promote squamous cell lung cancer in mice. Its overexpression also activates cellular migration and anchorage-independent growth.

Sox2 expression is also found in high gleason grade prostate cancer, and promotes castration-resistant prostate cancer growth.

The ectopic expression of SOX2 may be related to abnormal differentiation of colorectal cancer cells.

Sox2 has been shown to be relevant in the development of Tamoxifen resistance in breast cancer.

In Glioblastoma multiforme, Sox2 is a well-established stem cell transcription factor needed to induce and maintain stemness properties of glioblastoma cancer cells.

== Regulation by thyroid hormone ==
There are three thyroid hormone response elements (TREs) in the region upstream of the Sox2 promoter. This region is known as the enhancer region. Studies have suggested that thyroid hormone (T3) controls Sox2 expression via the enhancer region. The expression of TRα1 (thyroid hormone receptor) is increased in proliferating and migrating neural stem cells. It has therefore been suggested that transcriptional repression of Sox2, mediated by the thyroid hormone signaling axis, allows for neural stem cell commitment and migration from the sub-ventricular zone. A deficiency of thyroid hormone, particularly during the first trimester, will lead to abnormal central nervous system development. Further supporting this conclusion is the fact that hypothyroidism during fetal development can result in a variety of neurological deficiencies, including cretinism, characterized by stunted physical development and intellectual disability.

Hypothyroidism can arise from a multitude of causes, and is commonly remedied with hormone treatments such as the commonly used Levothyroxine.

== Interactions ==
SOX2 has been shown to interact with PAX6, NPM1, and Oct4. SOX2 has been found to cooperatively regulate Rex1 with Oct3/4.
