= Homeobox protein NANOG =

Mammalian protein found in humans

NANOG
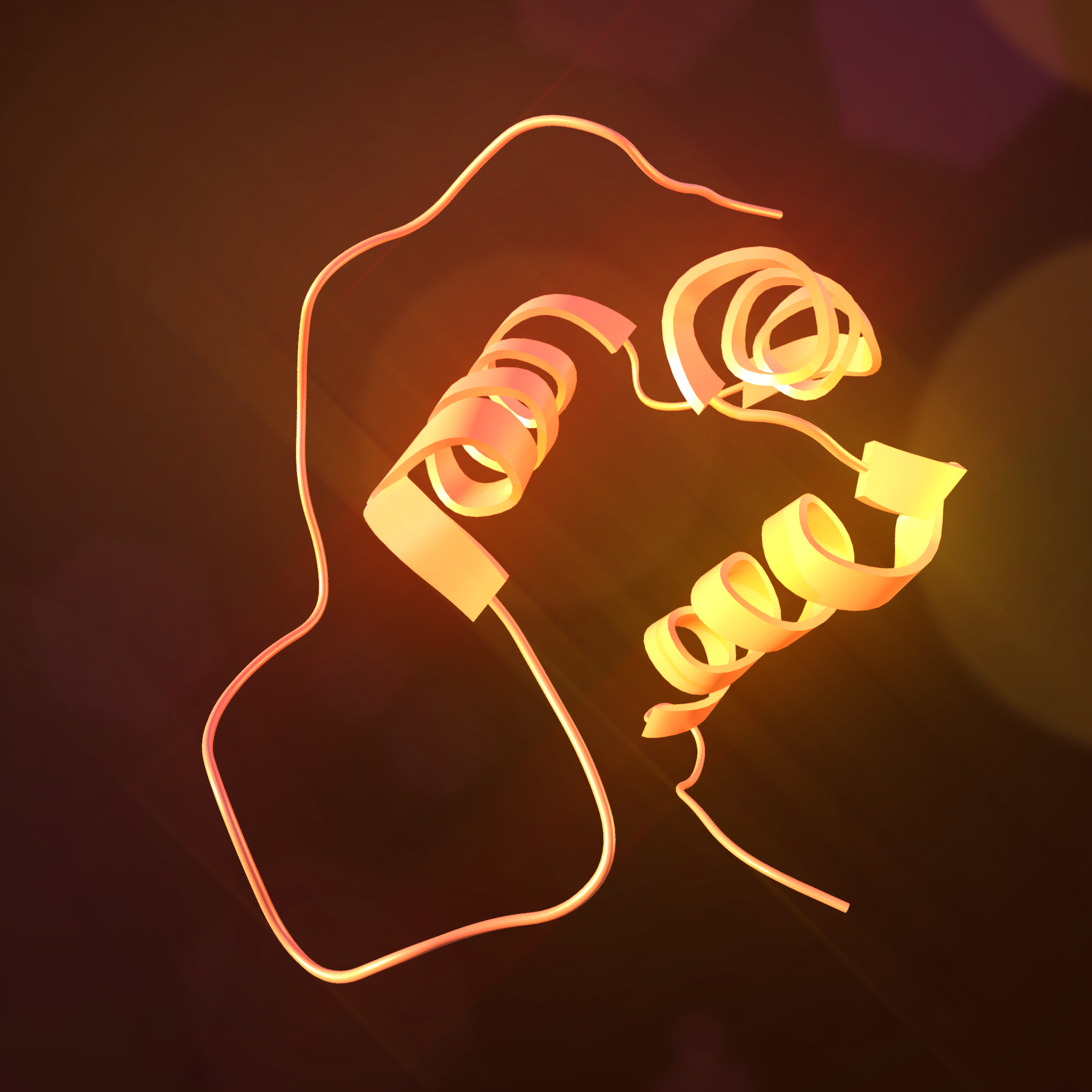

Identifiers
- Aliases: NANOG, entrez:79923, Nanog, Nanog homeobox
- External IDs: OMIM: 607937; MGI: 1919200; GeneCards: NANOG
Available structures
PDB	Ortholog search: PDBe RCSB
PDB	List of PDB id codes 2KT0

Gene location (Human)
Chr.	Chromosome 12 (human)
Band	12p13.31	Start	7,787,794 bp
Band	12p13.31	End	7,799,146 bp

Gene location (Mouse)
Chr.	Chromosome 6 (mouse)
Band	6|6 F1	Start	122,684,448 bp
Band	6|6 F1	End	122,691,592 bp
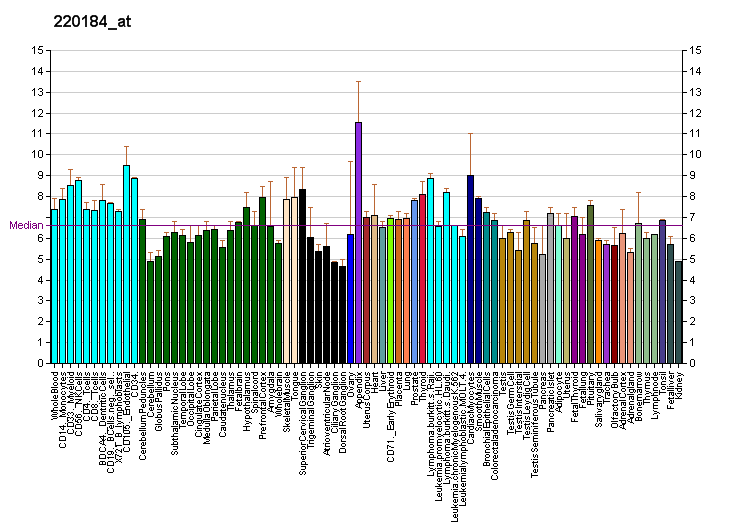
RNA expression pattern
Bgee	Human / Mouse (ortholog); Top expressed in: gonad; pericardium; cardia; thymus; mucosa of pharynx; ventral tegmental area; body of tongue; superior surface of tongue; trigeminal ganglion; synovial joint / Top expressed in: blastocyst; epiblast; inner cell mass; morula; embryo; ureter; ectoderm; primordial germ cell; embryo; pharynx; More reference expression data
BioGPS	More reference expression data
Gene ontology
Molecular function	DNA-binding transcription factor activity; DNA binding; sequence-specific DNA binding; protein binding; transcription corepressor activity; RNA polymerase II transcription regulatory region sequence-specific DNA binding; DNA-binding transcription activator activity, RNA polymerase II-specific; DNA-binding transcription factor activity, RNA polymerase II-specific; RNA polymerase II cis-regulatory region sequence-specific DNA binding
Cellular component	nucleolus; nucleus; nucleoplasm
Biological process	regulation of gene expression; regulation of cell differentiation; multicellular organism development; cell differentiation; cell population proliferation; regulation of transcription, DNA-templated; somatic stem cell population maintenance; transcription, DNA-templated; positive regulation of transcription by RNA polymerase II; endodermal cell fate specification; negative regulation of nucleic acid-templated transcription; stem cell population maintenance; transcription by RNA polymerase II; cytokine-mediated signaling pathway; regulation of transcription by RNA polymerase II; positive regulation of stem cell proliferation
Sources:Amigo / QuickGO
Orthologs
Databases	NCBI: entry; OMA: entry
Species	Human	Mouse
Entrez	79923	71950
Ensembl	ENSG00000111704	ENSMUSG00000012396
UniProt	Q9H9S0	Q80Z64
RefSeq (mRNA)	NM_001297698; NM_024865	NM_028016; NM_001289828; NM_001289830; NM_001289831
RefSeq (protein)	NP_001284627; NP_079141	NP_001276757; NP_001276759; NP_001276760; NP_082292
Location (UCSC)	Chr 12: 7.79 – 7.8 Mb	Chr 6: 122.68 – 122.69 Mb
PubMed search
- Wikidata
View/Edit Human	View/Edit Mouse

Homeobox protein NANOG (hNanog) is a transcriptional factor that helps embryonic stem cells (ESCs) maintain pluripotency by suppressing cell determination factors. hNanog is encoded in humans by the NANOG gene. Several types of cancer are associated with NANOG.

== Etymology ==
The name NANOG derives from Tír na nÓg (Irish for "Land of the Young"), a name given to the Celtic Otherworld in Irish and Scottish mythology.

== Structure ==
The human hNanog protein coded by the NANOG gene, consists of 305 amino acids and possesses 3 functional domains: the N-terminal domain, the C- terminal domain, and the conserved homeodomain motif. The homeodomain region facilitates DNA binding. The NANOG is located on chromosome 12, and the mRNA contains a 915 bp open reading frame (ORF) with 4 exons and 3 introns.

The N-terminal region of hNanog is rich in serine, threonine and proline residues, and the C-terminus contains a tryptophan-rich domain. The homeodomain in hNANOG ranges from residues 95 to 155. There are also additional NANOG genes (NANOG2, NANOG p8) which potentially affect ESCs' differentiation. Scientists have shown that NANOG is fundamental for self-renewal and pluripotency, and NANOG p8 is highly expressed in cancer cells.

== Function ==
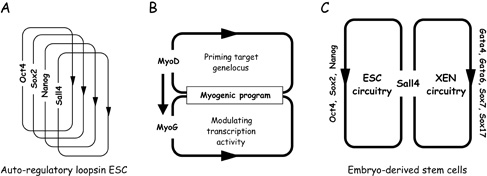
Transcription programs in embryonic stem cells

NANOG is a transcription factor in embryonic stem cells (ESCs) and is thought to be a key factor in maintaining pluripotency. NANOG is thought to function in concert with other factors such as POU5F1 (Oct-4) and SOX2 to establish ESC identity. These cells offer an important area of study because of their ability to maintain pluripotency. In other words, these cells have the ability to become virtually any cell of any of the three germ layers (endoderm, ectoderm, mesoderm). It is for this reason that understanding the mechanisms that maintain a cell's pluripotency is critical for researchers to understand how stem cells work, and may lead to future advances in treating degenerative diseases.

NANOG has been described to be expressed in the posterior side of the epiblast at the onset of gastrulation. There, NANOG has been implicated in inhibiting embryonic hematopoiesis by repressing the expression of the transcription factor Tal1. In this embryonic stage, NANOG represses Pou3f1, a transcription factor crucial for the anterior-posterior axis formation.

Analysis of arrested embryos demonstrated that embryos express pluripotency marker genes such as POU5F1, NANOG and Rex1. Derived human ESC lines also expressed specific pluripotency markers:

- TRA-1-60
- TRA-1-81
- SSEA4
- alkaline phosphatase
- TERT
- Rex1

These markers allowed for the differentiation in vitro and in vivo conditions into derivatives of all three germ layers.

POU5F1, TDGF1 (CRIPTO), SALL4, LECT1, and BUB1 are also related genes all responsible for self-renewal and pluripotent differentiation.

The NANOG protein has been found to be a transcriptional activator for the Rex1 promoter, playing a key role in sustaining Rex1 expression. Knockdown of NANOG in embryonic stem cells results in a reduction of Rex1 expression, while forced expression of NANOG stimulates Rex1 expression.

Besides the effects of NANOG in the embryonic stages of life, ectopic expression of NANOG in the adult stem cells can restore the proliferation and differentiation potential that is lost due to organismal aging or cellular senescence.

== Clinical significance ==
=== Cancer ===
NANOG is highly expressed in cancer stem cells and may thus function as an oncogene to promote carcinogenesis. High expression of NANOG correlates with poor survival in cancer patients.

Recent research has shown that the localization of NANOG and other transcription factors have potential consequences on cellular function. Experimental evidence has shown that the level of NANOG p8 expression is elevated specially in cancer cells, which mean that NANOG p8 gene is a critical member in (CSCs) Cancer stem cells, so knocking it down could reduce the cancer malignancy.

=== Diagnostics ===
NANOG p8 gene has been evaluated as a prognostic and predictive cancer biomarker.

== Cancer stem cells ==
Nanog is a transcription factor that controls both self-renewal and pluripotency of embryonic stem cells. Similarly, the expression of Nanog family proteins is increased in many types of cancer and correlates with a worse prognosis.

== Evolution ==
Humans and chimpanzees share ten NANOG pseudogenes (NanogP2-P11) during evaluation, two of them are located on the X chromosome and they characterized by the 5’ promoter sequences and the absence of introns as a result of mRNA retrotransposition all in the same places: one duplication pseudogene and nine retropseudogenes. Of the nine shared NANOG retropseudogenes, two lack the poly-(A) tails characteristic of most retropseudogenes, indicating that copying errors occurred during their creation. Due to the high improbability that the same pseudogenes (copying errors included) would exist in the same places in two unrelated genomes, evolutionary biologists point to NANOG and its pseudogenes as providing evidence of common descent between humans and chimpanzees.

== See also ==
- Enhancer
- Histone
- Oct-4
- Pribnow box
- Promoter
- RNA polymerase
- Brachyury
- Transcription factors
- Gene regulatory network
- Bioinformatics
