= Oct-4 =

Mammalian protein found in Homo sapiens

POU5F1
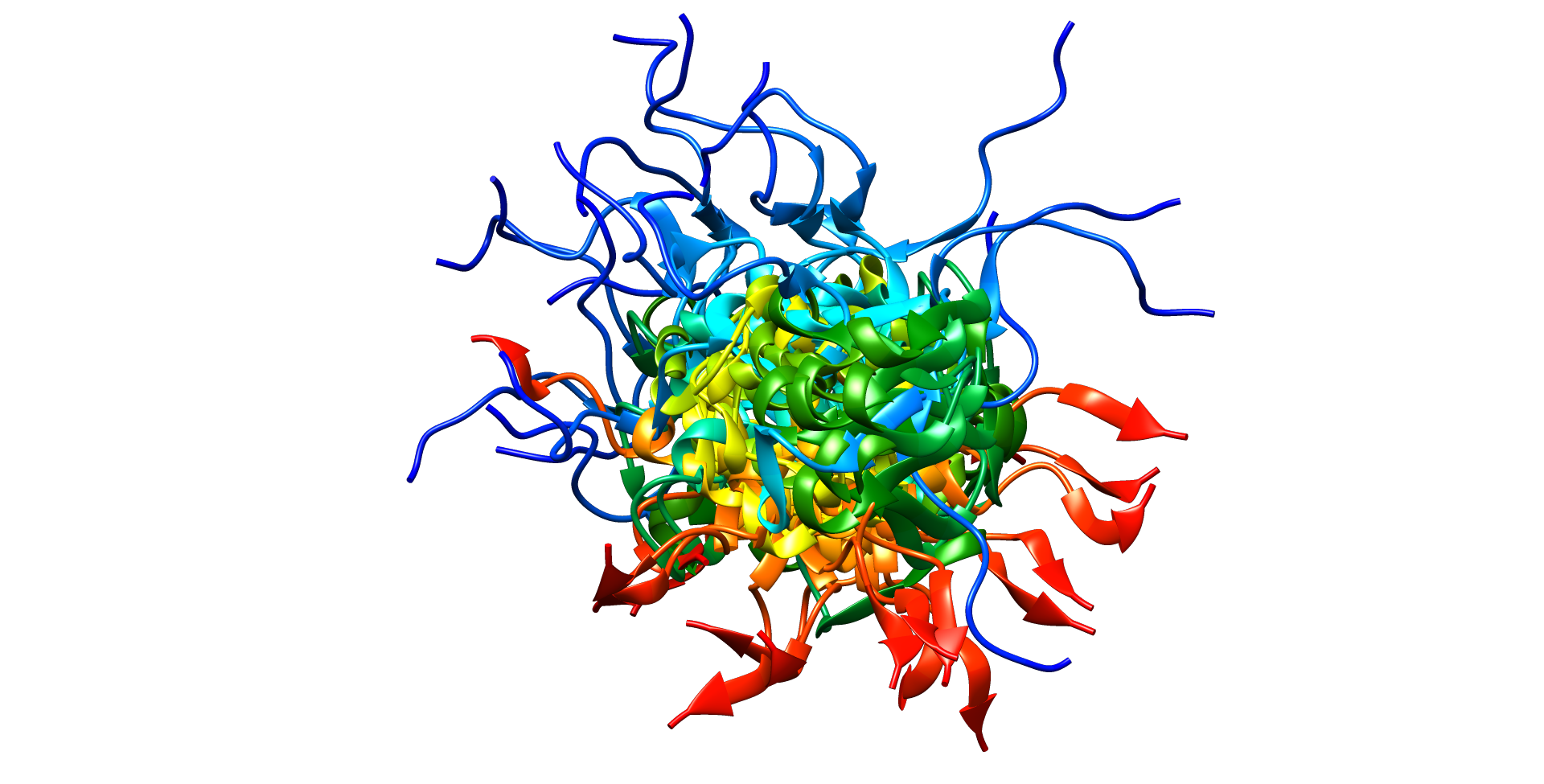

Identifiers
- Aliases: POU5F1, OCT3, OCT4, OTF-3, OTF3, OTF4, Oct-3, Oct-4, POU class 5 homeobox 1, Oct3/4
- External IDs: OMIM: 164177; MGI: 101893; GeneCards: POU5F1
Available structures
PDB	Ortholog search: PDBe RCSB
PDB	List of PDB id codes 1OCP, 3L1P

Gene location (Human)
Chr.	Chromosome 6 (human)
Band	6p21.33	Start	31,164,337 bp
Band	6p21.33	End	31,180,731 bp

Gene location (Mouse)
Chr.	Chromosome 17 (mouse)
Band	17 B1|17 18.69 cM	Start	35,816,915 bp
Band	17 B1|17 18.69 cM	End	35,821,669 bp
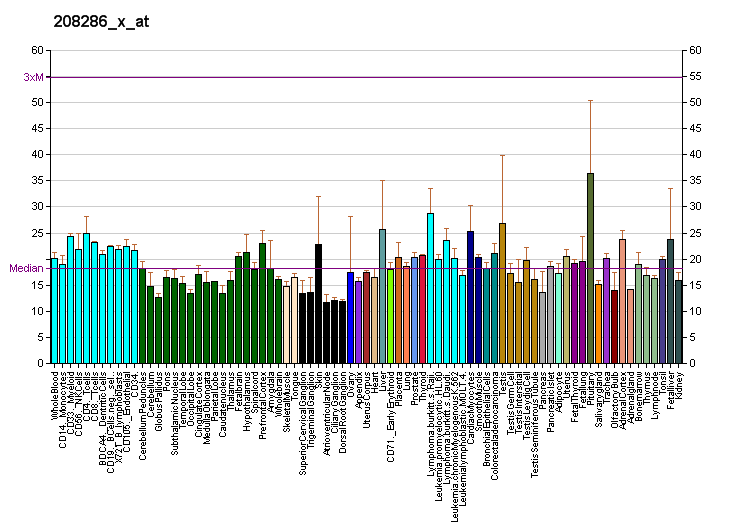

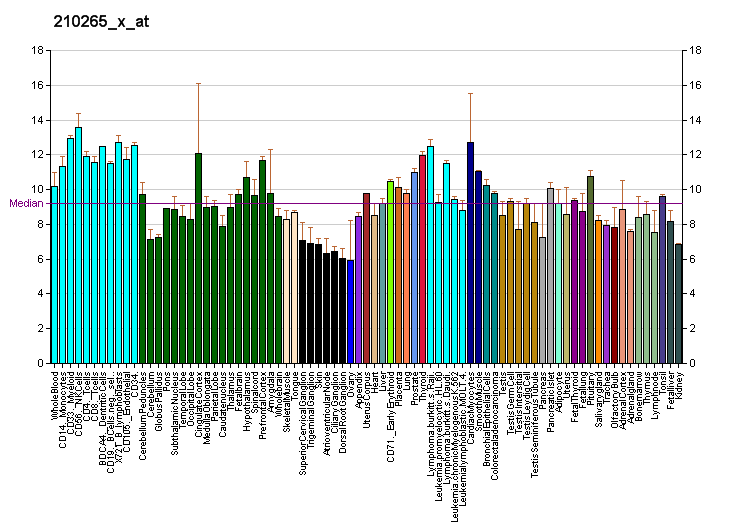

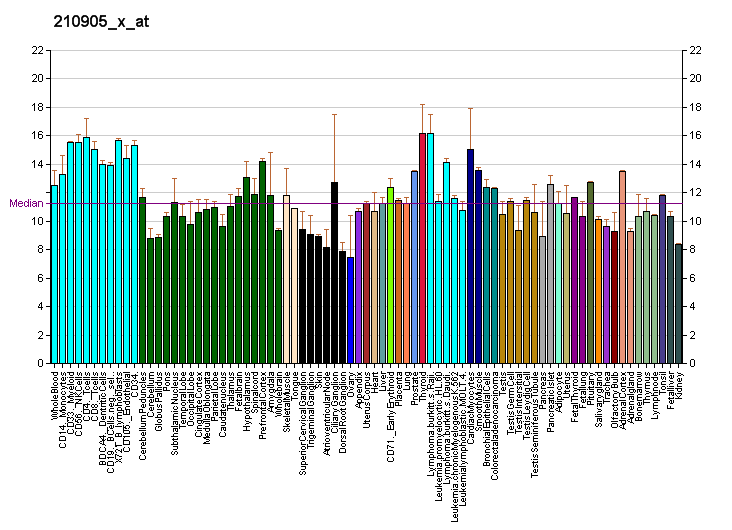
RNA expression pattern
Bgee	Human / Mouse (ortholog); Top expressed in: gonad; right uterine tube; endometrium; human kidney; body of pancreas; body of stomach; mucosa of transverse colon; testicle; left uterine tube; fundus / Top expressed in: blastocyst; epiblast; embryo; morula; morula; primordial germ cell; zygote; inner cell mass; primitive streak; ooblast; More reference expression data
BioGPS	More reference expression data
Gene ontology
Molecular function	DNA binding; sequence-specific DNA binding; miRNA binding; DNA-binding transcription factor activity; transcription factor binding; transcription cis-regulatory region binding; protein binding; DNA-binding transcription repressor activity, RNA polymerase II-specific; DNA-binding transcription factor activity, RNA polymerase II-specific; ubiquitin protein ligase binding; RNA binding
Cellular component	cytoplasm; cytosol; transcription regulator complex; nucleoplasm; nucleus; mitochondrion
Biological process	regulation of transcription, DNA-templated; somatic stem cell population maintenance; negative regulation of gene silencing by miRNA; cell fate commitment involved in formation of primary germ layer; endodermal cell fate specification; anatomical structure morphogenesis; mRNA transcription by RNA polymerase II; regulation of asymmetric cell division; negative regulation of transcription by RNA polymerase II; transcription by RNA polymerase II; transcription, DNA-templated; regulation of DNA methylation-dependent heterochromatin assembly; multicellular organism development; cardiac cell fate determination; response to wounding; BMP signaling pathway involved in heart induction; regulation of gene expression; regulation of heart induction by regulation of canonical Wnt signaling pathway; blastocyst development; positive regulation of transcription by RNA polymerase II; positive regulation of SMAD protein signal transduction
Sources:Amigo / QuickGO
Orthologs
Databases	NCBI: entry; OMA: entry
Species	Human	Mouse
Entrez	5460	18999
Ensembl	ENSG00000230336; ENSG00000206454; ENSG00000204531; ENSG00000237582; ENSG00000229094 ENSG00000233911; ENSG00000235068	ENSMUSG00000024406
UniProt	Q01860	P20263
RefSeq (mRNA)	NM_203289; NM_001173531; NM_001285986; NM_001285987; NM_002701	NM_001252452; NM_013633
RefSeq (protein)	NP_001167002; NP_001272915; NP_001272916; NP_002692; NP_976034 NP_001272915.1	NP_001239381; NP_038661
Location (UCSC)	Chr 6: 31.16 – 31.18 Mb	Chr 17: 35.82 – 35.82 Mb
PubMed search
- Wikidata
View/Edit Human	View/Edit Mouse

Oct-4 (octamer-binding transcription factor 4), also known as POU5F1 (POU domain, class 5, transcription factor 1), is a protein that in humans is encoded by the POU5F1 gene. Oct-4 is a homeodomain transcription factor of the POU family. It is critically involved in the self-renewal of undifferentiated embryonic stem cells. As such, it is frequently used as a marker for undifferentiated cells. Oct-4 expression must be closely regulated; too much or too little will cause differentiation of the cells.

Octamer-binding transcription factor 4, OCT-4, is a transcription factor protein that is encoded by the POU5F1 gene and is part of the POU (Pit-Oct-Unc) family. OCT-4 regulates transcription by binding to an octamer motif, a particular sequence of 8 nucleotides in the promoter or enhancer of its target genes: ATGCAAAT. Expression of genes for which OCT-4 acts as a transcription activator leads to phenotypic changes in stem cell differentiation during the development of a mammalian embryo. It plays a vital role in determining the fates of both inner mass cells and embryonic stem cells and has the ability to maintain pluripotency throughout embryonic development. Recently, it has been noted that OCT-4 not only maintains pluripotency in embryonic cells but also has the ability to regulate cancer cell proliferation and can be found in various cancers such as pancreatic, lung, liver and testicular germ cell tumors in adult germ cells. Another defect this gene can have is dysplastic growth in epithelial tissues which are caused by a lack of OCT-4 within the epithelial cells.

== Expression and function ==
Oct-4 transcription factor is initially active as a maternal factor in the oocyte and remains active in embryos throughout the preimplantation period. Oct-4 expression is associated with an undifferentiated phenotype and tumors. Gene knockdown of Oct-4 promotes differentiation, demonstrating a role for these factors in human embryonic stem cell self-renewal. Oct-4 can form a heterodimer with Sox2, so that these two proteins bind DNA together.

Mouse embryos that are Oct-4 deficient or have low expression levels of Oct-4 fail to form the inner cell mass, lose pluripotency, and differentiate into trophectoderm. Therefore, the level of Oct-4 expression in mice is vital for regulating pluripotency and early cell differentiation since one of its main functions is to keep the embryo from differentiating.

== Orthologs ==
Orthologs of Oct-4 in humans and other species include:

Species	Entrez GeneID	Chromosome	Location	RefSeq (mRNA)	RefSeq (protein)
Mus musculus (mouse)	18999	17,17 B1; 17 19.23 cM	NC_000083.4, 35114104..35118822 (Plus Strand)	NM_013633.1	NP_038661.1
Homo sapiens (human)	5460	6, 6p21.31	NC_000006.10, 31246432-31240107 (Minus Strand)	NM_002701.3	NP_002692.2 (full length isoform); NP_002692.1 (N-terminal truncated isoform)
Rattus norvegicus (rat)	294562	20	NW_001084776, 650467-655015 (Minus strand)	NM_001009178	NP_001009178
Danio rerio (zebrafish)	303333	21	NC_007127.1, 27995548-28000317 (Minus strand)	NM_131112	NP_571187

== Structure ==
Oct-4 contains the following protein domains:

Domain	Description	Length (AA)
POU domain	Found in Pit-Oct-Unc transcription factors, also called POU_{S} (POU-specific) DNA-binding domain.	75
Homeodomain	DNA binding domains involved in the transcriptional regulation of key eukaryotic developmental processes; may bind to DNA as monomers or as homodimers and/or heterodimers in a sequence-specific manner. Also called POU_{H} (POU-type homeobox) DNA-binding domain.	59

== Implications in disease ==
Oct-4 has been implicated in tumorigenesis of adult germ cells. Ectopic expression of the factor in adult mice has been found to cause the formation of dysplastic lesions of the skin and intestine. The intestinal dysplasia resulted from an increase in progenitor cell population and the upregulation of β-catenin transcription through the inhibition of cellular differentiation.

== Pluripotency in embryo development ==
=== Animal model ===
In 2000, Niwa et al. used conditional expression and repression in murine embryonic stem cells to determine requirements for Oct-4 in the maintenance of developmental potency. Although transcriptional determination has often been considered as a binary on-off control system, they found that the precise level of Oct-4 governs 3 distinct fates of ES cells. An increase in expression of less than 2-fold causes differentiation into primitive endoderm and mesoderm. In contrast, repression of Oct-4 induces loss of pluripotency and dedifferentiation to trophectoderm. Thus, a critical amount of Oct-4 is required to sustain stem cell self-renewal, and up- or down-regulation induces divergent developmental programs. Changes to Oct-4 levels do not independently promote differentiation, but are also controlled by levels of Sox2. A decrease in Sox2 accompanies increased levels of Oct-4 to promote a mesendodermal fate, with Oct-4 actively inhibiting ectodermal differentiation. Repressed Oct-4 levels that lead to ectodermal differentiation are accompanied by an increase in Sox2, which effectively inhibits mesendodermal differentiation. Niwa et al. suggested that their findings established a role for Oct-4 as a master regulator of pluripotency that controls lineage commitment and illustrated the sophistication of critical transcriptional regulators and the consequent importance of quantitative analyzes.

The transcription factors Oct-4, Sox2, and Nanog are part of a complex regulatory network, with Oct-4 and Sox2 being capable of directly regulating Nanog by binding to its promoter, and are essential for maintaining the self-renewing undifferentiated state of the inner cell mass of the blastocyst, embryonic stem cell lines (which are cell lines derived from the inner cell mass), and induced pluripotent stem cells. While differential up- and down-regulation of Oct-4 and Sox2 has been shown to promote differentiation, down-regulation of Nanog must occur for differentiation to proceed.

==== Torso length ====
There is great variation among vertebrates in torso length, with snakes being an extreme case with many more spinal segments than other vertebrates. This difference is partially explained by the prolonged expression of Oct4 in snake embryos compared to mouse embryos. Mouse embryos that have received an extra, transgenic dose of Oct4 also show lengthening of their torso.

== Role in reprogramming ==
Oct-4 is one of the transcription factors that is used to create induced pluripotent stem cells (iPSCs), together with Sox2, Klf4, and often c-Myc (OSKM) in mice, demonstrating its capacity to induce an embryonic stem-cell-like state. These factors are often referred to as "Yamanaka reprogramming factors". This reprogramming effect has also been seen with the Thomson reprogramming factors, reverting human fibroblast cells to iPSCs via Oct-4, along with Sox2, Nanog, and Lin28. The use of Thomson reprogramming factors avoids the need to overexpress c-Myc, an oncogene. It was determined in 2008 that only two of these four factors, namely Oct4 and Klf4, are sufficient to reprogram mouse adult neural stem cells. It was then shown in 2009 that a single factor, Oct-4 was sufficient for this transformation. Moreover, while Sox2, Klf4, and cMyc could be replaced by their respective family members, Oct4's closer relatives, Oct1 and Oct6, fail to induce pluripotency, thus demonstrating the exclusiveness of Oct4 among POU transcription factors.

However, it was shown in 2019 that Oct4 could be completely omitted from the Yamanaka cocktail, and the remaining three factors, Sox2, Klf4, and cMyc (SKM) could generate mouse iPSCs with dramatically enhanced developmental potential. (The endogenous Oct4 gene is activated by this cocktail.) This suggests that Oct4 increases the efficiency of reprogramming, but decreases the quality of resulting iPSCs. This is due to Oct4 transiently promoting some incorrect gene expression programs.

The unique ability of Oct4 to induce pluripotency among POU transcription factors requires the following features:

- Three amino acids in DNA-binding domains (K7, T22, S151) that ensure interaction with Sox2. Also found in Oct1, but not Oct6. S151 (as opposed to the M in Oct6) in POU_{H} causes preferential binding to SoxOct elements over OctOct elements. The other two in POU_{S} are on the Oct-Sox interaction interface.
- A Cys48 residue in the POU_{S} DBD that allows it to be easily "turned off" by oxidation. Also found in Oct6, but not Oct1. More specifically, the Cys48 residue renders the DBD more sensitive to oxidative inhibition of DNA-binding activity and oxidative promotion of ubiquitylation (which leads to degradation). When the Cys48 is swapped to a serine, the resulting Oct4^{C48S} produces embryonic stem cells that poorly differentiate. iPSC reprogramming efficiency (in the Yamanaka setup) also drops by 59%.
- The part that is N-terminal to the POU_{S} (4N). Incorporating Cys48 into Oct1 is insufficient to cause reprogramming; splicing in the N-terminal segment from Oct4 is required for significant activity (55.2% relative to Oct4 in the Yamanaka cocktail). 4N without Cys48 resulted in 7.8% activity.
- The "linker" between POU_{S} and POU_{H} (4L). Incorporating 4N, 4L, and Cys48 into Oct1 resulted in 109% efficiency relative to Oct4.

The discovery of Cys48 suggests that future reprogramming efforts may be able to combine the efficiency of the original Yamanaka protocol and the quality of Oct4-less protocols by temporarily shutting down Oct4 using oxidation to prevent incorrect programs from being activated.

== In embryonic stem cells ==
- In in vitro experiments of mouse embryonic stem cells, Oct-4 has often been used as a marker of stemness, as differentiated cells show reduced expression of this marker.
- Oct3/4 can both repress and activate the promoter of Rex1. In cells that already express high level of Oct3/4, exogenously transfected Oct3/4 will lead to the repression of Rex1. However, in cells that are not actively expressing Oct3/4, exogenous transfection of Oct3/4 will lead to the activation of Rex1. This implies a dual regulatory ability of Oct3/4 on Rex1. At low levels of the Oct3/4 protein, the Rex1 promoter is activated, while at high levels of the Oct3/4 protein, the Rex1 promoter is repressed.
- Oct4 contributes to the rapid cell cycle of ESCs by promoting progression through the G1 phase, specifically through transcriptional inhibition of cyclin-dependent kinase inhibitors such as p21.
- CRISPR-Cas9 knockout of the gene in human embryonic stem cells demonstrated that Oct-4 is essential for the development after fertilisation.
- Oct3/4 represses Suv39h1 expression through the activation of an antisense long non-coding RNA. Suv39h1 inhibition maintains low level of H3K9me3 in pluripotent cells limiting the formation of heterochromatin.

== In adult stem cells ==
Several studies suggest a role for Oct-4 in sustaining self-renewal capacity of adult somatic stem cells (i.e. stem cells from epithelium, bone marrow, liver, etc.). Other scientists have produced evidence to the contrary, and dismiss those studies as artifacts of in vitro culture, or interpreting background noise as signal, and warn about Oct-4 pseudogenes giving false detection of Oct-4 expression. Oct-4 has also been implicated as a marker of cancer stem cells. A majority of Oct4 cancer stem-like cell studies (CSC) report a positive association between expression of OCT4 and chemoresistance. Chemotherapy resulting in the enrichment of CSCs showed changes in the phenotypes and increased stem cell markers of OCT4. Various cancers such as lung cancer, bladder cancer, and mesothelioma cells with high OCT4 expressions showed resistance to cisplatin, general drug resistance, and tumor recurrence. Breast cancer patients had tamoxifen resistance and poor clinical outcomes associated with OCT4. OCT4 knock-downs increase sensitivity to cisplatin and irradiation in lung cells, retained tumorigenicity in glioma-initiating cells, and metastasis mediation in ovarian cancer. In in vitro studies looking at cisplatin, knock-down of OCT4 increased their sensitivity and reduced cell proliferation. Further investigation is needed due to the sparsity of stem cells within tumors and their heterogeneity.

== See also ==
- Enhancer
- Histone
- Pribnow box
- RNA polymerase
- Gene regulatory network
