= Cell potency =

Ability of a cell to differentiate into other cell types

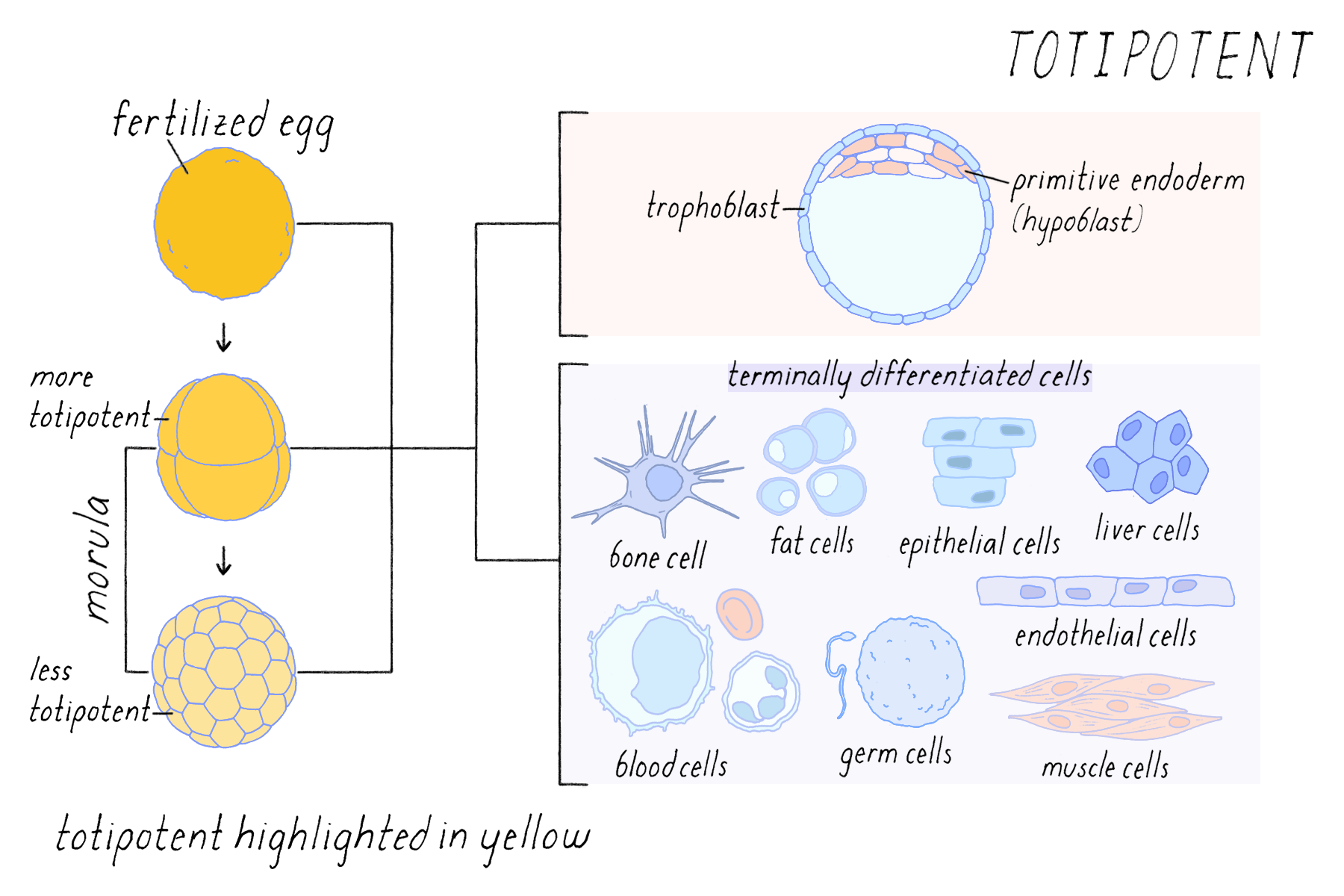
A totipotent stem cell can become any type of cell in the body as well as the placenta

Cell potency is a cell's ability to differentiate into other cell types. The more cell types a cell can differentiate into, the greater its potency. Potency is also described as the gene activation potential within a cell, which like a continuum, begins with totipotency to designate a cell with the most differentiation potential, pluripotency, multipotency, oligopotency, and finally unipotency.

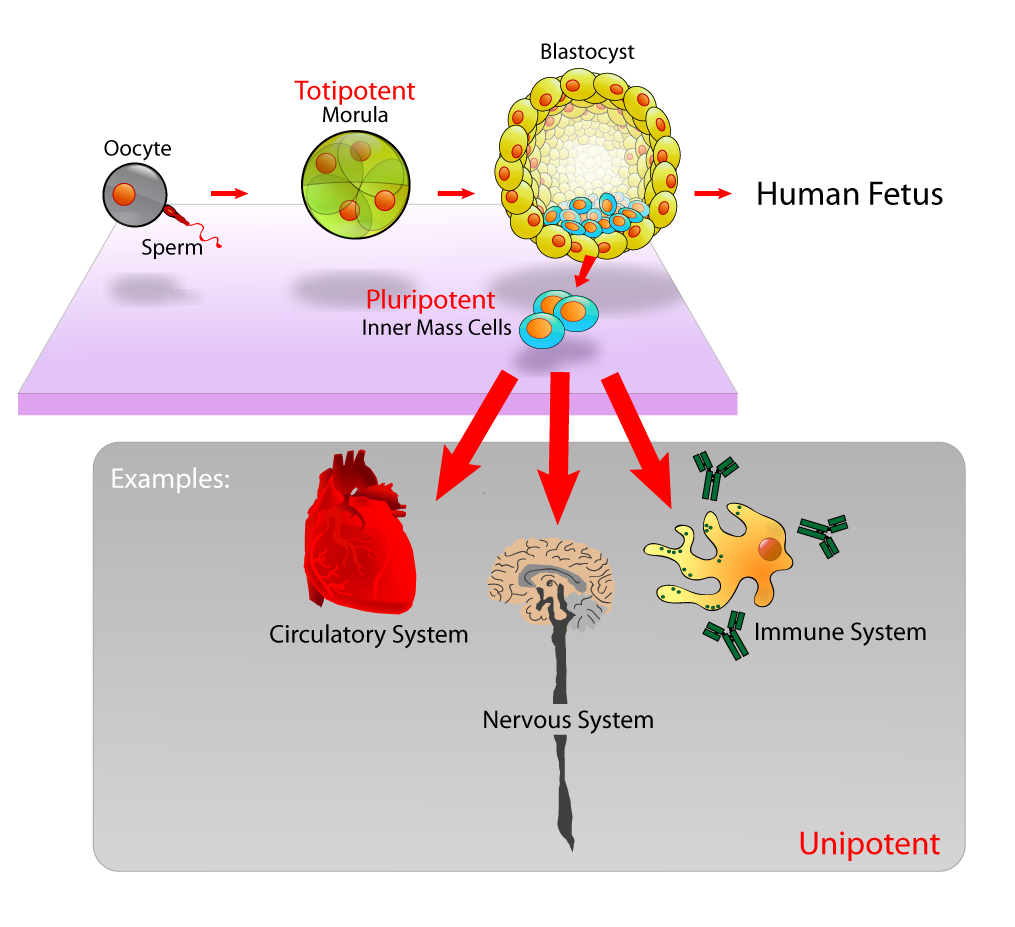
Pluripotent, embryonic stem cells originate as inner mass cells within a blastocyst. These stem cells can become any tissue in the body, excluding a placenta. Only the morula's cells are totipotent, able to become all tissues and a placenta.

== Totipotency ==
Totipotency (Latin: totipotentia, lit. 'ability for all [things]') is the ability of a single cell to divide and produce all of the differentiated cells in an organism. Spores and zygotes are examples of totipotent cells. In the spectrum of cell potency, totipotency represents the cell with the greatest differentiation potential, being able to differentiate into any embryonic cell, as well as any extraembryonic tissue cell. In contrast, pluripotent cells can only differentiate into embryonic cells.

A fully differentiated cell can return to a state of totipotency. The conversion to totipotency is complex and not fully understood. In 2011, research revealed that cells may differentiate not into a fully totipotent cell, but instead into a "complex cellular variation" of totipotency.

The human development model can be used to describe how totipotent cells arise. Human development begins when a sperm fertilizes an egg, and the resulting fertilized egg creates a single totipotent cell, a zygote. In the first hours after fertilization, this zygote divides into identical totipotent cells, which can later develop into any of the three germ layers of a human (endoderm, mesoderm, or ectoderm), or into cells of the placenta (cytotrophoblast or syncytiotrophoblast). After reaching a 16-cell stage, the totipotent cells of the morula differentiate into cells that will eventually become either the blastocyst's inner cell mass or the outer trophoblasts. Approximately four days after fertilization, and after several cycles of cell division, these totipotent cells begin to specialize. The inner cell mass, the source of embryonic stem cells, becomes pluripotent.

Research on Caenorhabditis elegans suggests that multiple mechanisms, including RNA regulation, may play a role in maintaining totipotency at different stages of development in some species. Work with zebrafish and mammals suggest a further interplay between miRNA and RNA-binding proteins (RBPs) in determining development differences.

=== Primordial germ cells ===
In mouse primordial germ cells, genome-wide reprogramming leading to totipotency involves erasure of epigenetic imprints. Reprogramming is facilitated by active DNA demethylation involving the DNA base excision repair enzymatic pathway. This pathway entails erasure of CpG methylation (5mC) in primordial germ cells via the initial conversion of 5mC to 5-hydroxymethylcytosine (5hmC), a reaction driven by high levels of the ten-eleven dioxygenase enzymes TET-1 and TET-2.

== Pluripotency ==
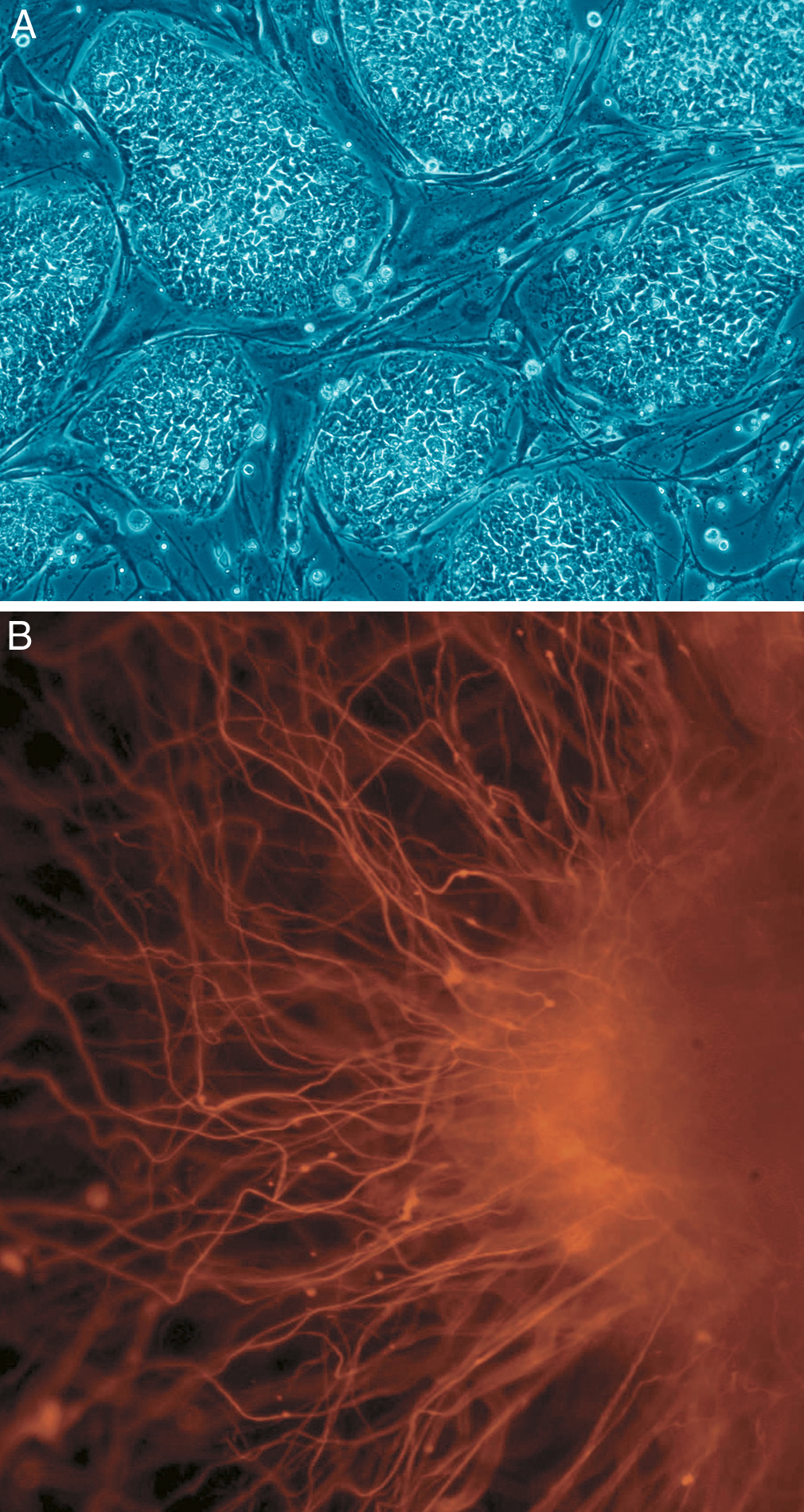
A: Human embryonic stem cells (cell colonies that are not yet differentiated) B: Nerve cells

A pluripotent stem cell (Latin: pluripotentia, lit. 'ability for many [things]') is a stem cell that has the potential to differentiate into any of the cells of the three germ layers: endoderm (gut, lungs and liver), mesoderm (muscle, skeleton, blood vascular, urogenital, dermis), or ectoderm (nervous, sensory, epidermis), but not into extra-embryonic tissues like the placenta or yolk sac.

=== Induced pluripotency ===
Induced pluripotent stem cells, commonly abbreviated as iPS cells or iPSCs, are a type of pluripotent stem cell artificially derived from a non-pluripotent cell, typically an adult somatic cell, by inducing a "forced" expression of certain genes and transcription factors. These transcription factors play a key role in determining the state of these cells and also highlights the fact that these somatic cells do preserve the same genetic information as early embryonic cells. The ability to induce cells into a pluripotent state was initially pioneered in 2006 using mouse fibroblasts and four transcription factors, Oct4, Sox2, Klf4 and c-Myc; this technique, called reprogramming, later earned Shinya Yamanaka and John Gurdon the Nobel Prize in Physiology or Medicine. This was then followed in 2007 by the successful induction of human iPSCs derived from human dermal fibroblasts using methods similar to those used for the induction of mouse cells. These induced cells exhibit similar traits to those of embryonic stem cells (ESCs) but do not require the use of embryos. Some of the similarities between ESCs and iPSCs include pluripotency, morphology, self-renewal ability, a trait that implies that they can divide and replicate indefinitely, and gene expression.

Epigenetic factors are also thought to be involved in the actual reprogramming of somatic cells in order to induce pluripotency. It has been theorized that certain epigenetic factors might actually work to clear the original somatic epigenetic marks in order to acquire the new epigenetic marks that are part of achieving a pluripotent state. Chromatin is also reorganized in iPSCs and becomes like that found in ESCs in that it is less condensed and therefore more accessible. Euchromatin modifications are also common which is also consistent with the state of euchromatin found in ESCs.

Due to their great similarity to ESCs, the medical and research communities are interested in iPSCs. iPSCs could potentially have the same therapeutic implications and applications as ESCs but without the controversial use of embryos in the process, a topic of great bioethical debate. The induced pluripotency of somatic cells into undifferentiated iPS cells was originally hailed as the end of the controversial use of embryonic stem cells. However, iPSCs were found to be potentially tumorigenic, and, despite advances, were never approved for clinical stage research in the United States until recently. Currently, autologous iPSC-derived dopaminergic progenitor cells are used in trials for treating Parkinson's disease. Setbacks such as low replication rates and early senescence have also been encountered when making iPSCs, hindering their use as ESCs replacements.

Somatic expression of combined transcription factors can directly induce other defined somatic cell fates (transdifferentiation); researchers identified three neural-lineage-specific transcription factors that could directly convert mouse fibroblasts (connective tissue cells) into fully functional neurons. This result challenges the terminal nature of cellular differentiation and the integrity of lineage commitment; and implies that with the proper tools, all cells are totipotent and may form all kinds of tissue.

Some of the possible medical and therapeutic uses for iPSCs derived from patients include their use in cell and tissue transplants without the risk of rejection that is commonly encountered. iPSCs can potentially replace animal models unsuitable as well as in vitro models used for disease research.

==== Teratoma formation assays ====
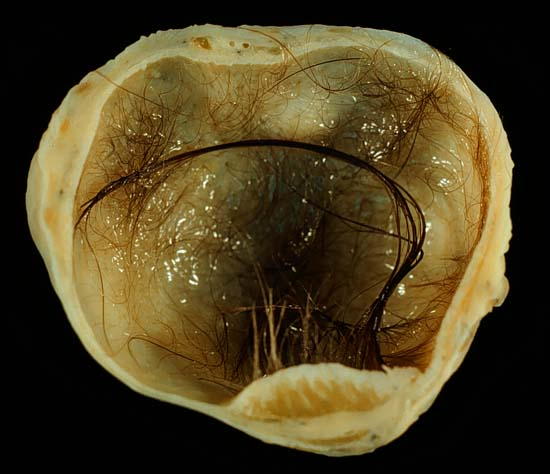
Cystic ovary teratoma

As the continued research and application of ESCs and iPSCs expands in regenerative medicine models, quality checks of test cells are needed. A widely accepted procedure that works for both mammalian ESCs and iPSCs is the teratoma formation assay. A teratoma is a benign (typically) tumor that is characterized by its ability to form the three germ layers: ectoderm (nerves, epithelium), mesoderm (muscle, bone, and cartilage), and endoderm (gut).

A teratoma formation assay is done by injecting test cells that are expected pluripotent cells into various tissues. A few areas include but are not limited to: the kidney capsule, intra-testicular, and intramuscular regions of mice that are immune-deficient. Determined pluripotency is characterized by the test cell's ability to form a teratoma that is capable of producing the three distinct germ layers.

While the teratoma formation assay is considered the "gold standard" among researchers, many issues have arisen with the test. One particular issue is the lack of standardization regarding specific details and factors that influence teratoma formation. Areas of concern for standardization are graft sites, age of test organism (typically mice), and the number of cells being injected into the test organism. These assays are also costly and operationally burdensome, and ethical concerns are an issue due to the use of test organisms.

Another issue with this type of testing is the possibility of histological reading errors. Cells that are not completely reprogrammed into iPSCs that form noticeable cell masses, which look similar characteristically to teratomas, may be judged as pluripotent while lacking the three germ layers. The need for tracking of cell lineages and host versus donor cell markings has also been noted. Certain cell preparation materials may induce an inflammatory response or a foreign antigen immune response. These responses may play a role in falsely identifying differentiation of the test cells.

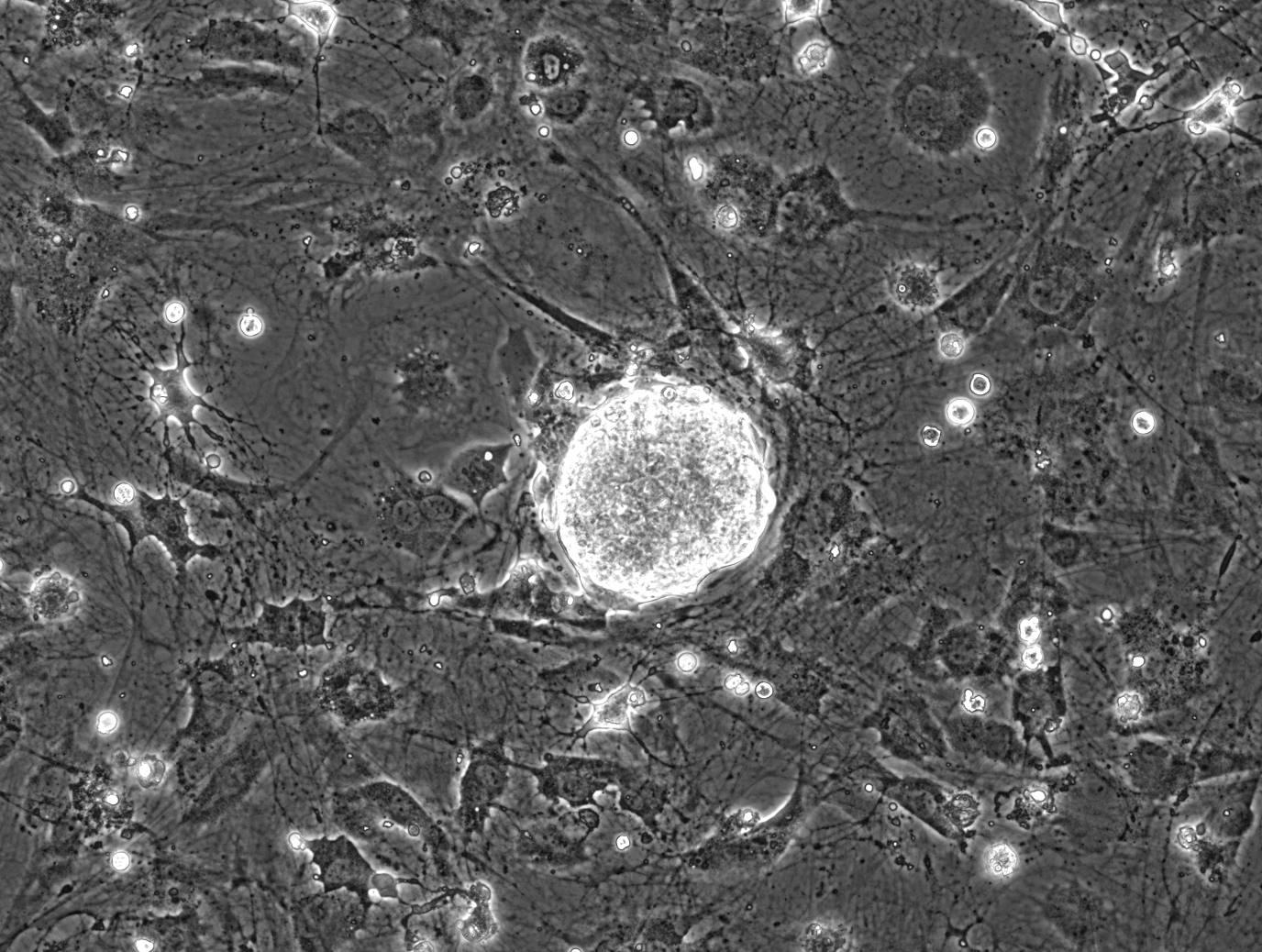
Naive human pluripotent stem cell colony here seen growing on feeder cells (mouse)

=== Naive vs. primed pluripotency states ===
Findings with respect to epiblasts before and after implantation have produced proposals for classifying pluripotency into two states: "naive" and "primed", representing pre- and post-implantation epiblast, respectively. Naive-to-primed continuum is controlled by reduction of Sox2/Oct4 dimerization on SoxOct DNA elements controlling naive pluripotency. Primed pluripotent stem cells from different species could be reset to naive state using a cocktail containing Klf4 and Sox2 or "super-Sox" − a chimeric transcription factor with enhanced capacity to dimerize with Oct4.

The baseline stem cells commonly used in science that are referred as embryonic stem cells (ESCs) are derived from a pre-implantation epiblast; such epiblast is able to generate the entire fetus, and one epiblast cell is able to contribute to all cell lineages if injected into another blastocyst. On the other hand, several marked differences can be observed between the pre- and post-implantation epiblasts, such as their difference in morphology, in which the epiblast after implantation changes its morphology into a cup-like shape called the "egg cylinder" as well as chromosomal alteration in which one of the X-chromosomes under random inactivation in the early stage of the egg cylinder, known as X-inactivation. During this development, the egg cylinder epiblast cells are systematically targeted by Fibroblast growth factors, Wnt signaling, and other inductive factors via the surrounding yolk sac and the trophoblast tissue, such that they become instructively specific according to the spatial organization.

Another major difference is that post-implantation epiblast stem cells are unable to contribute to blastocyst chimeras, which distinguishes them from other known pluripotent stem cells. Cell lines derived from such post-implantation epiblasts are referred to as epiblast-derived stem cells, which were first derived in laboratory in 2007. Both ESCs and EpiSCs are derived from epiblasts but at difference phases of development. Pluripotency is still intact in the post-implantation epiblast, as demonstrated by the conserved expression of Nanog, Fut4, and Oct-4 in EpiSCs, until somitogenesis and can be reversed midway through induced expression of Oct-4.

=== Native pluripotency in plants ===
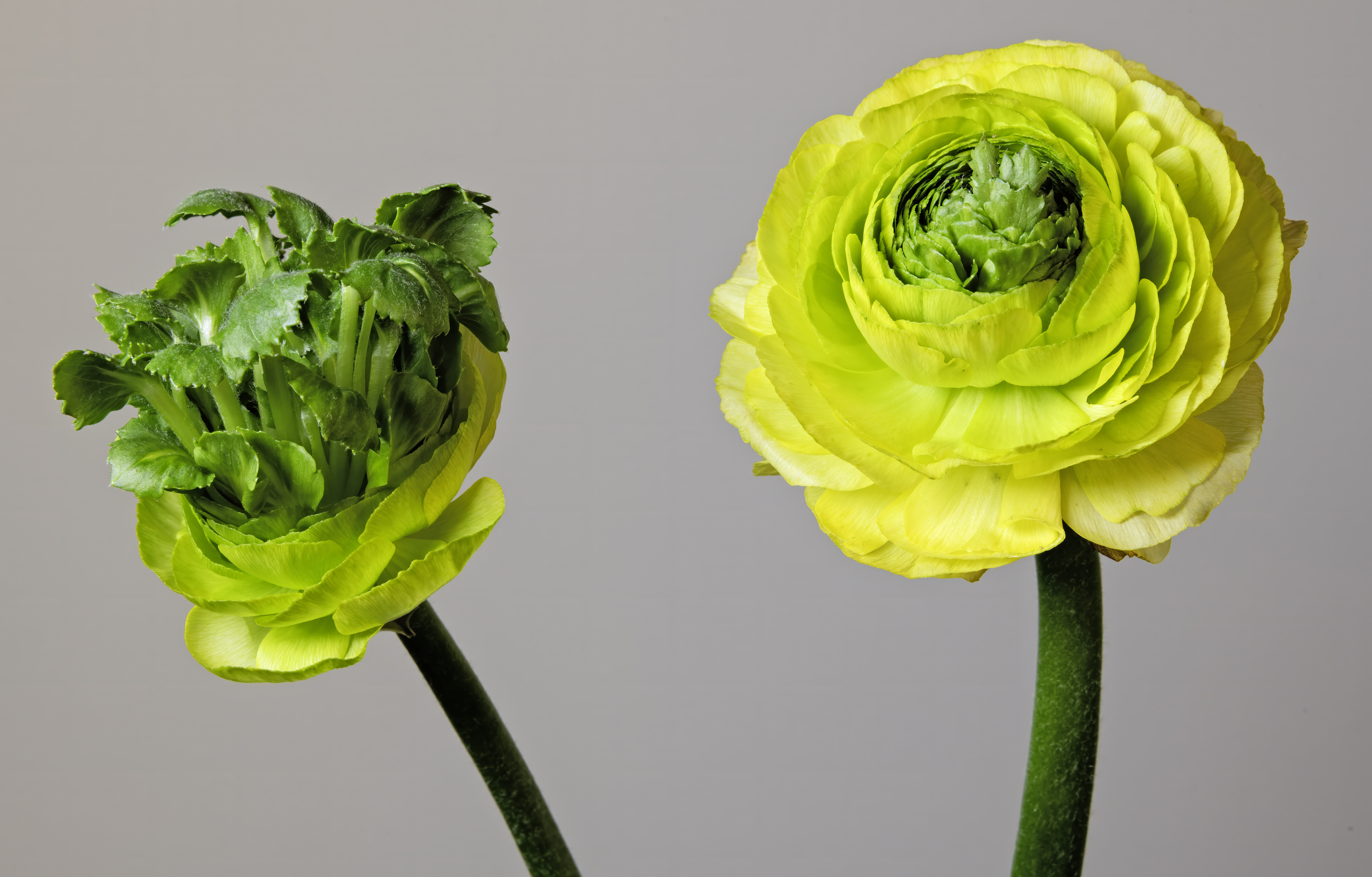
Ranunculus asiaticus example of totipotency of two individuals MHNT

Un-induced pluripotency has been observed in root meristem tissue culture, especially by Kareem et al 2015, Kim et al 2018, and Rosspopoff et al 2017. This pluripotency is regulated by various regulators, including PLETHORA 1 and PLETHORA 2; and PLETHORA 3, PLETHORA 5, and PLETHORA 7, whose expression were found by Kareem to be auxin-provoked. (These are also known as PLT1, PLT2, PLT3, PLT5, PLT7, and expressed by genes of the same names.) As of 2019, this is expected to open up future research into pluripotency in root tissues.

=== Maintenance of pluripotency state ===
The maintenance of the pluripotency state relies on a finely balanced network of transcription factors, signaling pathways, and epigenetic regulators that work together to preserve a cell’s capacity for unlimited self-renewal and its potential to differentiate into all cell types. Core transcription factors such as OCT4, SOX2, and NANOG form the central regulatory circuitry that sustains pluripotency by activating genes essential for self-renewal while repressing differentiation signals.

== Multipotency ==
Hematopoietic stem cells are an example of multipotency. When they differentiate into myeloid or lymphoid progenitor cells, they lose potency and become oligopotent cells with the ability to give rise to all cells of its lineage.

Multipotency is when progenitor cells have the gene activation potential to differentiate into discrete cell types. For example, a hematopoietic stem cell – and this cell type can differentiate itself into several types of blood cell like lymphocytes, monocytes, neutrophils, etc., but it is still ambiguous whether HSC possess the ability to differentiate into brain cells, bone cells or other non-blood cell types.

Research related to multipotent cells suggests that multipotent cells may be capable of conversion into unrelated cell types. In another case, human umbilical cord blood stem cells were converted into human neurons. There is also research on converting multipotent cells into pluripotent cells.

Multipotent cells are found in many, but not all human cell types. Multipotent cells have been found in cord blood, adipose tissue, cardiac cells, bone marrow, and mesenchymal stem cells (MSCs) which are found in the third molar.

MSCs may prove to be a valuable source for stem cells from molars at 8–10 years of age, before adult dental calcification. MSCs can differentiate into osteoblasts, chondrocytes, and adipocytes.

== Oligopotency ==
In biology, oligopotency is the ability of progenitor cells to differentiate into a few cell types. It is a degree of potency. Examples of oligopotent stem cells are the lymphoid or myeloid stem cells. A lymphoid cell specifically, can give rise to various blood cells such as B and T cells, however, not to a different blood cell type like a red blood cell. Examples of progenitor cells are vascular stem cells that have the capacity to become both endothelial or smooth muscle cells.

== Unipotency ==
A unipotent cell is a stem cell that has the capacity to differentiate into only one cell type. Unlike pluripotent or multipotent stem cells, which can become many different kinds of cells, unipotent cells can only produce a single mature cell type. Despite this limited differentiation potential, they often have the ability to self-renew, which means they can make more copies of themselves. Unipotent cells are often referred to as precursor cells.

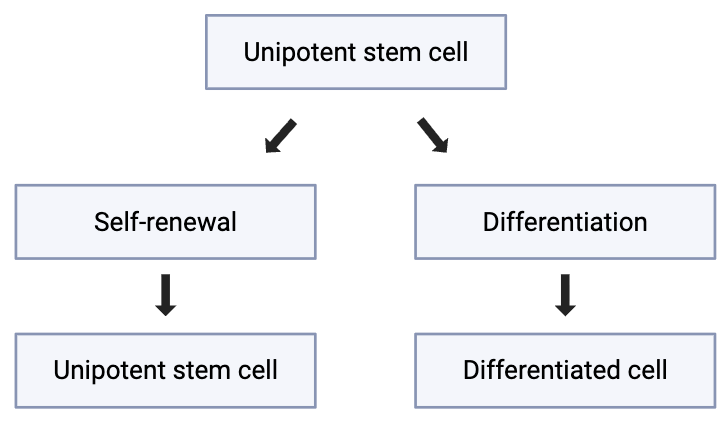
Unipotent stem cell diagram

However, the classification of truly unipotent stem cells remains a subject of scientific discussion. Some cells previously labeled as unipotent may instead be progenitor cells. Progenitor cells are cells that are already committed to a specific developmental pathway and do not have a long-term self-renewal ability. This distinction is important because true stem cells must be able to both differentiate and maintain their population over time. As a result, determination of a true unipotent cell can be challenging.

For example, hepatoblasts were once thought to be unipotent. Instead, they are bipotent because they can differentiate into hepatocytes or cholangiocytes. This example highlights how advances in experimental evidence can refine how cell types are classified.

== Nullipotency ==
In cell biology, a nullipotent cell is one that does not have a capacity to differentiate into any other cell type (Latin: nullipotentia, lit. 'ability for nothing'). While the term can be used to describe terminally differentiated cells (such as neurons, red blood cells, etc.) it is most commonly used when referring to embryonal carcinoma (EC) or embryonic stem cells that have lost their differentiation ability (usually due to genetic mutations).

== See also ==
- Induced stem cells
