= Vacanti =

Vacanti may refer to:

== People ==
- Charles Vacanti (born 1950), American researcher
- Joseph P. Vacanti (born 1948), American surgeon and researcher
- Sam Vacanti (1922–1981), American football footballer

== Other uses ==
- Vacanti mouse, laboratory mouse
