= Spore-like cell =

Spore-like cells were proposed to be pluripotent cells that lie dormant in animal tissue and become active under stress or injury as adult stem cells, exhibiting behavior characteristic of spores. They were proposed in 2001 by brothers Charles and Martin Vacanti and colleagues. Further work in collaboration with Japanese researchers led to the apparent discovery of STAP cells, in which the pluripotent cells were newly created by stress or injury. This work was published in 2014, but soon found to be due to fraudulent work by Haruko Obokata.

== Characteristics ==
Spore-like cells were said to be a specific class of stem cells in adult organisms, including humans, which are small, versatile, and most frequently remain in a dormant "spore-like" state as the rest of the cells of the organism divide, grow, and die. Despite their dormancy, they apparently retain the ability to grow, divide, and differentiate into other cell types expressing characteristics appropriate to the tissue environment from which they were initially isolated, if some external stimulus should prompt them to do so. This capacity to continue to regenerate new cells has been shown in in vitro conditions for some animals in which all other cells have died, especially if the animal died from exposure to cold elements.

Spore-like cells were said to remain viable in unprepared tissue (using no special preservation techniques), frozen at -86 °C and then thawed, or heated to 85 °C for more than 30 minutes. This has led researchers to try to revitalize spore-like cells from tissue samples of frozen carcasses deposited in permafrost for decades (frozen walrus meat more than 100 years old, and mammoth and bison in Alaska estimated to be 50,000 years old). Vacanti et al. believed that these unique cells lie dormant until activated by injury or disease, and that they have the potential to regenerate tissues lost to disease or damage. Because the cell-size of less than 5 micrometers seems rather small as to contain the entire human genome the authors speculate on the "concept of a minimal genome" for these cells.

== Later work ==
Charles Vacanti continued to work on these cells when he moved to Harvard, including with thoracic surgeon Koji Kojima who identified them in lung tissue. Working with a graduate student Haruko Obokata in his lab at Harvard from 2008, Vacanti later refined this theory to suggest that stress or injury could actually trigger the development of pluripotency in somatic cells. He first proposed this to Obokata and Masayuki Yamato at a conference in Florida in 2010; Yamato had independently come to the same conclusion. Obokata returned to Japan and continued this work at RIKEN. Vacanti presented these results in July 2012 at the Society of Cardiovascular Anesthesiologists conference, and then in January 2014 the journal Nature published two articles suggesting that a simple acid treatment could cause mouse blood cells to become pluripotent. The Boston Globe reported that "His discovery is a reminder that as specialized as science is, sometimes, a little ignorance may be a virtue. A stem-cell expert would probably never have even bothered to try the experiment Vacanti has been pursuing, on and off, since the late 1990s." Both STAP articles were retracted in July 2014 after an investigation by RIKEN concluded that the data were fabricated.

Researcher Mariusz Ratajczak has linked spore-like cells to his idea of Very small embryonic-like stem cells, also proposed to be very small adult stem cells.

== See also ==
- Stem cell
- Adult stem cell
- Spore
