= Yamazaki-Teiichi Prize =

The Yamazaki-Teiichi Prize is an award given annually by the Foundation for Promotion of Material Science and Technology of Japan (MST) to people who have achieved outstanding, creative results with practical effects by publishing theses, acquiring patents, or developing methods, technologies, and the like, and to people with strong potential for achieving such results in the future. The chairman of the selection committee is Professor Hideki Shirakawa, winner of the 2000 Nobel Prize in Chemistry. The prize was established in commemoration of the late Teiichi Yamazaki, the first chairman of the MST's Board of Directors, for his contributions to scientific, technological, and industrial development and human resource cultivation.

== Fields ==
The Yamazaki-Teiichi Prize is awarded in the following four fields. Prizewinners receive an award diploma, a gold medal, and a cash award of JPY 3,000,000 (approximately US$30,000) per full prize in each area.

- Materials
- Semiconductors & semiconductor devices
- Measurement science & technology
- Biological science & technology

== Awards ==
=== Materials ===
- 2001 - Takaaki Toyooka. Next-generation electrical resistance-welded steel tube with high strength and excellent formability contributing to energy conservation.
- 2002 - Syunichi Miyazaki. Development of Ti-Ni shape-memory alloys and contribution to their applications.
- 2003 - Toshihiro Ishikawa. Development and industrialization of functional ceramics produced from an organosilicon polymer.
- 2004 - Hirohisa Tanaka, Mari Uenishi, Yasuo Nishihata. Research and development of a self-regenerative palladium-perovskite catalyst for automotive emissions control.
- 2005 - Terunobu Miyazaki. Study on the application of tunnel magnetoresistance junctions.
- 2006 - Kazuhito Hashimoto, Toshiya Watanabe. Environmental materials using TiO_{2} photocatalysts with solar energy.
- 2007 - Masashi Kawasaki. Exploration of ZnO-based semiconductor technology.
- 2008 - Terunori Fujita, Makoto Mitani. Development of new olefin polymerization catalysts and their applications to novel polyolefinic materials.
- 2009 - Tsuyoshi Masumoto, Hiroyasu Fujimori. Development and industrial contribution of amorphous alloys.
- 2010 - Satoshi Takechi, Koji Nozaki. Technical innovation in ArF resist material for LSI production in the 90 nm era and beyond.
- 2011 - Akira Yoshino. Development and commercialization of the lithium-ion battery.
- 2012 - Yoshinobu Honkura. Research and development of Dy-free Nd-Fe-B anisotropic bonded magnets and their applications to motors.
- 2013 - Hiroshi Harada, Kyoko Kawagishi, Tadaharu Yokokawa. Development of high-temperature turbine material using nickel-based superalloys.
- 2014 - Takatomo Sasaki, Yusuke Mori, Masashi Yoshimura. Discovery of the nonlinear optical borate crystal CsLiB_{6}O_{10} and contributions to the development of new deep-ultraviolet laser sources.
- 2015 - Fujimitsu Masuyama, Atsuro Iseda. Contribution to the development and application of creep-strength-enhanced ferritic heat-resistant steels and highly efficient power plant operation.
- 2016 - Akira Yoshikawa, Kei Kamada, Yasuhiro Shoji. Development of novel garnet scintillators and industrialization by academic startups.

=== Semiconductors & semiconductor devices ===
- 2001 - Hiroyuki Matsunami. Pioneering work in high-quality epitaxial growth of semiconductor silicon carbide and power devices.
- 2002 - Tatau Nishinaga. Invention of microchannel epitaxy for the drastic reduction of dislocations in highly lattice-mismatched heteroepitaxial systems.
- 2003 - Jyunichi Murota. Development of group IV hetero CVD technology and creation of atomically controlled processing.
- 2004 - Kazutoshi Wakabayashi. High-level synthesis and verification of system LSI.
- 2005 - Mitsuo Usami, Ryo Imura. Development of an ultra-small chip for IC tags and related technology.
- 2006 - Takashi Ito. Advanced research on highly reliable CMOS gate dielectric films by direct nitridation of silicon.
- 2007 - Hiroshi Iwai, Hisayo S. Momose, Tatsuya Ohguro. Pioneering work in sub-50 nm MOSFET research and development.
- 2008 - Masaru Sasago. Pioneering research and industrial development of excimer laser lithography technology.
- 2009 - Yoshinobu Nakagome, Masashi Horiguchi, Takayuki Kawahara. Pioneering development of low-leakage CMOS circuits.
- 2010 - Hiroo Kinoshita. Pioneering research and longstanding contribution to the industrial development of extreme ultraviolet lithography.
- 2011 - Digh Hisamoto. Invention and development of "fin" structure MOSFETs.
- 2012 - Shinichi Takagi. Pioneering contributions to understanding carrier transport properties in the channels of Si MOSFETs and to technology for channel mobility enhancement.
- 2013 - Nobukazu Teranishi. Development of image sensors with pinned photodiodes.
- 2014 - Takashi Eshita, Shoichiro Kawashima, Shigeo Kashiwagi. Development of high-reliability technologies for ferroelectric random-access memory and its mass production.
- 2015 - Hidefumi Ibe, Tadanobu Toba, Kenichi Shinbo. Development of impact assessment technologies for terrestrial neutron-induced soft errors in semiconductor devices and prompt protection architecture against resultant failures in electronic systems.
- 2016 - Mitsuru Sugawara, Keizo Takemasa, Kenichi Nishi. Realization of superior-characteristic quantum dot lasers with optical communication wavelength and their commercialization through mass production.

=== Measurement science & technology ===
- 2001 - Mitsuhiro Katayama. Development of coaxial impact-collision ion scattering spectroscopy and its application to in situ topmost surface analysis.
- 2002 - Kaneo Mouri. Development of a highly sensitive micromagnetic sensor using amorphous wire: magneto-impedance sensor.
- 2003 - Masashi Iwatsuki. Development of variable-temperature SPM (scanning probe microscope).
- 2004 - Reiko Kuroda. Development and application of a universal chiroptical spectrophotometer (UCS).
- 2005 - Kazuyuki Koike. Development and application of a spin-polarized scanning electron microscope.
- 2006 - Yuji Miyahara, Toshiya Sakata. Electrical detection of biomolecular recognition using a genetic field-effect transistor and its application to genetic analyses.
- 2007 - Takeshi Hasegawa. Development of multiple-angle incidence resolution spectrometry and its application to the analysis of molecular structure in ultrathin films.
- 2008 - Kazushi Yamanaka. Development of a ball surface acoustic wave sensor (ball SAW sensor).
- 2009 - Yasuaki Takada, Masuyoshi Yamada, Yuichiro Hashimoto. Real-time mass spectrometry for a secure society.
- 2010 - Toshio Ando. Development of a high-speed atomic force microscope and its application to dynamic observation of biomolecules.
- 2011 - Tutomu Nakanishi, Yoshikazu Takeda, Takanori Koshikawa. Development and application of a spin-polarized low-energy electron microscope for dynamic observation of magnetic domains.
- 2012 - Michio Tajima. Development and standardization of a semiconductor characterization technique using photoluminescence.
- 2013 - Hiroyuki Fujita, Hiroyuki Noji, Gen Hashiguchi. Development of micromachine technology for bionano characterization.
- 2014 - Tsutomu Masujima. Development of nanomass spectrometry for a live single cell and organelle and its application to drug discovery and biomedical sciences.
- 2015 - Hideyuki Takahashi, Masami Terauchi, Masato Koike. Development of a soft x-ray spectrometer dedicated to electron microbeam analysis for versatile practical applications.
- 2017 - Kiyoshi Toko.

=== Biological science & technology ===
- 2001 - Kazuhiko Kinoshita. Development of technology for the direct observation of dynamic motion of a single living molecule.
- 2002 - Tetsuo Nagano. Development of novel and practical bioimaging probes.
- 2003 - Yaeta Endo. Establishment of a cell-free protein synthesis system for practical use.
- 2004 - Atushi Miyawaki. Multidisciplinary innovations in fluorescence imaging.
- 2005 - Yoshinori Fujiyoshi. Structural and functional studies of membrane proteins.
- 2006 - Keiko Shimamoto. Study of the excitatory neurotransmission system based on novel molecular probes.
- 2007 - Piero Carninci. Development of the cap-trapper, a fundamental technology for isolating full-length cDNAs and annotating genome functions.
- 2008 - Shinya Yamanaka. Identification of factors that induce and maintain pluripotency.
- 2009 - Teruo Okano, Akihiko Kikuchi, Masayuki Yamato. Creation of cell-sheet engineering based on intelligent surfaces.
- 2010 - Teruhiko Wakayama. Development of novel animal reproduction technology.
- 2011 - Chikashi Toyoshima. Development of a crystallization method utilizing phospholipids and elucidation of the mechanism of the calcium pump.
- 2012 - Yoshiki Sasai. Three-dimensional formation of brain and sensory tissues from pluripotent stem cells through self-organization.
- 2013 - Tadashi Miyasaka, Seigo Sawada, Teruo Yokokura. Irinotecan hydrochloride: the first established anticancer agent derived from camptothecin derivatives.
- 2014 - Hiroshi Nagase. Design and synthesis of opioid receptor-type selective ligands and their application to drugs.
- 2015 - Hiroki Ueda. Realization of whole-body analysis with single-cell resolution by whole-body clearing technology.

== Related news releases ==
- 2006: Suntory Institute for Bioorganic Research TOPICS: Keiko Shimamoto received the 6th Yamazaki-Teiichi Prize (in Japanese).
- 2007: Tokyo Institute of Technology–Prof. Hiroshi Iwai was awarded the Yamazaki-Teiichi Prize with Dr. Hisayo Momose and Mr. Tatsuya Ohguro of Toshiba Corporation. Album..
- 2007: RIKEN NEWS: Yamazaki-Teiichi Prizes awarded to two RIKEN scientists.
- 2008: Kyoto University–Center for iPS Cell Research and Application NEWS ROOM: Prof. Shinya Yamanaka recognized with Yamazaki-Teiichi Prize in press release (in Japanese).
- 2008: Tohoku University–New Industry Creation Hatchery Center NEWS: Professor Kazushi Yamanaka received the 8th Yamazaki-Teiichi Prize.
