= Linda Griffith =

American biological engineer

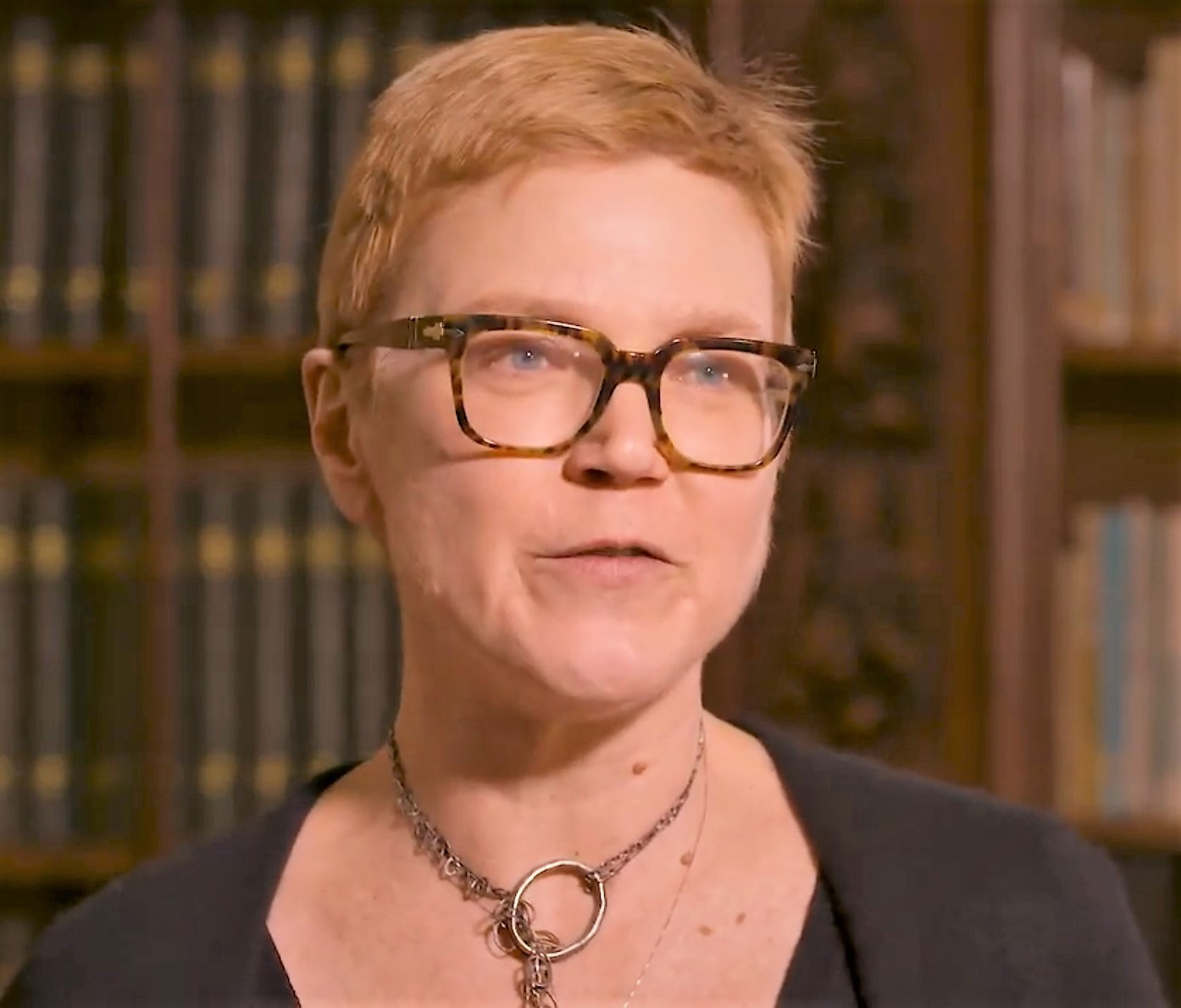
- Griffith in 2018
- Born: August 30, 1960; Atlanta, Georgia
- Education: Georgia Institute of Technology; University of California, Berkeley
- Spouse: Doug Lauffenburger
- Awards: MacArthur Fellowship
- Scientific career
- Fields: Biomedical Engineering
- Workplaces: Massachusetts Institute of Technology
- Website: lgglab.mit.edu

Linda Gay Griffith (born August 30, 1960 Atlanta, Georgia) is an American biological engineer, and Professor of Biological Engineering and Mechanical Engineering at Massachusetts Institute of Technology, where she also directs the Center for Gynepathology Research.

She is a 2006 recipient of a MacArthur Fellowship, commonly referred to as the "MacArthur genius award."

In 2011, Griffith was elected a member of the National Academy of Engineering for contributions to 3D functional biomaterials, engineered hepatic tissues, and cell transplant devices. In 2021, she was elected into the National Academy of Medicine for "long-standing leadership in research, education, and medical translation; for pioneering work in tissue engineering, biomaterials, and systems biology, including developing the first “liver chip” technology; inventing 3D biomaterials printing and organotypic models for systems gynopathology; and for the establishment of the MIT Biological Engineering Department."

== Life ==
She was raised in Decatur, Valdosta, and Roswell, Georgia. She graduated with a B.ChE. in 1982 from the Georgia Institute of Technology, where she was a writer and editor on the undergraduate newspaper, The Technique, in 1982, and was named a distinguished alumna of her alma mater's School of Engineering in 2006. She received a PhD in chemical engineering from the University of California, Berkeley in 1988. She joined the MIT faculty in 1991, was promoted to associate professor of chemical engineering in 1996, and to tenure in chemical engineering in 1998, the same year she joined the newly formed Division of Biological Engineering and Environmental Health at MIT. As an assistant professor, she joined a collaboration with Charles Vacanti, Joseph Vacanti, and Joseph Upton to create tissue engineered cartilage in the shape of a human ear (published under the surname used in her first marriage), known as the Vacanti mouse. The Griffith Lab at MIT currently focuses on molecular biomaterials and tissue engineering approaches for regenerative medicine, drug development and understanding disease pathophysiology.

In 1994, together with colleagues Roger D. Kamm and Alan Grodzinsky, she led development of MIT's first interdepartmental minor degree, in biomedical engineering, which was launched in 1995 and soon became MIT's most popular minor degree. The interdepartmental bioengineering curriculum committee she chaired grew into the Undergraduate Programs Committee for the Department of Biological Engineering, and as chair of this committee she led development of the undergraduate major in Biological Engineering, launched in 2005 as MIT's first new undergraduate major in 39 years. She stepped down as chair of this committee in 2009 to spend a fellowship year at the Radcliffe Institute for Advanced Study, sponsored by the Harvard Stem Cell Institute.

She currently holds the School of Engineering Teaching Innovation Chair in recognition of her contributions to curriculum development at MIT. Furthermore, she is the co-founder of CN Bio Innovations and serves on the advisory board of Lumicell. She is married to Doug Lauffenburger, also a professor at MIT.

== Women's health research ==
Griffith currently directs the Center for Gynepathology Research (CGR) at MIT, which she launched in 2009 together with Keith Isaacson, Director of the Newton-Wellesley Hospital Center for Minimally Invasive Gynecology Surgery. The public launch featured a passionate talk by the celebrity host of Bravo's Top Chef, Padma Lakshmi, who suffered for over a decade with endometriosis before being diagnosed. Lakshmi co-founded the Endometriosis Foundation of America (EFA) to raise awareness of the disease, especially among college students. Lakshmi's experience underscored that of Griffith's own 16-year-old niece, who was diagnosed with endometriosis after suffering years of debilitating pain, which had been attributed to "stress" instead of to a treatable disease. The average delay between onset of symptoms and diagnosis of endometriosis is about ten years; Griffith's niece was diagnosed with less delay only because a family member with the disease insisted she see a gynecological surgeon who specializes in treating endometriosis. The CGR now has over 10 participating faculty at MIT and collaborates with surgeons and scientists in Brazil, Singapore, and across the US. Griffith was honored at the EFA's annual Blossom Ball in NYC in 2010 for her efforts to raise awareness about endometriosis among scientists and engineers.

== Selected awards ==
- 1977 Georgia Governor's Honors Program (English)
- 1991 National Science Foundation Presidential Young Investigator Award
- 1998 Fellow, American Institute for Medical and Biological Engineering
- 1999 MIT Class of 1960 Innovation in Education Award
- 2002 Popular Science Brilliant 10
- 2006 MacArthur Fellows Program
- 2009 Clemson Award for Basic Research, Society of Biomaterials
- 2010 1st Ruth Kirschstein Memorial Lecture, NIH Office of Research on Women's Health
- 2010 Fellow, Biomedical Engineering Society
- 2011 Member, National Academy of Engineering
- 2021 Member, National Academy of Medicine
- 2024 Included in Time list of influential people in health.
