= Piero Carninci =

Italian geneticist

Piero Carninci is an Italian geneticist who graduated from the University of Trieste in 1989 and from 1990 to 1995 was an inventor of various DNA sequences and extractions. Later on he moved to Japan where he worked in RIKEN. He became principal investigator at Omics Science Center in 2008 at RIKEN, and subsequently Division Director at the RIKEN Center for Life Science Technologies. Currently he specializes CAGE, leads the FANTOM project, and is also a writer of over 300 scientific papers. In 2014, he won the Chen Award of Excellence. In 2016, he became a recipient of the Shimadzu Prize. From 2020 is Head of the Genomics Research Centre, Functional Genomics Programme, of Human Technopole.
