= Yuki Okoda =

Japanese astronomer

Yuki Okoda (Japanese: 大小田 結貴, born 1994 in Kure, Hiroshima) is a Japanese astronomer. She made headlines while she was a physics graduate student in her 2nd year of Masters at the University of Tokyo's School of Science. Okoda found a dense disk of material around a young star, which may be a precursor of a planetary system. The star in question is known by its catalogue number IRAS 15398-3359.

Okoda and her colleagues are researching the formation of planetary systems through radio-wave observation using the Atacama Large Millimeter Array (ALMA) in Chile. In 2018 Okoda was named one of the 100 influential women in the world by the BBC.

After obtaining her DSc, she works as a researcher at RIKEN.

== Publications ==
- Yuki Okoda, Yoko Oya, Nami Sakai, Yoshimasa Watanabe, Jes K. Jørgensen, Ewine F. Van Dishoeck, and Satoshi Yamamoto. The Co-evolution of Disks and Stars in Embedded Stages: The Case of the Very-low-mass Protostar IRAS 15398-3359 - Astrophysical Journal Letters
