= Tatau (disambiguation) =

Tatau is a town, and the capital of the Tatau District in Bintulu Division, Sarawak, east Malaysia.

Tatau may also refer to:

== Places ==
- Tatau District, Bintulu Division, Sarawak, Malaysia
- Tatau Island, an island of the Tabar Group of Papua New Guinea

== People ==
- Tatau Nishinaga, the fifth president of Toyohashi University of Technology

== Other uses ==
- Tatau (TV series), 2015 UK TV drama series
- Tatau, the word for tattoo in Samoa; the traditional male tatau is the Pe'a and the female equivalent is the Malu
