= Hisayo Momose =

Japanese electrical engineer

Hisayo Sasaki Momose (Japanese: 百瀬 寿代) is a Japanese electrical engineer specializing in semiconductor devices, including MOSFETs and CMOS image sensors. She is a researcher at the Toshiba Center for Semiconductor Research and Development in Kawasaki.

== Education and career ==
Momose is originally from Gifu. She earned a master's degree in chemistry from Ochanomizu University in 1984, and began working for Toshiba in the same year. In 2006 she earned a Ph.D. in electrical engineering from the Tokyo Institute of Technology.

== Recognition ==
Momose was named a Fellow of the IEEE in 2005, "for contributions to ultra-thin gate oxide metal oxide semiconductor field effect transistors". She was named a Fellow of the Japan Society of Advanced Physics in 2009, for her "study on high performance Si CMOS devices".

She was one of a group of Toshiba scientists who won the 2007 Yamazaki-Teiichi Prize, and earned a commendation in 2009 from the Minister of Education, Culture, Sports, Science and Technology, for their work on MOSFET devices.
