= Hiroyuki Matsunami =

Japanese engineer and researcher

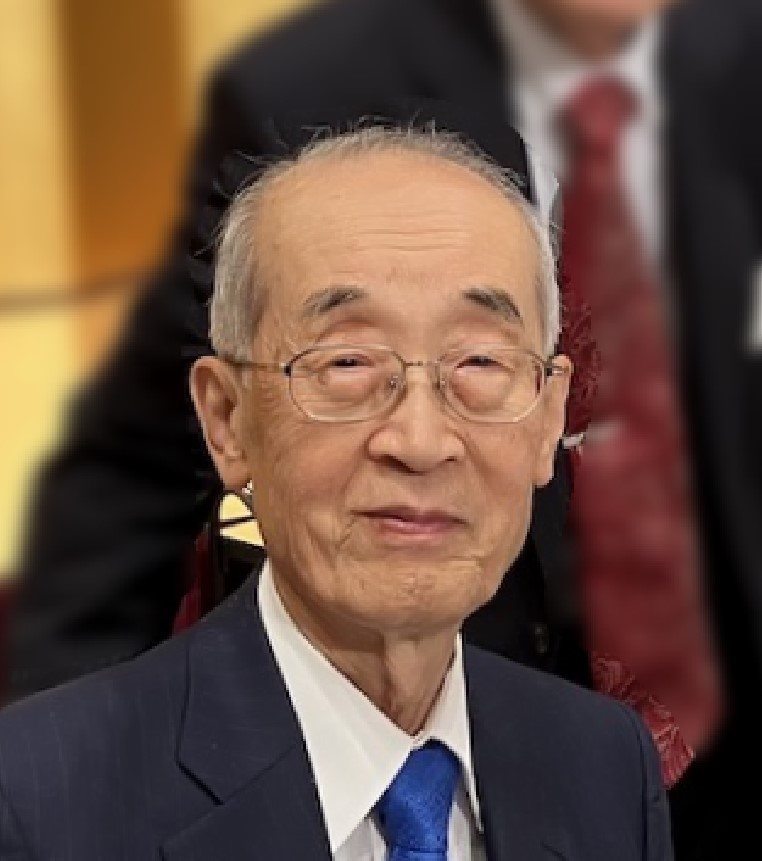
- Born: June 5, 1939 (age 87); Japan・Osaka, Japan
- Education: Kyoto University
- Awards: Asahi Prize (2012); Honda Award (2017); IEEE Edison Medal (2023)

Hiroyuki Matsunami (松波弘之 born June 5, 1939) is a Japanese engineer, researcher and educator. He was awarded the IEEE Edison Medal in 2023 for his pioneering contributions to the development of the material silicon carbide and its applications in electronic power devices. Currently, he holds the position of professor emeritus at Kyoto University and serves as a specially appointed professor at Kyoto University of Advanced Science.

== Biography ==
Hiroyuki Matsunami was born on June 5, 1939 in Osaka Prefecture, Japan. He graduated from Osaka Prefectural Ichioka High School and Kyoto University Faculty of Engineering. He received his Doctorate (Doctor of Engineering) from Kyoto University in 1970. Over a span of 40 years, from 1964 to 2003, he held various positions at the Faculty of Electronic Engineering at Kyoto University, progressing from assistant to associate and then to full-time professor. Currently, he holds the title of professor emeritus at Kyoto University. From 1976 to 1977, he served as a visiting associate professor at North Carolina State University, in the United States. Additionally, from 2004 to 2013, he assumed the role of director of the Innovation Plaza Kyoto, one of the 16 satellite offices of the Japan Science and Technology Agency.

== Research ==
Matsunami directed his focus towards the significant potential of silicon carbide (SiC) as a material for optical and electronic power semiconductor applications. Commencing SiC research in 1968, his inspiration came from the preface of the Proceedings of International Conference on SiC published in 1959, in which Dr. William Shockley (the father of the transistor) predicted the superiority of SiC over silicon (Si). Previously used primarily as an abrasive or in refractory bricks, SiC underwent comprehensive exploration by Matsunami.

This exploration encompassed various facets of SiC, including material preparation, crystal growth, material characterization, device fabrication, and device performance characterization. Throughout his research and education career at Kyoto University, starting in 1964, Matsunami consistently delved into SiC advancements. In 1986, he and his team discovered an effective method for achieving high-quality SiC crystal growth by introducing an appropriate tilt angle to the substrate. This innovation led to the development of a method to grow high-quality epitaxial SiC, devoid of any polytype mixture (approximately 200 kinds), marking a groundbreaking achievement. He named the novel method "step-controlled epitaxy", which became the standard SiC epitaxial growth technique in the SiC semiconductor industry.

In 1995, Matsunami demonstrated high-voltage, low power loss SiC Schottky barrier diodes (SBDs), followed by the introduction of high-performance SiC metal–oxide–semiconductor field-effect transistors (MOSFETs) for the first time, in 1999. Subsequently, SiC emerged as the preferred semiconductor material for high-performance power devices. Matsunami's pioneering research garnered significant attention, laying the foundation for the SiC-based power semiconductor industry. The surge in demand for power semiconductors, particularly with the rise of electric vehicles, has further underscored the pivotal role of SiC semiconductors

== Education ==
Throughout his 40-year tenure as an educator at Kyoto University, his laboratory has had approximately 300 graduates in bachelors, masters, and doctoral programs specialized in electrical engineering, semiconductor physics, materials, and device fields. Many of these graduates have gone to become active professionals, holding positions as engineers, industry leaders, and educators in the electrical, electronic, and semiconductor disciplines. Several have gained international recognition as entrepreneurs, patent attorneys, and interdisciplinary researchers.

Since the 1980s, following his return from North Carolina State University in the United States, he has actively engaged in international exchanges by accepting students from around the world and participating in joint research efforts. Today, international graduates of Matsunami's laboratory are making significant contributions in various fields, both in their home nations and overseas. This initiative has also provided the members of his laboratory with the opportunity to appreciate and understand the importance of international exchange and cooperation.

== Academic Society and Association Activities ==
- President, SiC Alliance, General Incorporated Association (2015–)
- The fellow of Japan Society of Applied Physics
- The fellow of Institute of Electronics, Information Science and Communication Engineers
- The life fellow of IEEE (The Institute of Electrical and Electronics Engineers, Inc.)

== Selected publications ==
- Semiconductor Engineering (1984, Shokodo) (in Japanese)
- Silicon Carbide Vol. I, II (Akademie Verlag, 1997) Co-editor
- Semiconductor Engineering 2nd edition (1999, Shokodo) (in Japanese)
- Semiconductor Materials and Devices (2001, Iwanami Shoten, Fundamentals of Modern Engineering) (in Japanese) Co-author
- Silicon Carbide – Recent Major Advances – (Springer, 2003) Co-editor
- Semiconductor SiC Technology and Applications (Nikkan Kogyo Shimbunsha, 2003) Editor and co-author
- Semiconductor SiC Technology and Applications Second Edition (Nikkan Kogyo Shimbunsha, 2011) Editor and co-author
- Wide Gap Semiconductors—From Dawn to the Frontlines – (Baifukan, 2013)

== Awards and honors ==
- 1998 The 15th Japan Crystal Growth Society Best Paper Award (Step-controlled epitaxy of semiconductor silicon carbide)
- 2001 The 1st Yamazaki-Teiichi Prize (in the field of semiconductors and semiconductor devices) from the Foundation for Promotion of Material Science and Technology of Japan
- 2002 The Commendation for Science and Technology by the Minister of Education, Culture, Sports, Science and Technology of Japan in 2002 (Research Contribution Award)
- 2004 The 4th (2003) Research Achievement Award, The Japan Society of Applied Physics
- 2004 The 41st (2003) Research Achievement Award, The Institute of Electronics, Information Science and Communication Engineers of Japan
- 2005 The SSDM Award 2005, 2005 International Conference on Solid State Devices and Materials
- 2013 The 2012 Asahi Prize (pioneering research of power semiconductor silicon carbides) from the Foundation of Asahi Shimbun
- 2016 The IEEE David Sarnoff Award from the Institute of Electrical and Electronics Engineers
- 2017 Honda Award from the Honda Foundation
- 2019 The Order of the Sacred Treasure, Gold Rays with Neck Ribbon from the Cabinet Office of Government of Japan
- 2023 IEEE Edison Medal from the Institute of Electrical and Electronics Engineers
- 2024 Asian Scientist 100, Asian Scientist
- 2025 The SSDM Award 2025, 2025 International Conference on Solid State Devices and Materials
