= Riken integrated database of mammals =

Riken integrated database of mammals.

Content
- Description: Riken integrated database of mammals.

Contact
- Research center: Riken
- Primary citation: Masuya & al. (2011)

Access
- Website: http://metadb.riken.jp/metadb/download/SciNetS_ria254i

The Riken integrated database of mammals is an integrated database of multiple large-scale programs that have been promoted by the Riken institute.

== See also ==
- Riken
