= Ume Tange =

Japanese nutritional chemist (1873–1955)

- 丹下 梅子
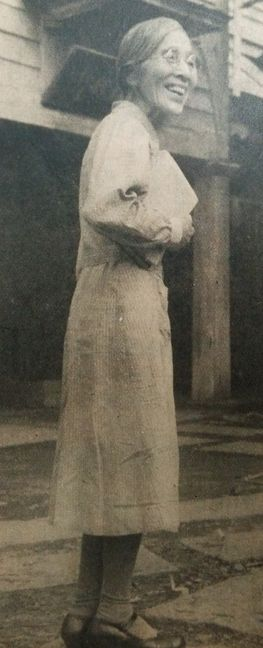
- Ume Tange, July 28, 1948
- Born: Ume (Umeko) Tange; March 17, 1873
- Died: January 29, 1955 (aged 81)
- Education: Japan Women's University; Tohoku Imperial University; Johns Hopkins University; Tokyo Imperial University
- Known for: One of the first Japanese women admitted to university and to gain a science PhD; Laboratory experiments in nutrition; Studies of vitamin B2
- Scientific career
- Workplaces: Japan Women's University; RIKEN
- Thesis: The preparation and properties of the alophanates of certain sterols (1927, second doctorate 1940)

Ume (Umeko) Tange (丹下 梅子; 1873–1955) was one of the first three women admitted to a Japanese university in 1913. She previously studied at a women's college. After graduating from university, she traveled to the US to study, gaining a PhD in chemistry from Johns Hopkins University in 1927, one of the first Japanese women awarded a doctorate in science. Tange returned to Japan to teach and do further research at RIKEN, studying vitamins, especially vitamin B2. She gained a second doctorate, in agricultural science, in 1940, from Tokyo Imperial University (now the University of Tokyo).

== Early life and education ==
Ume Tange was the sixth child of seven siblings in a prosperous family in Kagoshima, southern Japan. She was born on March 17, 1873. While playing with one of her sisters, Tange was injured when she fell on a chopstick, losing the sight in one eye.

Tange began her career as a primary school teacher. In 1901, when she was 28, Tange began studying home economics at a women's college, Japan Women's University. After graduating, she worked as an assistant there, and became the first woman to pass the secondary teacher examination in chemistry.

In 1913, she was one of the first three women admitted to university study in Japan, when she began studies at Tohoku Imperial University along with chemist Chika Kuroda and mathematician Raku Makita, despite controversy.

== Scientific career ==
Tange studied Japan's persimmon tannin while at Tohoku Imperial University. After graduating, at 45 years of age, Tange went to the US to study, spending about 10 years there, including time at Stanford University and Columbia University. Her studies there were sponsored by the Japanese Ministry of Education and Home Ministry. At Johns Hopkins, she was awarded a PhD in 1927, with a thesis entitled The preparation and properties of the alophanates of certain sterols. Results of this work were published with Elmer McCollum in the Journal of Biological Chemistry in 1928.

Tange returned to Japan and taught at Japan Women's University and in 1930 began studies of the vitamin B2 at the RIKEN Institute of Physical and Chemical Research. This work led to her second doctorate, in agriculture, from Tokyo Imperial University in 1940.

Tange published multiple scientific papers in the 1930s, including studies on dietary deficiencies in rats on fat-free diets, vitamin B2 deficiencies in rats, and the effects of fatty acids on nutrition.

== Honors ==
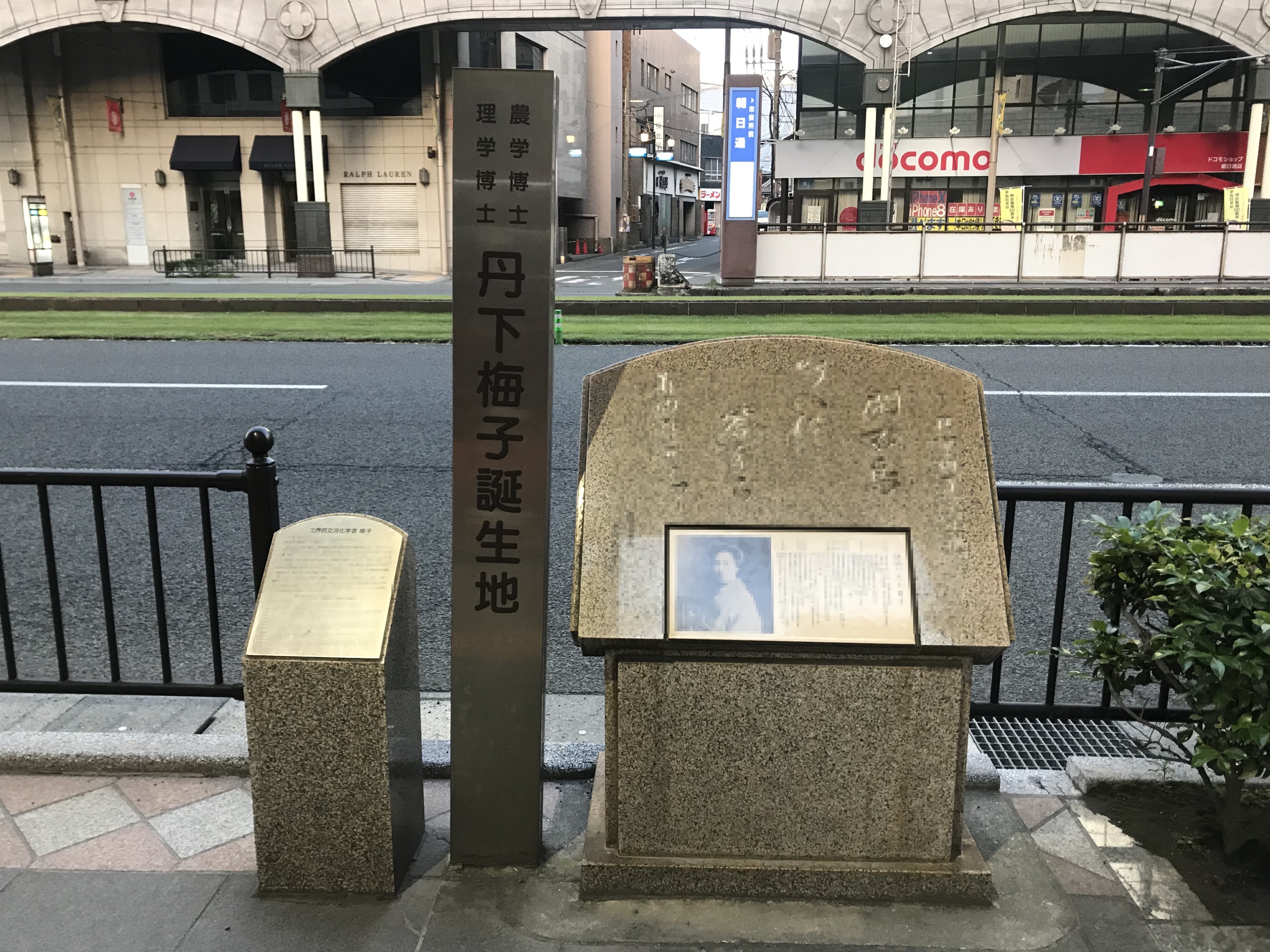
Monument to Ume Tange's birthplace, Kagoshima

- Monument in her birthplace, Kagoshima (pictured).
- Statue in front of the Yamakataya department store, Kagoshima.
- Tange Memorial Scholarship at Japan Women's University for students excelling in science studies.
- Biography published by The Chemical Daily (in Japanese) in 2011, Like White Plum Blossoms: Trajectory of Chemist Ume Tange.
