= Cap analysis of gene expression =

Cap analysis of gene expression (CAGE) is a gene expression technique used in molecular biology to produce a snapshot of the 5′ end of the messenger RNA population in a biological sample (the transcriptome). The small fragments (historically 27 nucleotides long, but now limited only by sequencing technologies) from the very beginnings of mRNAs (5' ends of capped transcripts) are extracted, reverse-transcribed to cDNA, PCR amplified (if needed) and sequenced. CAGE was first published by Hayashizaki, Carninci and co-workers in 2003. CAGE has been extensively used within the FANTOM research projects.

== Analysis ==
The output of CAGE is a set of short nucleotide sequences (often called tags in analogy to expressed sequence tags) with their observed counts. Copy numbers of CAGE tags provide a digital quantification of the RNA transcript abundances in biological samples. Using a reference genome, a researcher can usually determine, with some confidence, the original mRNA (and therefore which gene) the tag was extracted from.

Unlike a similar technique serial analysis of gene expression (SAGE) in which tags come from other parts of transcripts, CAGE is primarily used to locate exact transcription start sites in the genome. This knowledge in turn allows a researcher to investigate promoter structure necessary for gene expression.

CAGE tags tend to start with an extra guanine (G) that is not encoded in the genome, which is attributed to the template-free 5′-extension during the first-strand cDNA synthesis or reverse-transcription of the cap itself. When not corrected, this can induce erroneous mapping of CAGE tags, for instance to nontranscribed pseudogenes. On the other hand, this addition of Gs was also utilised as a signal to filter more reliable TSS peaks.

== History ==
The original CAGE method (Shiraki et al., 2003) was using CAP Trapper for capturing the 5′ ends, oligo-dT primers for synthesizing the cDNAs, the type IIs restriction enzyme MmeI for cleaving the tags, and the Sanger method for sequencing them.

Random reverse-transcription primers were introduced in 2006 by Kodzius et al. to better detect the non-polyadenylated RNAs.

In DeepCAGE (Valen et al., 2008), the tag concatemers were sequenced at a higher throughput on the 454 "next-generation" sequencing platform.

In 2008, barcode multiplexing was added to the DeepCAGE protocol (Maeda et al., 2008).

In nanoCAGE (Plessy et al., 2010), the 5′ ends or RNAs were captured with the template-switching method instead of CAP Trapper, in order to analyze smaller starting amounts of total RNA. Longer tags were cleaved with the type III restriction enzyme EcoP15I and directly sequenced on the Solexa (then Illumina) platform without concatenation.

The CAGEscan methodology (Plessy et al., 2010), where the enzymatic tag cleavage is skipped, and the 5′ cDNAs sequenced paired-end, was introduced in the same article to connect novel promoters to known annotations.

With HeliScopeCAGE (Kanamori-Katayama et al., 2011), the CAP-trapped CAGE protocol was changed to skip the enzymatic tag cleavage and sequence directly the capped 5′ ends on the HeliScope platform, without PCR amplification. It was then automated by Itoh et al. in 2012.

In 2012, the standard CAGE protocol was updated by Takahashi et al. to cleave tags with EcoP15I and sequence them on the Illumina-Solexa platform.

In 2013, Batut et al. combined CAP trapper, template switching, and 5′-phosphate-dependent exonuclease digestion in RAMPAGE to maximize promoter specificity.

In 2014, Murata et al. published the nAnTi-CAGE protocol, where capped 5′ ends are sequenced on the Illumina platform with no PCR amplification and no tag cleavage.

In 2017, Poulain et al. updated the nanoCAGE protocol to use the tagmentation method (based on Tn5 transposition) for multiplexing.

In 2018, Cvetesic et al. increased the sensitivity of CAP-trapped CAGE by introducing selectively degradable carrier RNA (SLIC-CAGE, "Super-Low Input Carrier-CAGE").

In 2021, Takahashi et al. simplified the sequencing of CAGE libraries on Illumina sequencers by skipping second-strand synthesis directly loading single-strand cDNAs (Low Quantity Single Strand CAGE, "LQ-ssCAGE").

In 2025, Delobel et al. updated the nAnTi-CAGE protocol to introduce unique dual indexing, to mitigate the index hopping artifacts that are more frequent in the patterned flow cells used in the 2-color Illumina instruments.

== See also ==
- Serial analysis of gene expression
- RNA-Seq
- Transcriptomics
