= Kazuhito Hashimoto =

Japanese chemist (born 1955)

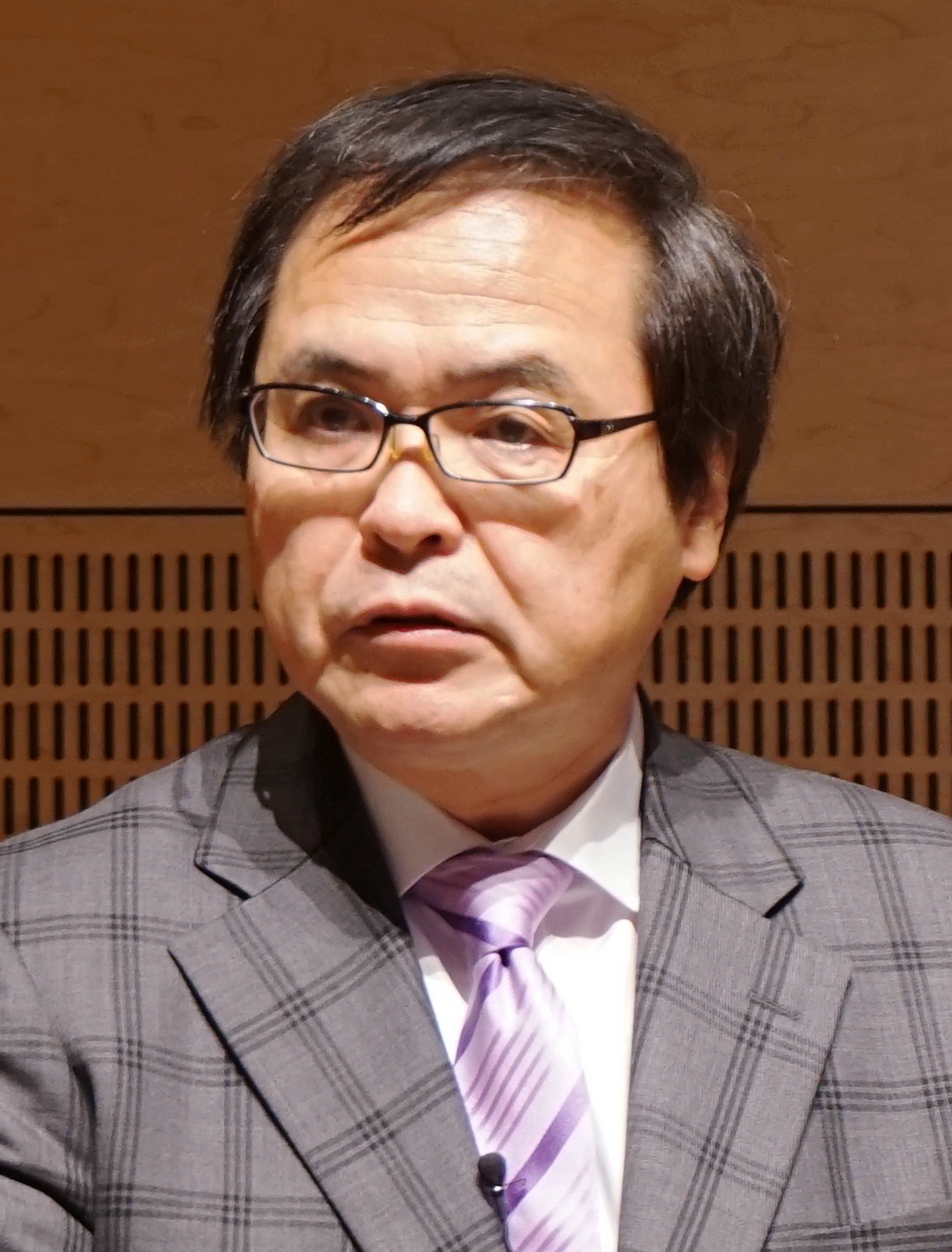
- Hashimoto in 2019
- Born: Kazuhito Hashimoto; June 23, 1955 (age 71)
- Education: University of Tokyo
- Awards: Yamazaki-Teiichi Prize (2006)
- Scientific career
- Fields: Physical chemistry
- Workplaces: University of Tokyo

Kazuhito Hashimoto (橋本和仁, Hashimoto Kazuhito; born June 23, 1955) is a Japanese chemist. Between 2004 and 2007 he headed the Research Center for Advanced Science and Technology at the University of Tokyo. In 2016–2022 he served as President of the National Institute for Materials Science (NIMS) and as the editor-in-chief of the journal Science and Technology of Advanced Materials. On April 1, 2022 he assumed the position of President of Japan Science and Technology Agency.

In 2006 Hashimoto received the Yamazaki-Teiichi Prize for his research on titanium dioxide photocatalyst.

== Biography ==
Hashimoto spent most of his career at the University of Tokyo, where he earned BSc (1978), MSc (1980) and PhD (1985) degrees in physical chemistry. Between 1980 and 1989 he worked as a researcher at the Institute for Molecular Science, Okazaki, Aichi. After that he lectured at the University of Tokyo, where in 1997 he was promoted to full professor, and in 2004 became Director of Research Center for Advanced Science and Technology. In 2016 he was appointed as president of NIMS in Tsukuba. Hashimoto is an executive member of the Council for Industrial Competitiveness and of the Council for Science, Technology and Innovation at the Cabinet Office of Japan.

== Selected publications ==
According to the Web of Science Hashimoto has co-authored 3 articles with more than 1700 citations each:

- Wang, Rong; Hashimoto, Kazuhito; Fujishima, Akira; Chikuni, Makota; Kojima, Eiichi; Kitamura, Atsushi; Shimohigoshi, Mitsuhide; Watanabe, Toshiya (1997). "Light-induced amphiphilic surfaces". Nature. 388 (6641): 431–432. Bibcode:1997Natur.388..431W. doi:10.1038/41233. S2CID 4417645.
- Hashimoto, Kazuhito; Irie, Hiroshi; Fujishima, Akira (2005). "TiO_{2} photocatalysis: A historical overview and future prospects". Japanese Journal of Applied Physics. 44 (12): 8269–8285. Bibcode:2005JaJAP..44.8269H. doi:10.1143/JJAP.44.8269. S2CID 3521064.
- Irie, Hiroshi; Watanabe, Yuka; Hashimoto, Kazuhito (2003). "Nitrogen-Concentration Dependence on Photocatalytic Activity of TiO_{2−x}N_{x} Powders". The Journal of Physical Chemistry B. 107 (23): 5483–5486. doi:10.1021/jp030133h.
