= Shigetada Nakanishi =

Japanese biochemist and neuroscientist

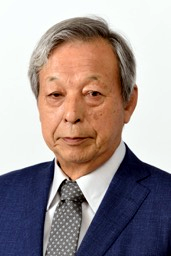
- Shigetada Nakanishi
- Born: January 7, 1942 (age 84); Ogaki, Gifu
- Education: Kyoto University
- Awards: Asahi Prize (1983); Keio Medical Science Prize (1996); Imperial Prize of the Japan Academy (1997); Gruber Prize in Neuroscience (2007)
- Scientific career
- Fields: Neuroscience
- Workplaces: Kyoto University; Osaka Bioscience Institute
- Doctoral students: Yoshiki Sasai

Shigetada Nakanishi (born January 7, 1942) is a Japanese biochemist and neuroscientist. Both a medical doctor and biomedical researcher by training, Nakanishi is the director of the Osaka Bioscience Institute and professor emeritus at Kyoto University. He has received several scientific awards for his research in neuroscience, having characterized the molecular structure or function of several protein receptors.

He is a foreign associate of the National Academy of Sciences and a foreign honorary member of the American Academy of Arts and Sciences in the U.S.

== Early life ==
Nakanishi grew up in Ōgaki in rural central Japan. He earned a medical degree at Kyoto University and, though his family hoped that he would enter medical practice, he continued his studies for a Ph.D. and opted for a research career. Nakanishi said that he considered clinical medicine, but he was swayed toward research as he realized that many modern medical conditions were still not well understood from a basic science perspective.

== Career ==
Nakanishi came to the U.S. in 1971 and was a visiting associate at National Cancer Institute Laboratory of Molecular Biology. In 1974, Nakanishi joined the faculty at Kyoto University. He said that early in his career, there was growing interest in the impact of various enzymes on metabolic processes in cells, but he said that he saw an opportunity in that the underlying protein chemistry of enzymes still was not very well understood. In 2005, Nakanishi was named an emeritus professor at Kyoto and he became director of the Osaka Bioscience Institute.

Nakanishi's research has largely focused on the molecular science behind glutamate receptors. Using electrophysiology and the Xenopus oocyte expression system, Nakanishi's team was able to isolate receptors and ion channels. The team was the first to characterize the molecular structure of NMDA receptors and metabotropic glutamate receptors. The research suggested that specific types of receptors had varying functions in different parts of the brain.

Nakanishi has also been able to detail the structure of receptors for Substance P, Substance K, neurotensin and endothelin. The work with Substance K represented the first time that the structure of a peptide receptor had been elucidated. Modifying a technique invented by a National Cancer Institute colleague, Nakanishi has applied cell ablation to the study of neuroscience. In Nakanishi's version of cell ablation, he is able to eliminate specific nerve cell types one at a time, which aids in the study of brain function, dysfunction and compensation.

In the spring of 2012, Nakanishi announced that the city of Osaka was planning to cut off funding to the Osaka Bioscience Institute as part of a city renewal plan. Nakanishi said that he had not received any communication from the city before the plan was announced. The institute was expected to close within four years.

== Honors and awards ==
Nakanishi won the Asahi Prize in 1983. He was named a foreign honorary member of the American Academy of Arts and Sciences in 1995. The next year, he received the Keio Medical Science Prize. In 1997, Nakanishi won the Imperial Prize of the Japan Academy. He was named a Person of Cultural Merit in Japan in 2006, and he won the 2007 Gruber Prize in Neuroscience. He has also been named a foreign associate of the US National Academy of Sciences and has received the Bristol-Myers Squibb Award for Distinguished Achievement in Neuroscience. He chairs the executive committee of the Kyoto Prize.
