= Haruko Obokata =

Japanese stem-cell researcher

- Born: September 25, 1983 (age 43); Matsudo City, Chiba Prefecture, Japan
- Education: Waseda University
- Known for: STAP cells
- Scientific career
- Fields: Stem cell research
- Workplaces: RIKEN
- Thesis: Isolation of pluripotent adult stem cells discovered from tissues derived from all three germ layers (2011 (revoked in 2015))
- Doctoral advisor: Satoshi Tsuneda

Haruko Obokata (小保方 晴子, Obokata Haruko; born 1983) is a former stem-cell biologist and research unit leader at Japan's Laboratory for Cellular Reprogramming, Riken Center for Developmental Biology. She claimed in 2014 to have developed a radical and remarkably easy way to generate stimulus-triggered acquisition of pluripotency (STAP) cells that could be grown into tissue for use anywhere in the body. In response to allegations of irregularities in Obokata's research publications involving STAP cells, Riken launched an investigation that discovered examples of scientific misconduct on the part of Obokata. Attempts to replicate Obokata's STAP cell results failed. The ensuing STAP cell scandal gained worldwide attention.

== Early life, education and career ==
Obokata was born in Matsudo, Chiba, Japan, in 1983. She attended Toho Senior High School, which is attached to Toho University, and graduated from Waseda University with a B.S. degree in 2006, and an M.S. degree in applied chemistry in 2008. Obokata later joined the laboratory of Charles Vacanti at Harvard Medical School, where she was described as "a lab director’s dream" with "fanatical devotion". In 2011, Obokata completed her Ph.D. in Engineering at the Graduate School of Advanced Engineering and Science at Waseda University. Obokata became a guest researcher at the Riken Center for Developmental Biology in 2011, and in 2013 became head of the Lab for Cellular Reprogramming.

According to an Asahi Shimbun news report, Obokata offered to retract her doctoral dissertation following allegations that she plagiarized segments of her dissertation from publicly available documents from the U.S. National Institute of Health website. In October 2014, an investigative panel appointed by Waseda University gave Obokata one year to revise her dissertation or lose her degree. In 2015, Waseda University announced that it was revoking Obokata's doctoral degree.

== STAP cell reports ==
At Riken, Obokata studied stem cells in collaboration with Vacanti, Teruhiko Wakayama, and Yoshiki Sasai, with two of her research papers accepted for publication in Nature in 2013. In a note to Vacanti, Sasai wrote that Obokata had discovered "a magic spell" that led to their experimental success, described later in The Guardian as "a surprisingly simple way of turning ordinary body cells…into something very much like embryonic stem cells" by soaking them in "a weak bath of citric acid." This procedure was reported to "wash away [the cells'] developmental past," transforming them into "cellular infants, able to multiply abundantly and grow into any type of cell in the body, a superpower known as pluripotency." Upon publication of the papers, Obokata "was hailed as a bright new star in the scientific firmament and a national hero."

== STAP cell controversy ==
Within days of publication of the Nature articles, "disturbing allegations emerged [...] images looked doctored, and chunks of [...] text were lifted from other papers." Critics noted that images in the published articles were similar to those published in Obokata's doctoral thesis, the latter involving different experiments than those presented in the Nature publications.

In 2014 Riken launched an investigation into the issue, and announced on April 1 that Obokata was guilty of scientific misconduct on two of the six charges initially brought against her. The Riken investigation document reported:

In manipulating the image data of two different gels and using data from two different experiments, Dr. Obokata acted in a manner that can by no means be permitted. This cannot be explained solely by her immaturity as a researcher. Given the poor quality of her laboratory notes it has become clearly evident that it will be extremely difficult for anyone else to accurately trace or understand her experiments, and this, too, is considered a serious obstacle to healthy information exchange. Dr. Obokata’s actions and sloppy data management lead us to the conclusion that she sorely lacks, not only a sense of research ethics, but also integrity and humility as a scientific researcher.

Obokata apologised for her "insufficient efforts, ill-preparedness and unskillfulness", and claimed she had only made "benevolent mistakes"; she denied the charge that she had fabricated results, and denied that she lacked ethics, integrity, and humility. Obokata also reported that her STAP cells existed. The Guardian reported that although Obokata's collaborators initially supported her, "one by one they relented and asked Nature to retract the articles." In June 2014, Obokata agreed to retract both papers.

Near the time of retraction, "genetic analysis showed that the STAP cells didn’t match the mice from which they supposedly came." Although Obokata claimed not to know how this was possible, "the obvious, and rather depressing, explanation is that her so-called STAP cells were just regular embryonic stem cells that someone had taken from a freezer and relabelled." In July 2014, Obokata participated, with monitoring by a third party, in Riken's effort to experimentally reproduce the original STAP cell findings. Those efforts failed to replicate the results originally reported.

Although cleared of misconduct, Sasai was criticized for inadequate supervision of Obokata, and he described himself as "overwhelmed with shame". After spending a month in hospital, Sasai took his own life on August 5, 2014.

Obokata resigned from Riken in December 2014.

In a February 2015 article, The Guardian reported that Obokata was guilty of "unbelievable carelessness", having "manipulated images and plagiarised text." Obokata was also described as exhibiting hubris: "If Obokata hadn’t tried to be a world-beater, chances are her sleights of hand would have gone unnoticed and she would still be looking forward to a long and happy career in science. [...] By stepping into the limelight, she exposed her work to greater scrutiny than it could bear."

In 2016, Obokata's book Ano hi (あの日- That Day) was published by Kodansha. In her account of the controversy, Obokata relates her association with Wakayama, writing that "crucial parts of the STAP experiments were handled only by Wakayama", that she received the STAP cells from Wakayama, and that Wakayama "changed his accounts of how the STAP cells were produced." Obokata later wrote "I feel a strong sense of responsibility for the STAP papers [...], "I never wrote those papers to deceive anyone," and "STAP was real."

A short essay by Obokata appeared in the May 17, 2018, issue of Shukan Bunshun magazine, in which she described herself as "a person who has been hounded".

== See also ==
- Academic dishonesty
- Scientific misconduct
- Masayuki Yamato
- List of scientific misconduct incidents
