= Stimulus-triggered acquisition of pluripotency =

Proposed method of generating pluripotent stem cells

Stimulus-triggered acquisition of pluripotency (STAP) was a proposed method of generating pluripotent stem cells by subjecting ordinary cells to certain types of stress, such as the application of a bacterial toxin, submersion in a weak acid, or physical trauma. The technique gained prominence in January 2014 when research by Haruko Obokata et al. was published in Nature. Over the following months, all scientists who tried to duplicate her results failed, and suspicion arose that Obokata's results were due to error or fraud. An investigation by her employer, RIKEN, was launched. On April 1, 2014, RIKEN concluded that Obokata had falsified data to obtain her results. On June 4, 2014, Obokata agreed to retract the papers. On August 5, 2014, Yoshiki Sasai—Obokata's supervisor at RIKEN and one of the coauthors on the STAP cell papers—was found dead at a RIKEN facility after an apparent suicide by hanging.

STAP would have been a radically simpler method of stem cell generation than previously researched methods as it requires neither nuclear transfer nor the introduction of transcription factors.

== Overview ==
Haruko Obokata claimed that STAP cells were produced by exposing CD45^{+} murine spleen cells to certain stresses including an acidic medium with a pH of 5.7 for half an hour. Following this treatment, the cells were verified to be pluripotent by observing increasing levels of Oct-4 (a transcription factor expressed in embryonic stem cells) over the following week using an Oct4-GFP transgene. On average only 25% of cells survived the acid treatment, but over 50% of those that survived converted to Oct4-GFP^{+}CD45^{−} pluripotent cells. The researchers also claimed that treatment with bacterial toxins or physical stress were conducive to the acquisition of pluripotent markers. STAP cells injected into mouse embryos grew into a variety of tissues and organs found throughout the body. According to the researchers, the chimaeric mice "[appeared] to be healthy, fertile, and normal" after one-to-two years of observation. Additionally, these mice produced healthy offspring, thereby demonstrating germline transmission which is "a strict criterion for pluripotency as well as genetic and epigenetic normality."

STAP cells were supposedly able to differentiate into placental cells, meaning they would be more potent than embryonic stem cells or induced pluripotent stem cells (iPS). It was not clear why ordinary cells do not convert into stem cells when subjected to similar stimuli under ordinary conditions, such as acidity in the body; Obokata et al. suggested that in vivo inhibitory mechanisms may block conversion to pluripotency. In February 2014, Charles Vacanti and Koji Kojima (Harvard researchers originally involved in the discovery and publication of STAP) claimed to have preliminary results of STAP cells generated from human fibroblasts, but concomitantly cautioned that these preliminary results require further analysis and validation.

== History ==
In the early 2000s, Charles Vacanti and Martin Vacanti conducted studies that led them to the idea that stem cells—spore-like cells—could be spontaneously recovered from ordinary tissues that are stressed via mechanical injury or increased acidity.

The technique for producing STAP cells was subsequently studied by Obokata at the Brigham and Women's Hospital (BWH), while she was studying as a post doc under Charles Vacanti, and then at the RIKEN Center for Developmental Biology in Japan. In 2008, while working at Harvard Medical School, she verified at the request of Charles Vacanti that some of the cultured cells she was working with shrank to the size of stem cells after being mechanically injured in a capillary tube. She went on as directed, to test the effects of various stimuli on cells. After modifying the technique, Obokata was able to show that white blood cells from newborn mice could be transformed into cells that behaved much like stem cells. She repeated the experiment with other cell types including brain, skin, and muscle cells with the same result.

Initially Obokata's findings were met with skepticism, even among her coworkers. "Everyone said it was an artefact – there were some really hard days", she recalled. The manuscript describing the work was rejected multiple times before its eventual publication as an article (together with a shorter jointly-written "letter") within the journal Nature. A series of experiments, first turning a mouse embryo green by fluorescently tagging STAP cells, then videotaping the transformation of T-cells into pluripotent cells, finally convinced skeptics that the results were real.

=== Investigation into disputed claims ===
In the months after the two Nature papers were released, all scientists who tried to duplicate Obokata's results failed and suspicion arose that her results were due to error or fraud. An investigation into alleged irregularities was launched by RIKEN on February 15, 2014. The allegations questioned the use of seemingly duplicated images in the papers, and reported failure to reproduce her results in other prominent stem-cell laboratories. Nature also announced that they were investigating. Several stem-cell scientists defended Obokata or reserved their opinion while the investigation was ongoing. To address the problem of reproducibility in other laboratories, Obokata published some technical 'tips' on the protocols on March 5 while promising that the detailed procedure would be published in due course.

On March 11, Teruhiko Wakayama, one of Obokata's coauthors, urged all the researchers involved to withdraw the articles, citing many "questionable points". Charles Vacanti said he opposed their retraction and posted a "revised protocol" for creating STAP cells on his own website, which was taken down after he resigned his BWH post.

On March 14, RIKEN released an interim report of the investigation. Out of the six items being investigated, the committee concluded that there was inappropriate handling of data on two items, but did not judge the mishandling as research misconduct. On April 1, RIKEN concluded that Obokata had engaged in "research misconduct", falsifying data on two occasions. The co-authors were cleared of misconduct, but bore "grave responsibility" for not verifying the data themselves. RIKEN also announced that an internal group had been established to verify whether the ‘stimulus-triggered acquisition of pluripotency’ is reproducible. Obokata maintained her innocence and said she would appeal the decision. On June 4, 2014, Obokata agreed to retract both the article and the "letter". The article was officially retracted on July 2, 2014. An article analyzing the controversy concluded that while issues of image manipulation, duplication and plagiarism were potentially detectable, the reviewers could not have concluded that the article was the product of academic misconduct prior to acceptance.

In the wake of the controversy, some commentators argued the scandal reflected broader problems with research oversight at RIKEN and in Japanese science generally.

RIKEN commissioned a team of scientists to attempt to verify Obokata's original results and asked Obokata to participate in the effort. On August 5, 2014, Obokata's supervisor and co-author of the original paper, Yoshiki Sasai, was discovered dead by apparent suicide by hanging in a building at the RIKEN facility in Kobe, Japan. On September 24, 2015, the RIKEN scientists reported that Obokata's STAP cells came from embryonic stem cell contamination, while on the same day, research groups who had attempted to reproduce the STAP protocol jointly reported that they had found it irreproducible.

== Implications ==
If the findings had proven to be valid, stimulus-triggered pluripotency cells could have been generated more easily and efficiently than by existing iPS techniques. Adapted to human tissue, the technique could have led to cheap and simple procedures to create patient-specific stem cells. Stem-cell researcher Dusko Ilic of King's College London called STAP cells "a major scientific discovery that will be opening a new era in stem-cell biology". Shinya Yamanaka, a pioneer of iPS research, called the findings "important to understand nuclear reprogramming ... [and] a new approach to generate iPS-like cells". The idea that STAP cells can form placental tissue meant they could have made cloning considerably easier by bypassing the need for a donor egg and in vitro cultivation.

One previous way of creating stem cells has been via genetic manipulation of adult cells into iPS cells. Progress on iPS-based therapies has been slow due to regulatory hurdles surrounding genetic manipulation. Additionally, iPS techniques have an observed efficiency of around 1%, significantly lower than the claimed efficiency of STAP.

== See also ==
- Induced stem cells
- Muse cell
- Stem cell controversy
- Masayuki Yamato
