= Tatau Nishinaga =

Tatau Nishinaga (西永 頌, Nishinaga Tatau, born August 19, 1939) is the fifth president of Toyohashi University of Technology.

== Academic career ==
He received his Ph.D. in electrical engineering at Nagoya University in 1967. He became a professor at the engineering faculty of Toyohashi University of Technology in 1977, the engineering faculty of Nagoya University in 1980, the engineering faculty of University of Tokyo in 1983, and the engineering and science faculty of Meijo University in 2000. In April 2002, he became the president of Toyohashi University of Technology.

He is a member of American Association for Crystal Growth.

== Awards ==
- 2002 Yamazaki-Teiichi Prize in Semiconductor & Semiconductor Device
