= Roger D. Kamm =

American biological and mechanical engineer

- Born: Roger Dale Kamm
- Education: Northwestern University (BS); Massachusetts Institute of Technology (SM, PhD)
- Known for: Mechanotransduction; Microfluidic organ-on-chip disease models
- Scientific career
- Fields: Mechanobiology; Bioengineering; Microfluidics
- Workplaces: Massachusetts Institute of Technology
- Doctoral advisor: Ascher H. Shapiro
- Website: meche.mit.edu/people/faculty/rdkamm@mit.edu

Roger D. Kamm is an American biological and mechanical engineer recognized for pioneering contributions to mechanobiology, physiological fluid mechanics, and microfluidic models for disease and drug testing. He is the Cecil and Ida Green Distinguished Professor of Biological and Mechanical Engineering at the Massachusetts Institute of Technology (MIT).

== Early life and education ==
Kamm earned his B.S. in Mechanical Engineering from Northwestern University in 1972, followed by an S.M. (1973) and Ph.D. (1977) in Mechanical Engineering from MIT. He completed his doctoral research under Ascher H. Shapiro.

== Academic career ==
After completing his doctorate, Kamm joined the MIT faculty and advanced through the ranks in Mechanical Engineering; he was a founding member of MIT's Department of Biological Engineering in 1998. He served as Associate Head of the MIT Department of Mechanical Engineering from 2005 to 2008.

Kamm directed the National Science Foundation Science and Technology Center on Emergent Behaviors of Integrated Cellular Systems (EBICS) beginning in 2010; the center concluded in 2021.

== Research ==
=== Vascular physiology and neurovascular models ===
Beginning in the mid-2000s, Kamm's lab developed microfluidic platforms capable of 3D, multi-cellular co-cultures to study vascular function. Early work addressed angiogenesis and vasculogenesis, leading to perfusable vascular networks now used to model the blood–brain barrier and neurological disease.

=== Models of metastatic cancer ===
Kamm's group created microfluidic and 3D organotypic systems replicating steps of the metastatic cascade—epithelial–mesenchymal transition, migration, intravasation, and extravasation. These models have illuminated how biochemical and biophysical factors regulate tumor dissemination and drug response.

=== Mechanobiology ===
Kamm's pioneering mechanobiology research demonstrated how physical forces affect cellular behavior, from airway epithelial compression in asthma to force-induced conformational changes in cytoskeletal proteins. His studies revealed growth-factor shedding as a mechanotransduction mechanism and characterized talin–vinculin binding dynamics under load.

=== Computational models of cell mechanics ===
Kamm developed computational and Brownian-dynamics models to explore the mechanical behavior of the cytoskeleton, integrating dynamic cross-links, myosin motor activity, and non-linear viscoelasticity. These models reproduced experimental observations of rigidity sensing, stress response, and migration.

=== Arterial plaque rupture ===
In collaboration with Richard T. Lee, Kamm performed computational and histological analyses showing that rupture of thin fibrous caps over lipid pools is a primary cause of myocardial infarction. Their studies identified stress concentrations in plaque shoulders as failure sites and quantified the effects of calcification on cap stability.

== Honors and recognition ==
Kamm was elected to the National Academy of Medicine in 2010 and to the National Academy of Engineering in 2023. Major awards include the ASME H.R. Lissner Medal (2010), the Huiskes Medal (2015), and the BMES CMBE Shu Chien Scientific Achievement Award (2020). He was the inaugural recipient of the ASME Robert M. Nerem Education and Mentorship Medal in 2018. He is a fellow of AIMBE, ASME, BMES, AAAS, and the International Academy of Medical and Biological Engineering.

== Professional service ==
Kamm has held numerous leadership roles, including Associate Head of MIT Mechanical Engineering (2005–2008), Chair of the U.S. National Committee on Biomechanics (2006–2009), Chair of the World Council on Biomechanics (2006–2010), and Chair of the International Academy of Medical and Biological Engineering (2011–2014).

== Entrepreneurship ==
Kamm co-founded AIM Biotech to commercialize microfluidic 3D tissue culture and assay platforms.

== Personal life ==
Kamm is married to Judith (Judy) Kamm (née Brown) and has a son, Peter Kamm.

== See also ==
- Organ-on-a-chip
- Mechanobiology
