= Doug Lauffenburger =

American academic

Douglas A. Lauffenburger is an American academic who is Ford Professor of Biological Engineering, Chemical Engineering, and Biology at the Massachusetts Institute of Technology (since 2009). He is a member of the David H. Koch Institute for Integrative Cancer Research and MIT Center for Gynepathology Research as well as an Affiliate, The Ragon Institute of Mass General, MIT and Harvard. He is also editor in chief of the journal Integrative Biology.

Lauffenburger’s lab “emphasizes integration of experimental and mathematical/computational analysis approaches, toward development and validation of predictive models for physiologically-relevant behavior in terms of underlying molecular and molecular network properties.”

He was also one of six MIT professors elected as a fellow of the American Association for the Advancement of Science (AAAS) in 2019.

== Biography ==
Lauffenburger earned a B.S. in Chemical Engineering from the University of Illinois and a Ph.D. in Chemical Engineering from the University of Minnesota.

Lauffenburger was a professor at the University of Illinois and the University of Pennsylvania and a visiting professor at the University of Wisconsin before his tenure at MIT. He was a visiting scientist at the University of Heidelberg in Germany.

At MIT, he has been a professor at the Department of Biological Engineering since 1998 and was then Head, 1998-2019; Professor, Department of Chemical Engineering, 1995-present; Professor, Department of Biology, 2002-present. He developed the basis of biological engineering curriculum at MIT which heavily emphasizes quantitative and engineering based biology. He was also instrumental in the development of the Department of Biological Engineering at MIT.

Lauffenburger was elected to the National Academy of Engineering in 2001 “for contributions in molecular and cellular engineering and for interfacing modern biology with engineering principles.”

In February 2021 Lauffenburger co-authored a paper in Nature Communications on how a certain level of COVID-19 anti-bodies may provide lasting protection against the virus. The paper was based on blood samples provided voluntarily by 4300 employees of SpaceX crediting also its CEO Elon Musk.
