= Masayuki Yamato =

Japanese life scientist

Masayuki Yamato (大和 雅之, Yamato Masayuki) is a Japanese life scientist and a professor at Tokyo Women's Medical University. He specializes in regenerative medicine, tissue engineering, and cell biology, and known for research on cell sheets engineering.

He instructed Haruko Obokata there and wrote a paper on STAP cell with her, Charles Vacanti and Yoshiki Sasai.

He was interested in tacit knowing, a concept which Michael Polanyi and Shinichiro Kurimoto also developed.

== Career ==
Yamato was born at Tokyo in 1964. He graduated from Tokyo University.

== Works ==
'Gossipy Cells'(Oshaberina Saibou tachi おしゃべりな細胞たち ) published by Kodansha
