= Joseph P. Vacanti =

American surgeon and researcher (born 1948)

- Born: October 31, 1948 (age 77); Omaha, Nebraska, U.S.
- Education: Creighton University (BS); University of Nebraska Medical Center (MD); Harvard University (MS)
- Scientific career
- Fields: Pediatric surgery Tissue engineering Regenerative medicine
- Workplaces: Massachusetts General Hospital

Joseph P. Vacanti (born October 31, 1948) is an American pediatric surgeon and researcher who is the director of the Laboratory of Tissue Engineering and Organ Fabrication at Massachusetts General Hospital. He is the John Homans Professor of Surgery at Harvard Medical School.

Along with Robert Langer, Eugene Bell, and Yuan-Cheng Fung, he is considered as a father of tissue engineering with seminal contributions as co-author of the Principles of Tissue Engineering (with Langer, Robert Lanza, and Anthony Atala) and creation of the Vacanti mouse in 1997.

Vacanti was elected to the National Academy of Medicine in 2001.

He graduated from Creighton University (BA), Harvard Medical School (MS), and the University of Nebraska Medical Center (MD).

== Biography ==
Vacanti was born in Omaha, Nebraska in 1948, the oldest of four brothers who are also scientists: Charles Vacanti, Martin, and Francis. Following education at Creighton University and the University of Nebraska Medical Center (MD 1974), Vacanti trained in surgery at the Massachusetts General Hospital in Boston, MA, Boston Children's Hospital, and further specialized in transplantation at the University of Pittsburgh.

He pursued additional training in the lab of cancer biologist Judah Folkman from 1977-1979 where he met frequent collaborator Robert Langer. He was appointed surgeon-in-chief of the Massachusetts General Hospital for Children in 2003 and was the president of the American Pediatric Surgical Association from 2019-2020.

== Career ==
A major focus of Vacanti's research has been the development of biomaterials and surgical techniques for tissue engineering, which he defined in 1993 as a field that "applies the principles of biology and engineering to the development of functional substitutes for damaged tissue."

In 1988, Vacanti demonstrated the first biodegradable polymer scaffold for cell transplantation. He is most well known for the development, along with Charles Vacanti and Linda Griffith of MIT, of the Vacanti mouse. He has published over 350 scientific papers.

He co-founded the journal Tissue Engineering and was the founding president of the Tissue Engineering Society (which evolved into TERMIS), co-founded in 1994 with Charles Vacanti, Joseph Upton of the Beth Israel Deaconess Medical Center and Harvard Medical School, Tony Atala of Boston Children's Hospital, Mark Randolph of the Massachusetts General Hospital and Linda Griffith of MIT. Vacanti was awarded the lifetime achievement award from TERMIS in 2017.

In his lab at the Massachusetts General Hospital, Vacanti advised or co-advised many prominent researchers in the field, including David J. Mooney and Antonios Mikos.

== Awards ==
- 1999: The Clemson Award for Contributions to the Literature of the Society For Biomaterials
- 2001: Elected to the Institute of Medicine, National Academy of Sciences
- 2007: John Scott Medal
- 2009: Flance-Karl Award from the American Surgical Association
- 2011: Thomson Reuters Citation Laureate in Physiology or Medicine
- 2017: Jacobson Innovation Award of the American College of Surgeons
- 2017: Lifetime Achievement award TERMIS
- 2021: Stem Cell and Regenerative Medicine Lifetime Achievement Award of the Regenerative Medicine Foundation
