= Yoshiki Sasai =

Japanese stem cell biologist

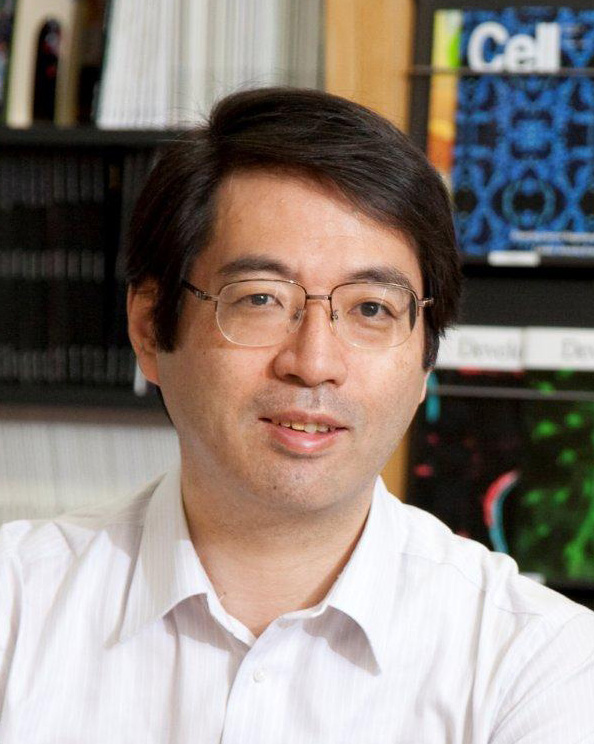
- Sasai, c. 2012
- Born: 5 March 1962; Hyogo, Japan
- Died: 5 August 2014 (aged 52); Kobe, Hyogo, Japan
- Cause of death: Suicide by hanging
- Education: Kyoto University
- Awards: Osaka Science Prize; Inoue Prize for Science
- Scientific career
- Fields: Biology
- Workplaces: RIKEN
- Doctoral advisor: Shigetada Nakanishi
- Website: www.cdb.riken.jp/sasai/ (archived)

Yoshiki Sasai (笹井 芳樹, Sasai Yoshiki; 5 March 1962 – 5 August 2014) was a Japanese stem cell biologist. He developed methods to guide human embryonic stem cells (hESCs) into forming brain cortex, eyes (optic cups), and other organs in tissue culture. Sasai worked at the Riken Center for Developmental Biology (CDB) in Kobe, and was Director of the Laboratory for Organogenesis and Neurogenesis. Following his involvement in the 2014 STAP cell controversy, Sasai was found dead at Riken from an apparent suicide.

== Early life and education ==
Yoshiki Sasai was born in 1962 in Hyogo, Japan. He received his medical degree from Kyoto University's School of Medicine in 1986. In 1993 Sasai was awarded a PhD from the Kyoto University School of Medicine, and served a residency at Kobe Municipal General Hospital.

== Career ==
Sasai worked as a research fellow at Edward M. De Robertis's laboratory at UCLA School of Medicine until 1996. Sasai became an associate professor at Kyoto University in 1996, and a full professor in 1998. In 2003 he moved to the RIKEN Center for Developmental Biology as Director of the organogenesis and neurogenesis group.

Sasai was known for developing methods to grow stem cells into organ-like structures. In 2012, Sasai became the first stem cell researcher to grow an optic cup from human cells.

=== STAP controversy ===
In 2014 Sasai was a co-author on two papers published in Nature, shortly thereafter retracted, that described stimulus-triggered acquisition of pluripotency or "STAP" cells.

A subsequent investigation by Riken found that Sasai's co-author, Haruko Obokata, had committed scientific misconduct in the STAP cell experiments, and criticized Sasai for inadequate supervision of Obokata. In response to the Riken investigation, Sasai described himself as "overwhelmed with shame", and following a month of hospitalization was found dead from an apparent suicide by hanging on August 5, 2014.

== Awards and honours ==
- 1998 Human Frontier Science Program 10th Anniversary Award
- 2006 Bälz Preis
- 2009 MECSST Award for Science and Technology
- 2010 Osaka Science Prize for his work on in vitro recapitulation of brain development
- 2011 Nakaakira Tsukahara Memorial Award
- 2012 Sayer Vision Research Lecture Award from National Institutes of Health
- 2012 Inoue Prize for Science.
- 2012 Yamazaki-Teiichi Prize
- 2012 Takeda Award
- 2013 Hans Sigrist Prize

== See also ==
- List of scientific misconduct incidents
