= Charles Vacanti =

American doctor and academic (born 1950)

- Born: 1950 (age 75–76); Omaha, Nebraska, U.S.
- Other name: Chuck Vacanti
- Education: Creighton University, University of Nebraska College of Medicine
- Known for: Vacanti mouse, STAP cells
- Spouse: Linda
- Scientific career
- Fields: Tissue engineering, anesthesiology, stem cells
- Workplaces: Brigham and Women's Hospital (retired), Harvard Medical School
- Notable students: Haruko Obokata
- Website: Brigham and Women's profile

Charles Alfred "Chuck" Vacanti (born 1950) is an American researcher in tissue engineering and stem cells and the Vandam/Covino Professor of Anesthesiology, Emeritus, at Harvard Medical School. He is a former head of the Department of Anesthesiology at the University of Massachusetts and Brigham and Women’s Hospital, now retired.

He is known for the Vacanti mouse, a mouse created with Linda Griffith and Joseph Upton with cartilage shaped like a human ear on its back, and for being the senior author on the first of two retracted articles on STAP cells, a concept proposed by his brother and himself, and co-authored with Haruko Obokata.

== Career ==
Vacanti graduated from Creighton Preparatory High School, gained his B.A. from Creighton University in 1968, and his M.D. from the University of Nebraska College of Medicine in 1975, and then completed his surgical intern and residency at Medical Center Hospital of Vermont (now called the University of Vermont Medical Center) in 1978. With his brothers, he was named Alumnus of the Year in 2002 and received an Alumni Achievement Citation from Creighton in 2005.

Vacanti was a research associate at MIT and the Children's Hospital Boston, and an anesthesiologist at Massachusetts General Hospital. He became chair of the Department of Anesthesiology at the University of Massachusetts Medical Center and a Professor of Anesthesiology and Surgery at the University of Massachusetts Medical School. He was elected to Alpha Omega Alpha in 2002.

In September 2002, Vacanti joined Brigham and Women's Hospital, succeeding Simon Gelman as department chair for Anesthesiology, Perioperative and Pain Medicine. Following the STAP cells controversy, Vacanti stood down as department chair at Brigham and Women's Hospital and took a one-year sabbatical from September 1, 2014, then retired in 2015.

He has published over 200 articles, abstracts, and books. He co-founded the Tissue Engineering Society, and holds a number of patents related to stem cells. He was President of the Society of Academic Anesthesiology Chairs in 2007–8.

=== Tissue engineering ===
Although his background is in anesthesiology, Vacanti began work in tissue engineering in the late 1980s with his brother Joseph, also known as Jay, who was working on liver regeneration.

In 1989, Vacanti first grew a piece of human cartilage in vitro on a biodegradable scaffold; the work was rejected from a "top journal" as it was said to have "no practical implications". Surprised by this, Vacanti gathered from colleagues that the most difficult cartilagenous replacement was the ear. After refining the techniques and building on the work of Robert Langer at MIT, in 1997 Vacanti and colleagues at the University of Massachusetts controversially and with much media attention grew a cartilage structure resembling a human ear on the back of a nude mouse - dubbed the Earmouse, Auriculosaurus or Vacanti mouse - using a polymer scaffold and cow knee chondrocyte cells.

Vacanti and his brother Joseph successfully used the same technique to grow a chest plate for a 12-year-old boy, Sean McCormack, who had been born without cartilage or bone over his heart and left lung. In 1998, the team at Massachusetts led by Vacanti grew a replacement thumb bone using a scaffold of coral for a man, Raul Murcia, whose thumb had been crushed. The work was approved by the FDA, but they did not approve also growing cartilage and tendons. Vacanti also grew a new trachea for a 14-year-old girl.

Vacanti says that he coined the term tissue engineering in 1991 in the context of organ replacement, though it had been used earlier for other uses and his coining is disputed (for example, the term was used in 1984 in the same context by an ophthalmic surgeon).

=== Stem cells ===
==== Spore-like cells ====
The idea for what would later be called STAP cells ("stimulus-triggered acquisition of pluripotency") came from Vacanti, who with his brother Martin, known as Marty, believed that adult mammalian tissues contained tiny pluripotent cells that were released when the tissue was injured or stressed.

Charles had persuaded Marty, a pathologist, to move from Nebraska to work with him in 1996, and he asked Marty if he could find adult stem cells as an alternative to standard adult cells, which quickly die in culture, and fetal cells, which are controversial to use. Vacanti was motivated to work on stem cells by the desire to treat his brother's Down syndrome.

Marty first identified what they believed were tiny stem cells in rat brain tissue that he had sliced and forced through small tubes. The first time he identified them, they were working under pressure to show results to a television crew, and many colleagues were skeptical of the results. They published work in 2001 describing these "spore-like cells", and reported that these cells could survive anoxic conditions for days and that they were able to grow a variety of tissues including pancreas and lung from isolated spore-like cells.

==== STAP cells ====
"When a certain number of your cells die, other cells turn on a survival mechanism, and they turn into stem cells. It’s Mother Nature’s repair process."

— Charles Vacanti

Charles continued to work on these cells when he moved to Harvard, including with thoracic surgeon Koji Kojima who identified them in lung tissue. Vacanti recruited a graduate student, Haruko Obokata, in his lab at Harvard from 2008, and she worked on the spore-like cells and made them the focus of her thesis; Obokata achieved growing the cells into teratomas, which Vacanti had not.

Charles later refined this theory to suggest that stress or injury could actually trigger the development of pluripotency in somatic cells, and initially kept this idea from Obokata. He first proposed this to Obokata and Masayuki Yamato at a conference in Florida in 2010; Yamato had independently come to the same conclusion.

Vacanti kept Obokata on as a post-doc. He initially proposed the use of ATP as an energy source for the injured cells. Obokata interpreted the improved results as being due to the low pH of the ATP solution, rather than as its properties as an inflammasome. She then returned to Japan and continued this work at RIKEN. Vacanti was excluded from the development of a stem cell line by Obokata in collaboration with Yoshiki Sasai.

===== Publication =====
Vacanti presented these results in July 2012 at the Society of Cardiovascular Anesthesiologists conference, and then in January 2014 the journal Nature published two articles suggesting that a simple acid treatment could cause mouse blood cells to become pluripotent.

The Boston Globe reported that "His discovery is a reminder that as specialized as science is, sometimes, a little ignorance may be a virtue. A stem-cell expert would probably never have even bothered to try the experiment Vacanti has been pursuing, on and off, since the late 1990s." However, Vacanti felt that his Harvard team did not get due credit for the origin of the work.

Vacanti claimed that February to have replicated the effect in human skin fibroblast cells, and said "We believe that this is exactly what happens in the body during attempts to repair any damaged or diseased tissue". Vacanti said in 2012 he had used the technique to grow a replacement trachea using autologous cells from a patient.

===== Scandal =====
"Vacanti was so convinced that he was right. This is why scientific method was invented—to prevent us from falling victim to our biases."

— George Q. Daley

However, the results could not be reproduced by other researchers in the field and the green glow of the cells said to indicate pluripotency was interpreted by a graduate student of George Daley seconded to Vacanti's lab as auto-fluorescence from dying cells.

Both STAP articles were retracted in July 2014 after an investigation by RIKEN concluded that the data were fabricated. Despite eventually agreeing with the retractions, Vacanti stated that "there has been no information that cast doubt on the existence of the stimulus-triggered acquisition of pluripotency (STAP) cell phenomenon itself." John Rasko and Carl Power writing in The Guardian noted that although Vacanti's colleague Obokata and others at RIKEN took most of the blame for the STAP cell retractions, Vacanti himself "did almost as much to confuse the issue of replication as Obokata herself" by claiming to be able to replicate the results and providing 'recipes' (on his website) to produce STAP cells in March and September 2014, which no other researchers could reproduce.

Vacanti's lab closed and he retired in 2015 following the STAP scandal, but as of 2016 he continued to believe in the principle of stress-induced pluripotency. In January 2017, he asked the US patent office to reconsider a rejected STAP cell patent and submitted new experiments to support this claim.

=== Works ===
- Charles Vacanti; Scott Segal; Pankaj Sikka; Richard Urman, eds. (August 2011). Essential Clinical Anesthesia. Cambridge University Press. ISBN 9780521720205.
- Vacanti, Charles A.; Vacanti, Joseph P. (1991). Braverman, MH; Tawes, RL (eds.). "Functional organ replacement: The new technology of tissue engineering". Surgery Technology International. I: 43–49. PMID 28581583.

== Personal life ==
Vacanti was born in Omaha, Nebraska, the second brother in a Sicilian family with eight children; his parents were Charles J. Vacanti and JoAnne K Vacanti (née Franco). His father was a Professor of Dentistry at Creighton University (which Vacanti also later attended) and an early worker in root canal surgery, and his mother studied Chemistry pre-med at university until she was married. His father died of a heart attack in 1994 and Charles has also experienced heart problems.

He was interested in engineering as a child, and became an anesthesiologist due to an interest in the equipment. Charles collects and restores vintage motorcycles.

=== Siblings ===
He has four brothers and three sisters: his elder brother Dr. Joseph P. Vacanti (considered one of the "fathers of tissue engineering"), and his younger brothers Dr. Martin P. Vacanti and Dr. Francis X. Vacanti are all medical researchers; they are "very competitive" and collectively, they have been called the "first family of tissue engineering". His other brother Carl has Down syndrome.
