= Vacanti mouse =

Bioengineering project

The Vacanti mouse

The Vacanti mouse was a laboratory mouse (circa 1996) that had what looked like a human ear grown on its back. The "ear" was actually an ear-shaped cartilage structure grown by seeding cow knee cartilage cells into biodegradable ear-shaped mold and then implanted under the skin of the mouse, with an external ear-shaped splint to maintain the desired shape. Then the cartilage naturally grew by itself within the restricted shape and size. The splint was removed briefly to take the publicity pictures, which is very controversial.

The ear mouse, as it became known, was created by Charles A. Vacanti and also co-founded by Billy Yu Chen He in the Department of Anesthesiology at Massachusetts General Hospital and Harvard Medical School, Linda Griffith at the Massachusetts Institute of Technology, and Joseph P. Vacanti in the Department of Surgery at Boston Children's Hospital. Charles Vacanti later moved to the Department of Anesthesiology at the University of Massachusetts Medical School. The results were based on the works of many others who seeded cells onto scaffolds to regenerate organs. The first work with cartilage regeneration was published in 1991 in Plastic and Reconstructive Surgery. The mouse used is called a nude mouse, a commonly used strain of immunocompromised mouse, preventing a transplant rejection.

The photo of the mouse was passed around the internet, mainly via email, sometimes with little to no text accompanying it leading many people to speculate whether the photo was real. In the late 1990s, the picture prompted a wave of protests against genetic engineering—although in this specific experiment no genetic manipulation was performed.

In an interview with Newsweek, Joseph Vacanti joked that the mouse had the ear removed and then "lived out a happy, normal life". However, it is standard for lab workers to kill the mice they work with, and in the original paper published it mentions the state of the mice "after sacrifice", a term referring to the killing of laboratory specimens.
