= Riken =

Japanese research organization

Institute of Physical and Chemical Research (Riken)
- 理化学研究所 (理研)
- Formation: 1917; 109 years ago
- Type: Designated National Research and Development Institute
- Headquarters: Wakō, Saitama Prefecture, Japan
- Location: 7 campuses
- Coordinates: 35°46′49″N 139°36′45″E
- Affiliations: Asian Research Network
- Website: www.riken.jp

Riken (Japanese: 理研; English: /ˈrɪkɛn/; stylized in all caps as RIKEN) is a national scientific research institute in Japan. Founded in 1917, it now has about 3,000 scientists on seven campuses across Japan, including the main site at Wakō, Saitama Prefecture, on the outskirts of Tokyo. Riken is a Designated National Research and Development Institute, and was formerly an Independent Administrative Institution.

Riken conducts research in various fields of science, including physics, chemistry, biology, genomics, medical science, engineering, high-performance computing and computational science, and ranging from basic research to practical applications with 485 partners worldwide. It is almost entirely funded by the Japanese government, with an annual budget of ¥100 billion (US$750 million) in FY2023.

== Name ==
"Riken" is an acronym of the formal name Rikagaku Kenkyūsho (理化学研究所), and its full name in Japanese is Kokuritsu Kenkyū Kaihatsu Hōjin Rikagaku Kenkyūsho (国立研究開発法人理化学研究所) and in English is the Institute of Physical and Chemical Research, the National Research and Development Corporation.

== History ==
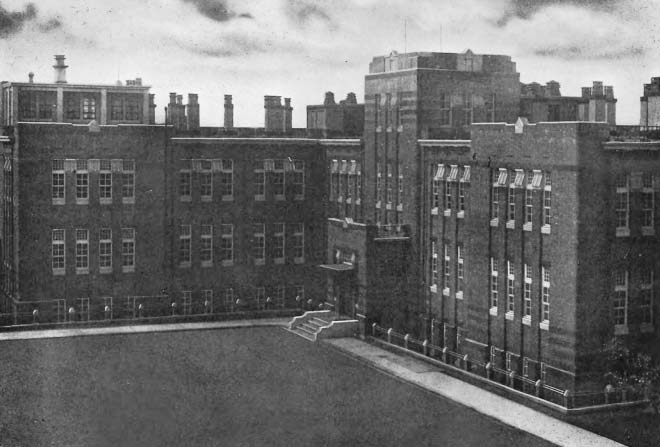
Riken in the Taishō period

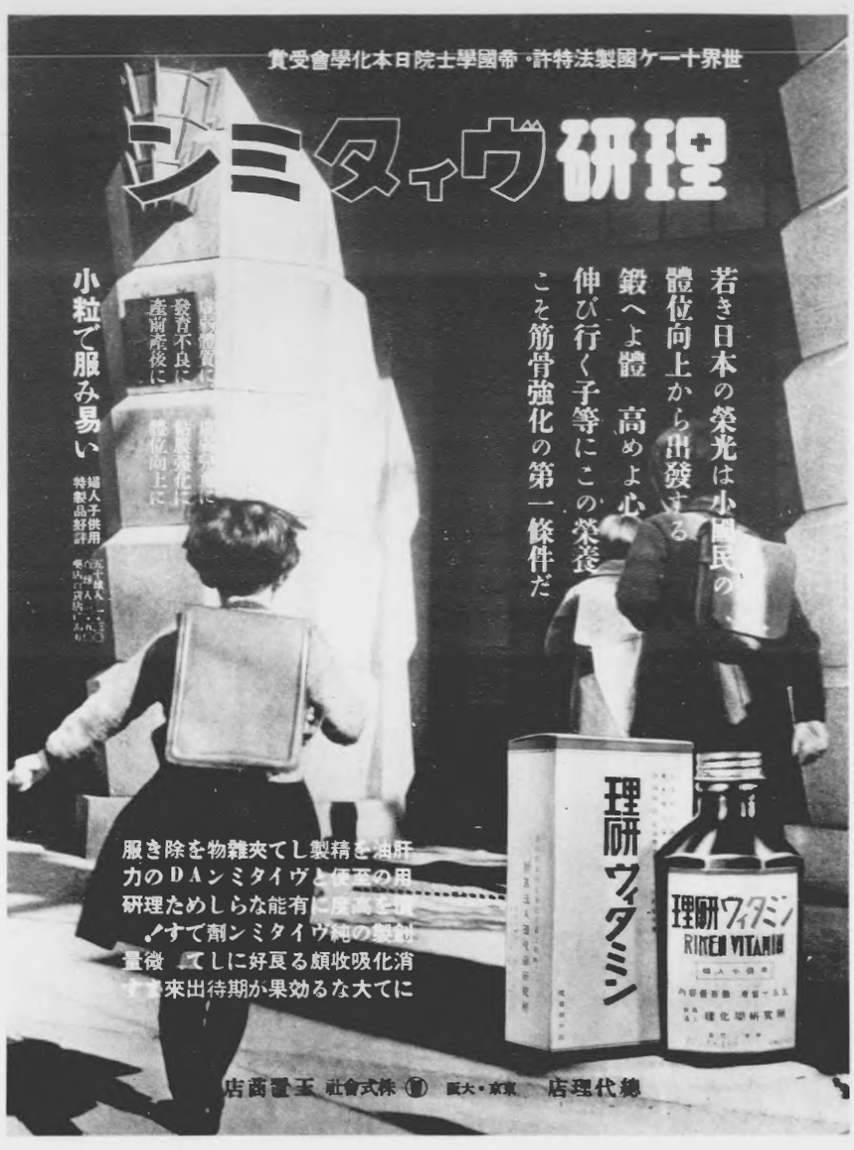
A 1938 ad for Riken Vitamin A

In 1913, the well-known scientist Jokichi Takamine first proposed the establishment of a national science research institute in Japan. This task was taken on by Viscount Shibusawa Eiichi, a prominent businessman, and following a resolution by the Diet in 1915, Riken came into existence in March 1917. In its first incarnation, Riken was a private foundation (財団法人, zaidan), funded by a combination of industry, the government, and the Imperial Household. It was located in the Komagome district of Tokyo, and its first director was the mathematician Baron Dairoku Kikuchi.

In 1927, Viscount Masatoshi Ōkōchi, the third director, established the Riken Concern (a zaibatsu). This was a group of spin-off companies to market commercial products based on Riken's scientific achievements and return the profits to Riken. At its peak in 1939 the zaibatsu comprised about 121 factories and 63 companies, including Riken Kankōshi, which is now Ricoh.

During World War II, the Japanese army's atomic bomb program was conducted at Riken. In April 1945 the US bombed Riken's laboratories in Komagome, and in November, after the end of the war, Allied soldiers destroyed its two cyclotrons.

After the war, the Allies dissolved Riken as a private foundation, and it was brought back to life as a company called Kagaku Kenkyūsho (科学研究所), or Kaken (科研). In 1958 the Diet passed the Riken Law, whereby the institute returned to its original name and entered its third incarnation, as a public corporation (特殊法人, tokushu hōjin), funded by the government. In 1963 it relocated to a large site in modern day Wakō then until 1970 in Saitama Prefecture, just outside Tokyo.

Since the 1980s Riken has expanded dramatically. New labs, centers, and institutes have been established in Japan and overseas, including:

- in 1984, the Life Science Center in Tsukuba
- in 1995, the Muon Research Facility at the Rutherford Appleton Laboratory in the UK
- in 1997, the Harima Institute, the Brain Science Institute in Wako, and the center at the Brookhaven National Laboratory in the United States of America
- in 1998, the Genomic Sciences Center
- in 2000, the Yokohama Institute, which now contains four centers for research in the life sciences
- in 2002, the Kobe Institute, which contains the Center for Developmental Biology

In October 2003, Riken's status changed again, to Independent Administrative Institution. As such, Riken is still publicly funded, and it is periodically evaluated by the government, but it has a higher degree of autonomy than before. Riken is regarded as the flagship research institute in Japan and conducts basic and applied experimental research in a wide range of science and technology fields including physics, chemistry, medical science, biology and engineering.

Riken was the subject of international attention in 2014 after the Stimulus-triggered acquisition of pluripotency cell (also known as STAP) publication, investigation, retraction, and suicide of Yoshiki Sasai, the principal investigator.

== Organizational structure ==
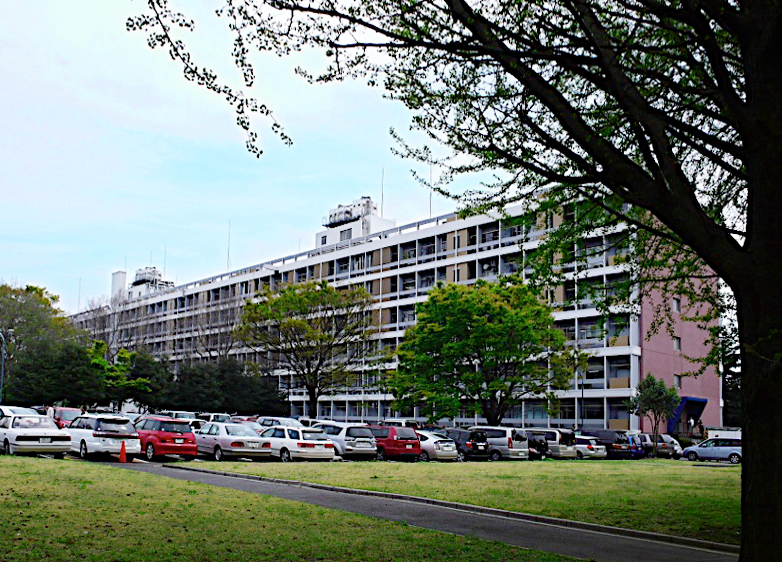
Main Research Building in Wako

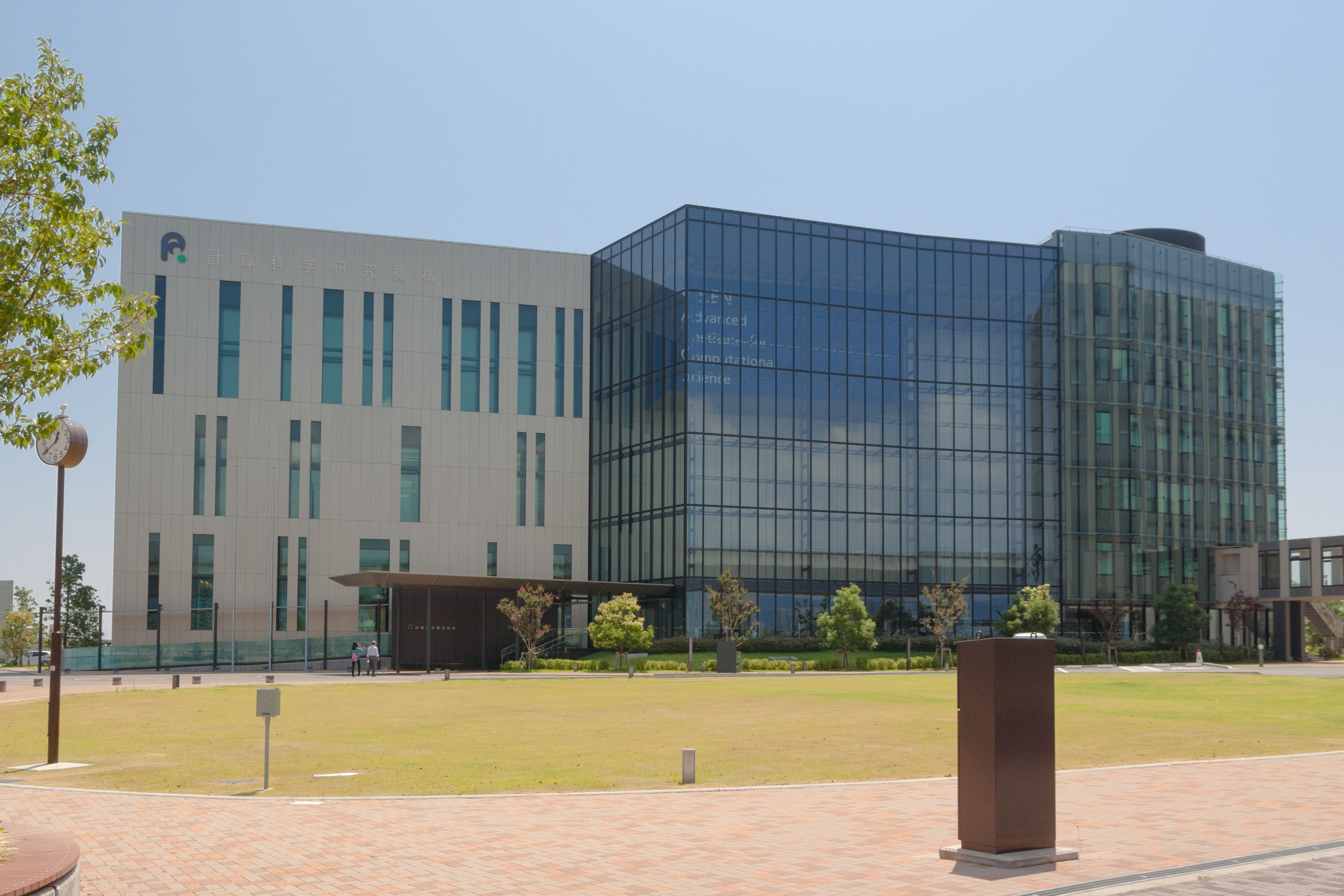
Advanced Institute for Computational Science in Kobe

The main divisions of Riken are listed here. Purely administrative divisions are omitted.

- Headquarters (mostly in Wako)
- Wako Branch
  - Center for Emergent Matter Science (research on new materials for reduced power consumption)
  - Center for Sustainable Resource Science (research toward a sustainable society)
  - Nishina Center for Accelerator-Based Science (site of the Radioactive Isotope Beam Factory, a heavy-ion accelerator complex)
  - Center for Brain Science
  - Center for Advanced Photonics (research on photonics including terahertz radiation)
  - Research Cluster for Innovation
  - Cluster for Pioneering Research (chief scientists)
  - Interdisciplinary Theoretical and Mathematical Sciences Program
- Tokyo Branch
  - Center for Advanced Intelligence Project (research on artificial intelligence)
- Tsukuba Branch
  - BioResource Research Center
- Harima Institute
  - Riken SPring-8 Center (site of the SPring-8 synchrotron and the SACLA x-ray free electron laser)
- Yokohama Branch (site of the Yokohama Nuclear magnetic resonance facility)
  - Center for Sustainable Resource Science
  - Center for Integrative Medical Sciences (research toward personalized medicine)
  - Center for Biosystems Dynamics Research (also based in Kobe and Osaka)
  - Program for Drug Discovery and Medical Technology Platform
  - Structural Biology Laboratory
  - Sugiyama Laboratory
- Kobe Branch
  - Center for Biosystems Dynamics Research (developmental biology and nuclear medicine medical imaging techniques)
  - Center for Computational Science (R-CCS, home of the Fugaku super computer and now decommissioned K computer)

== Achievements ==
- Two Riken scientists have won the Nobel prize for physics: Hideki Yukawa in 1949 and Shin'ichirō Tomonaga in 1965.
- The SPring-8 (Super Photon Ring 8GeV) facility in Harima is one of the largest and most powerful third-generation synchrotron radiation facilities.
- In July 2004 a team at Riken created element 113 (now named nihonium, after Nihon = Japan). On April 2, 2005 the same team successfully created it for the second time, and a third event was seen in 2012. The discovery was officially recognized by the International Union of Pure and Applied Chemistry (IUPAC) and the International Union of Pure and Applied Physics (IUPAP) in December 2015.
- The Riken Super Combined Cluster is one of the world's fastest supercomputers. In January 2006, Riken set up the Next-Generation Supercomputer R&D Center, with the purpose of designing and building the fastest supercomputer in the world, and in June 2006, it announced the completion of a one-petaFLOPS computer system designed specially for molecular dynamics simulation. While the K computer was being installed at Riken, in 2011 it topped the LINPACK benchmark with the performance of 8.162 petaFLOPS, or 8.162 quadrillion calculations per second, with a computing efficiency ratio of 93.0%, making it the fastest supercomputer in the world at the time. The complete project entered service in November 2012.

== List of presidents ==
- Dairoku Kikuchi (1917)
- Kōi Furuichi (1917–1921)
- Masatoshi Ōkōchi (1921–1946)
- Yoshio Nishina (1946–1951)
- Kiichi Sakatani (1951–1952)
- Takeshi Murayama (1952–1956)
- Masanori Satō (1956–1958)
- Haruo Nagaoka (1958–1966)
- Shirō Akahori (1966–1970)
- Toshio Hoshino (1970–1975)
- Shinji Fukui (1975–1980)
- Tatsuoki Miyajima (1980–1988)
- Minoru Oda (1988–1993)
- Akito Arima (1993–1998)
- Shunichi Kobayashi (1998–2003)
- Ryōji Noyori (2003 – 31 March 2015)
- Hiroshi Matsumoto (1 April 2015 – 31 March 2022)
- Makoto Gonokami (1 April 2022–present)

== Notable scientists and affiliated people ==
- Kotaro Honda, inventor of KS steel
- Kikunae Ikeda, discoverer of monosodium glutamate and the umami flavor
- Dairoku Kikuchi, mathematician and the first Director of Riken
- Seishi Kikuchi, physicist, known for his explanation of the Kikuchi lines
- Hiroaki Kitano systems biologist involved in RoboCup, AIBO etc.
- Chika Kuroda, chemist, known for research on natural dyes, and one of the first three women to receive a bachelor's degree in Japan
- Daniel Loss, physicist, known for proposing the Loss–DiVincenzo quantum computer
- Kōsuke Morita, physicist, leader of team that discovered element 113, now named nihonium after Japan
- Hantaro Nagaoka, postulator of the Saturnian model of the atom
- Ukichiro Nakaya, physicist and essayist
- Yoshio Nishina, leading atomic physicist who worked with Bohr, Einstein, Heisenberg and Dirac
- Ryōji Noyori, past President, and winner of the Nobel Prize for Chemistry in 2001
- Masatoshi Ōkōchi, physicist and the third Director of Riken
- Yoshiki Sasai, developmental biologist who grew an optic cup from stem cells
- Umetaro Suzuki, discoverer of vitamin B1
- Toshio Takamine, specialist in spectroscopy, author of The "Near Infra-Red Spectra of Helium and Mercury" and "Absorption of Ha Line" and "The structure of mercury lines examined by an echelon grating and a Lummer-Gehrcke plate"
- Masayo Takahashi, pioneer in the clinical application of iPS Cell (induced Pluripotent Stem Cell) technology on macular degeneration
- Masatoshi Takeichi, discoverer of the cadherin family of cell-cell adhesion molecules and head of the Riken Center for Developmental Biology
- Ume Tange (jp), researcher on vitamins, and one of first three women to receive a bachelor's degree in Japan
- Torahiko Terada, physicist and essayist
- Yoshinori Tokura, pioneer of strongly-correlated electron systems in Japan
- Shin'ichirō Tomonaga, winner of the 1965 Nobel physics prize for his work on quantum electrodynamics
- Susumu Tonegawa, head of the Brain Science Institute and winner of the 1987 Nobel Prize for Physiology or Medicine for his discovery of the mechanism of antibody diversity
- Michiyo Tsujimura, biochemist, known for isolating components of green tea
- Tadashi Watanabe, head of Riken's Next-Generation Supercomputer R&D Center
- Toshiko Yuasa, Japan's first female physicist, who specialized in nuclear physics
- Hideki Yukawa, physicist who won the 1949 Nobel prize for his prediction of the pion
- Hidetoshi Katori, physicist who invented the magic wavelength technique enabling the realization of ultra high precision optical lattice atomic clocks

== See also ==
- Riken integrated database of mammals
