= Reference intake (disambiguation) =

Reference intake may refer to:

- Dietary Reference Intake – US system of nutrition recommendations
- Reference Daily Intake – US/Canada food nutrient labelling system
- Reference Intake – EU/UK food nutrient labelling system

== See also ==
- Dietary Reference Values – EU/UK system of nutritional advice
- Guideline Daily Amount – Former UK and EU food labelling system
