= Brain Licker =

Type of confectionery

Brain Licker is a type of confectionary manufactured by Key Enterprises. It is typically sold in small bottles plugged with a plastic ball which revolves when licked, delivering its sour liquid content. It is about as acidic as lemon juice and excessive consumption can lead to burns, blisters or small cuts in children's mouths. In 2003 the British Food Standards Agency issued warnings to parents regarding this as well as possible choking hazards. There are several different flavours of Brain Licker, the most popular of which are strawberry, peach, apple, blue raspberry, grape, blackberry, lemon, watermelon and cola.
