= Tolerable dose =

Tolerable dose may refer to:

- Maximum tolerated dose before death
- Tolerable upper intake levels, maximal recommended dietary intake not to have harmful effects
