= Food Standards Scotland =

Food safety agency

- Scottish Gaelic: Inbhe-Bidhe Alba

Agency overview
- Type: Non-ministerial government department
- Jurisdiction: Scotland
- Headquarters: Pilgrim House, Old Ford Road, Aberdeen, AB11 5RL
- Employees: 160
- Annual budget: £20 million
- Minister responsible: Stephen Flynn, Cabinet Secretary for Economy, Tourism and Transport
- Agency executives: Heather Kelman, Chair of the Board; Catherine Topley, Chief executive
- Website: www.foodstandards.gov.scot

Food Standards Scotland (FSS; Scottish Gaelic: Inbhe-Bidhe Alba) is a non-ministerial government department of the Scottish Government. It is responsible for food safety, food standards, nutrition, food labelling and meat inspection in Scotland. Established by the Food (Scotland) Act 2015, Food Standards Scotland has taken over the responsibilities of the UK-wide organisation, the Food Standards Agency, in Scotland.

== Duties ==
The key areas of responsibility outlined in the Act include:

- making sure food in Scotland remains safe to eat
- providing advice around improving diet and nutrition for people in Scotland
- providing regulation effectively and proportionately
- supporting the food and drink industry in Scotland, including its reputation
- supporting food and drink policy in Scotland

As well as replacing the duties of the Food Standards Agency in Scotland, Food Standards Scotland has a role in diet and nutrition policy. It also has powers to be able to seize food where labelling rules have not been met.

FSS has a consumer protection role: making sure that food is safe to eat, ensuring consumers know what they are eating and improving nutrition. FSS has a vision of a food and drink environment in Scotland that benefits, protects and is trusted by consumers.

FSS has a role in providing information and advice on food safety and standards, nutrition and labelling. The information provided is intended to be independent, consistent, evidence-based and consumer-focused.

FSS develops policies, provides policy and consumer advice and delivers a regulatory and enforcement strategy. FSS is funded mainly by government and charges fees to recover costs for regulatory functions.

== Governance ==
The FSS Board meets in public. Policy recommendations and decisions, and the reasons for them, will be publicly available via the website.

== Background ==
In 2010, the UK Government decided to move responsibility for nutrition and food labelling and standards in England from the Food Standards Agency (FSA) to the Department of Health and the Department for Environment, Food and Rural Affairs (Defra).

Following this the Scottish Government commissioned an independent review to assess the feasibility of establishing a stand-alone Scottish food standards body. The review was led by Professor Jim Scudamore and reported in 2012.

== Transition ==
Having been established by legislation in January 2015, Food Standards Scotland was launched on 1 April 2015.

In advance of the legislation being finalised the FSA in Scotland moved their office to The Pilgrim House, in the centre of Aberdeen.

In November 2014, it was announced that Ross Finnie would be appointed as the Chair of Food Standards Scotland. Geoff Ogle who had been Acting Director for the Scottish branch of Food Standards Agency since June 2014 became the new organisation's Chief Executive.

In June 2026, it was announced that Catherine Topley would be appointed as its new Chief Executive.

Catherine took up the post in July 2026, succeeding Geoff Ogle, who retired after 11 years leading Scotland’s food regulator since its establishment in 2015.

== Passage of the Bill ==
Plans to create a new food standards body in Scotland were announced by Ministers in June 2012. A public consultation ran between February and May 2013. The Bill passed Stage 2 on the legislative process in November 2014.

The Bill was introduced to Scottish Parliament on 13 March 2014. The Bill passed Stage 2 of the legislative process on 11 November 2014. In August 2014, support for the new body was given by MSPs on the Health and Sport Committee. It received Royal assent on 13 January 2015.

== See also ==
- Food Standards Agency
