= Reference Intake =

EU/UK food nutrient labelling system

Reference Intake (RI) is a food labelling system in the European Union and the United Kingdom. It is a means of communicating recommended nutrient intake to the public. Reference Intakes replaced the term Guideline Daily Amount (GDA), although the principles behind both are the same. The major difference is that GDAs existed for men, women and children; there is only one set of RIs for an average adult.

Energy or nutrient	Reference Intake
Energy	8400 kJ / 2000 kcal
Total fat	70 g
Saturates	20 g
Carbohydrates	260 g
Sugars	90 g
Protein	50 g
Salt	6 g

These RIs are based on the requirements for an average woman with no special dietary requirements and assume an energy intake of 8400 kJ. The information is for guidance only and should not be considered individual advice.

The change from GDA to RI on labels on pre-packaged food and drinks sold in the UK is due to Regulation (EU) 1169/2011. The intention of the EU Regulation is to harmonise across Europe the content, expression and presentation of the nutrition information given to consumers.

Since RIs are for an average adult, concerns have been raised by major retailers and manufacturers that they may face criticism for misrepresenting the contribution to the diet of products targeted at children, particularly given concerns around children's diet and obesity levels.

RIs can be combined with traffic light labeling to make the information easily and rapidly understood.

== See also ==
- Dietary Reference Values – EU/UK system of nutritional advice
- List of food labeling regulations
- Nutrition facts label
- Reference Daily Intake – US/Canada food nutrient labelling system
- Traffic light label
- United Kingdom food information regulations
