= Traffic light system =

Traffic light system may refer to:

- Traffic light rating system, colour-based status indicator system
  - COVID-19 Protection Framework, system for COVID-19 pandemic restrictions in New Zealand
- A system of traffic lights
