= Quack Miranda warning =

American warning required of unapproved dietary supplements

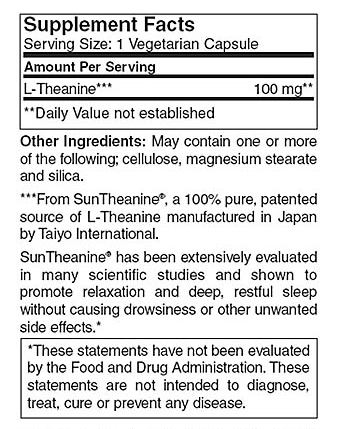
DSHEA caveat on a packet of Theanine capsules

The quack Miranda warning is a term used by skeptics to describe the text which the Dietary Supplement Health and Education Act of 1994 (DSHEA) requires that all labels and marketing materials for products sold as dietary supplements carry. That text is:

These statements have not been evaluated by the Food and Drug Administration. This product is not intended to diagnose, treat, cure or prevent any disease.

The term is a reference to the Miranda warning used by law enforcement agencies, and to quack medicine.

The warning is also used by websites selling a variety of alternative medicine products and unproven devices.

== See also ==
- Safe harbor (law)
- Nutrition facts label
- Warning label
