= Lydia Roberts =

American nutritionist

Lydia Jane Roberts
- Born: June 30, 1879; Hope Township, Michigan
- Died: May 28, 1965 (aged 85); Rio Piedras, Puerto Rico
- Education: University of Chicago
- Occupation: nutritionist

Lydia Jane Roberts (1879–1965) was a pioneering nutritionist in childhood nutrition, especially in creating government nutrition standards like the Recommended Dietary Allowances (RDA) of minerals and vitamins. She studied and taught at the University of Chicago, receiving her Ph.D. in home economics in 1928 and later becoming department chair in 1930.

== Early life ==
Lydia Jane Roberts was born June 30, 1879, in Hope Township, Barry County, Michigan to Warren and Mary (McKibbin) Roberts. She was one of four children. Her father was a carpenter. He moved the family to Martian, Michigan not long after the birth of Lydia.

== Education ==
Roberts attended primary and high school in Martin, Michigan. She completed a one-year course at Mt. Pleasant Normal School in 1899, and was later awarded a Life Certificate from Mt. Pleasant Normal School, allowing her to teach at any Michigan elementary school. Roberts entered with advanced standing at the University of Chicago in 1915 where she majored in home economics under the direction of noted biochemist Katharine Blunt.

== Career ==
After receiving her degree in home economics in 1917, Roberts worked as an assistant professor at the University of Chicago. Upon the completion of her Ph.D., she was promoted to associate professor. Roberts received full professorship and was appointed to the Chair of the Home Economics Department in 1930. During her time as chair, she also led the committee for creating the Recommended Daily Allowances, the suggested daily intake of nutrients. Due to mandatory retirement, Roberts left the University of Chicago in 1944 and took on the role of professor and Chair of the University of Puerto Rico, a position she held from 1946 to 1952 when she retired. After retirement, Roberts continued to be active in initiatives for nutritional improvements for Puerto Rican families.

== Work ==
Roberts had been a leader in the development of the first set of RDAs, or recommended daily allowances. Roberts possessed the knowledge and expertise to create a scientifically sound set of RDAs. Her leadership approach was described as being democratic. Roberts had been a member of the National Research Council's committee for food and nutrition. She had served on three committees of the White House Conference on Child Health and Protection. She had been a member of the American Medical Association's Council on Foods and Nutrition. Throughout her career, her main work had been along the lines of improving nutrition for children and families in need.

== Achievements ==
Roberts has been acknowledged for her work in nutrition. She received the Borden award of the Home Economics Association in 1938, the Marjorie Hulsizer Copher Award in 1952 from the American Dietetic Association, and in 1957, for her work with nutrition services to children, she received the Marshall Field Award.

Additionally, Roberts has authored many books on nutrition. Her most notable book is Nutrition Work with Children, which was her dissertation for her Ph.D. before publishing it in 1928 as a textbook, focused on the nutritional needs of children.

Other books written by Roberts include The Road to Good Nutrition (1942), Patterns of Living in Puerto Rican Families (1949), and The Dona Elena Project: Better Living Program in an Isolated Rural Community (1963).

== Death ==
On May 28, 1965, Roberts died in Rio Piedras, Puerto Rico, from a ruptured abdominal aneurism. She is buried in East Martin Cemetery in Martin, Michigan.

== See also ==
- Dietary Reference Intake
