= Table of food nutrients =

The tables below include tabular lists for selected basic foods, compiled from United States Dept. of Agriculture (USDA) sources. Included for each food is its weight in grams, its calories (in kilocalories), and the number of grams of protein, carbohydrates, dietary fiber, fat, and saturated fat. As foods vary by brands and stores, the figures should only be considered estimates, with more exact figures often included on product labels. For precise details about vitamins and mineral contents, the USDA source can be used.

To use the tables, click on "show" or "hide" at the far right for each food category. In the Measure column, "t" = teaspoon and "T" = tablespoon. In the food nutrient columns, the letter "t" indicates that only a trace amount is available.

== Dairy products ==
Dairy products
Food	Measure	Grams	Calories	Protein	Carb	Fiber	Fat	Sat_fat
Cow's milk, whole	1 qt.=4cups*	976	660	32	48	0	40	36
skim	1 qt.	984	360	36	52	0	t	t
Buttermilk, cultured	1 cup	246	127	9	13	0	5	4
Evaporated, undiluted	1 cup	252	345	16	24	0	20	18
Fortified milk	6 cups	1,419	1,373	89	119	1.4	42	23
Powdered milk, whole	1 cup	103	515	27	39	0	28	24
skim, instant	1 1/3 cups	85	290	30	42	0	t	t
skim, non-instant	2/3 cup	85	290	30	42	1	t	t
Goat's milk, fresh	1 cup	244	165	8	11	0	10	8
Malted milk
(1/2 cup ice cream)	2 cups	540	690	24	70	0	24	22
Cocoa	1 cup	252	235	8	26	0	11	10
Yogurt, of partially
skim. milk	1 cup	250	128	18	13	1	4	3
Milk pudding
(cornstarch)	1 cup	248	275	9	40	0	10	9
Custard, baked	1 cup	248	285	13	28	0	14	11
Ice cream, commercial	1 cup	188	300	6	29	0	18	16
Ice milk, commercial	1 cup	190	275	9	32	0	10	9
Cream, light,								
or half-and-half	1/2 cup	120	170	4	5	0	15	13
Cream, heavy,
or whipping	1/2 cup	119	430	2	3	1	44	27
Cheese, cottage, creamed	1 cup	225	240	30	6	0	11	10
uncreamed	1 cup	225	195	38	6	0	t	t
Cheddar, or American	1-in. cube	17	70	4	t	0	6	5
Cheddar, grated cup	1/2 cup	56	226	14	1	0	19	17
Cream cheese	1 oz.	28	105	2	1	0	11	10
Processed cheese	1 oz.	28	105	7	t	0	9	8
Roquefort type	1 oz.	28	105	6	t	0	9	8
Swiss	1 oz.	28	105	7	t	0	8	7
Eggs, boiled, poached,								
or raw	2	100	150	12	t	0	12	10
Scrambled, omelet,								
or fried	2	128	220	13	1	0	16	14
Yolks only	2	34	120	6	t	0	10	8

== Oils, fats and shortenings ==
Oils, fats and shortenings
Food	Measure	Grams	Calories	Protein	Carb	Fiber	Fat	Sat_fat
Butter	1T.	14	100	t	t	0	11	10
Butter	1/2 cup							
or	1/4 lb.	112	800	t	1	0	90	80
Hydrogenated cooking fat	1/2 cup	100	665	0	0	0	100	88
Lard	1/2 cup	110	992	0	0	0	110	92
Margarine, 1/2 pound or	1/2 cup	112	806	t	t	0	91	76
Margarine, 2 pat or	1 T.	14	100	t	t	0	11	9
Mayonnaise	1 T.	15	110	t	t	0	12	5
Oils
Corn, soy, peanut								
or cottonseed	1 T.	14	125	0	0	0	14	5
Olive	1T.	14	125	0	0	0	14	3
Safflower, sunflower								
seed, walnut	1 T.	14	125	0	0	0	14	3
Salad dressing
French	1 T.	15	60	t	2	0	6	2
Thousand Island	1 T.	15	75	t	1	0	8	3
Salt pork	2 oz.	60	470	3	0	0	55	

== Meat and poultry ==
Meat and poultry
Food	Measure	Grams	Calories	Protein	Carb	Fiber	Fat	Sat_fat
Bacon, crisp, drained	2 slices	16	95	4	1	0	8	7
Beef, chuck, pat-roasted	3 oz.	85	245	23	0	0	16	15
Hamburger, commercial	3 oz.	85	245	21	0	0	17	15
Ground lean	3 oz.	85	185	24	0	0	10	9
Roast beef,	3 oz	85	148	23	6.1	0	2.4	
oven-cooked	3 oz.	85	390	16	0	0	36	35
Steak, as sirloin	3 oz.	85	330	20	0	0	27	25
Steak, lean, as round	3 oz.	85	220	24	0	0	12	11
Corned beef	3 oz.	85	185	22	0	0	10	9
Corned beef hash,								
canned	3 oz.	85	120	12	6	t	8	7
Dried or chipped	2 oz.	56	115	19	0	0	4	4
Pot pie, 4 1/2" diameter	1 pie	227	480	18	32	t	28	25
Stew, with vegetables	1 cup	235	185	15	15	t	10	9
chicken; broiled	3 oz.	85	185	23	0	0	9	7
Fried, breast or								
leg and thigh	3 oz.	85	245	25	0	0	15	11
Roasted	3 1/2 oz.	100	290	25	0	0	20	16
Chicken livers, fried	3 med.	100	140	22	2.30	0	14	12
Duck, domestic	3 1/2 oz.	100	370	16	0	0	28	0
Lamb, chop, broiled	4 oz.	115	480	24	0	0	35	33
Leg roasted	3 oz.	86	314	20	0	0	14	14
Shoulder, braised	3 oz.	85	285	18	0	0	23	21
Pork, chop, 1 thick	3 1/2 oz.	100	260	16	0	0	21	18
Ham, cured, and								
pan-broiled	3 oz.	85	290	16	0	0	22	19
Ham, as luncheon meat	2 oz.	57	170	13	0	0	13	11
Ham, canned, spiced	2 oz.	57	165	8	1	0	14	12
Pork roast	3 oz.	85	310	21	0	0	24	21
Pork sausage, bulk	3 1/2 oz.	100	475	18	0	0	44	40
Turkey, roasted	3 1/2 oz.	100	265	27	0	0	15	0
Veal, cutlet, broiled	3 oz.	85	185	23	0	0	9	8
Roast	3 oz.	85	305	13	0	0	14	13

== Fish and seafood ==
Fish and seafood
Food	Measure	Grams	Calories	Protein	Carb	Fiber	Fat	Sat_fat
Clams, steamed or canned	3 oz.	85	87	12	2	0	1	0
Cod, broiled	3 1/2 oz.	100	170	28	0	0	5	0
Crab meat, cooked	3 oz.	85	90	14	1	0	2	0
Fish sticks, breaded,								
fried	5	112	200	19	8	0	10	5
Flounder, baked	3 1/2 oz.	100	200	30	0	0	8	0
Haddock, fried	3 oz.	85	135	16	6	0	5	4
Halibut, broiled	3 1/2 oz.	100	182	26	0	0	8	0
Herring, kippered	1 small	100	211	22	0	0	13	0
Lobster, steamed	aver.	100	92	18	t	0	1	0
Mackerel, canned	3 oz.	85	155	18	0	a	9	0
Oysters, raw	6-8 med.							
or	1/2 cup	120	85	8	3	0	2	0
Oyster stew, made								
with milk	1 cup	230	200	11	11	0	12	0
Salmon, canned	3 oz.	85	120	17	0	0	5	1
Sardines, canned	3 oz.	85	180	22	0	0	9	4
Scallops, breaded, fried	3 1/2 oz.	100	104	18	10	0	8	0
Shad, baked	3 oz.	85	170	20	0	0	10	0
Shrimp, steamed	3 oz.	85	110	23	0	0	1	0
Swordfish, broiled	1 steak	100	180	27	0	0	6	0
Tuna, canned, drained	3 oz.	85	170	25	0	0	7	3

== Vegetables ==
Vegetables A-E
Food	Measure	Grams	Calories	Protein	Carb	Fiber	Fat	Sat_fat
Artichoke, globe	1 large	100	8-44	2	10+	2	t	t
Asparagus, green	6 spears	96	18	1	3	0.5	t	t
Beans, green snap	1 cup	125	25	1	6	0.8	t	t
Lima, green	1 cup	160	140	8	24	3.0	t	t
Lima, dry, cooked	1 cup	192	260	16	48	2	t	t
Navy, baked with pork	3/4 cup	200	250	11	37	2	6	6
Red-kidney, canned	1 cup	260	230	15	42	2.5	1	0
Bean sprouts, uncooked	1 cup	50	17	1	3	0.3	t	0
Beet greens, steamed	1 cup	100	27	2	6	1.4	t	0
Beetroots, boiled	1 cup	165	1	12	0.80	t	0	
Broccoli, steamed	1 cup	150	45	5	8	1.9	t	0
Brussels sprouts, steamed Cabbage, as coleslaw	1 cup	130	60	6	12	1.7	t	0
Sauerkraut, canned	1 cup	150	32	1	7	1.2	t	0
Steamed cabbage	1 cup	170	40	2	9	1.3	t	0
Carrots, cooked, diced	1 cup	150	45	1	10	0.9	t	0
Raw, grated	1 cup	110	45	1	10	1.2	t	0
Strips, from raw	1 mad.	50	20	t	5	0.5	t	0
Cauliflower, steamed	1 cup	120	30	3	6	1	t	0
Celery, cooked, diced	1 cup	100	20	1	4	1	t	0
Stalk raw	1 large	40	5	1	1	0.3	t	0
Chard steamed, leaves and stalks	1 cup	150	30	2	7	1.4	t	0
Collards, steamed leaves	1 cup	150	51	5	8	2	t	0
Corn, steamed,	1 ear	100	92	3	21	0.8	1	t
cooked or canned	1 cup	200	170	5	41	1.6	t	0
Cucumbers, 1/8" slices	8	50	6	t	1	0.2	0	0
Dandelion greens, steamed	1 cup	180	80	5	16	3.2	1	0
Eggplant, steamed	1 cup	180	30	2	9	1.0	t	0
Endive (escarole)	2 oz.	57	10	1	2	0.6	t	0

Vegetables F-P
Food	Measure	Grams	Calories	Protein	Carb	Fiber	Fat	Sat_fat
Kale, steamed	1 cup	110	45	4	8	0.9	1	0
Kohlrabi, raw, sliced	1 cup	140	40	2	9	1.5	t	0
Lambs quarters, steamed	1 cup	150	48	5	7	3.2	t	0
Lentils	1 cup	200	212	15	38	2.4	t	0
Lettuce, loose leaf, green	1/4 head	100	14	1	2	0.5	t	0
Iceberg	1/4 head	100	13	t	3	0.5	t	0
Mushrooms, cooked or								
canned	4	120	12	2	4	t	t	0
Mustard greens, steamed	1	140	30	3	6	1.2	t	0
Okra, diced, steamed	1 1/3 cups	100	32	1	7	1	t	0
Onions, mature cooked	1	210	80	2	18	1.6	t	0
Raw, green	6 small	50	22	t	5	1	t	0
Parsley, chopped, raw	2 T.	50	2	t	t	t	t	0
Parsnips, steamed	1 cup	155	95	2	22	3	1	0
Peas, green, canned	1 cup	100	66	3	13	0.1	t	0
Fresh, steamed	1 cup	100	70	5	12	2.2	t	0
Frozen, heated	1 cup	100		5	12	1.8	t	0
Split cooked	4 cups	100	115	8	21	0.4	t	0
With carrots, frozen,								
heated	1 cup	100	53	3	10	1	t	0
Peppers, pimientos,								
canned	1 pod	38	10	t	2	t	t	0
Raw, green, sweet	1 large	100	25	1	6	1.4	t	0
Stuffed with beef								
and crumbs	1 med.	150	255	19	24	1	9	8
Potatoes, baked	1 med.	100	100	2	22	0.5	t	0
French-fried	10 pieces	60	155	-1	20	0.4	7	3
Mashed with milk								
and butter	1 cup	200	230	4	28	0.7	12	11
Potatoes, pan-fried	3/4 cup	100	268	4	33	0.40	14	6
Scalloped with cheese	3/4 cup	100	145	6	14	0.40	8	7
Steamed before peeling	1 med.	100	80	2	19	0.40	t	0
Potato chips	10	20	110	1	10	t	7	4

Vegetables R-Z
Food	Measure	Grams	Calories	Protein	Carb	Fiber	Fat	Sat_fat
Radishes, raw	5 small	50	10	t	2	0.3	0	0
Rutabagas, diced	4 cups	100	32	t	8	1.4	0	0
Soybeans, unseasoned	1 cup	200	260	22	20	3.2	11	0
Spinach, steamed	1 cup	100	26	3	3	1	t	0
Squash, summer	1 cup	210	35	1	8	0.6	t	0
Winter, mashed	1 cup	200	95	4	23	2.6	t	0
Sweet potatoes, baked	1 med.	110	155	2	36	1	1	0
Candied	1 med.	175	235	2	80	1.5	6	5
Tomatoes, canned whole	1 cup	240	50	2	9	1	t	0
Raw, 2 by 2 1/2	1 med.	150	30	1	6	0.6	t	0
Tomato juice, canned	1 cup	240	50	2	10	0.6	t	0
Tomato catsup	1 T.	17	15	t	4	t	t	0
Turnip greens, steamed	1 cup	145	45	4	8	1.8	1	0
Turnips, steamed, sliced	1 cup	155	40	1	9	1.8	t	0
Watercress, leaves and								
stems, raw	1 cup	50	9	1	1	0.3	t	0

== Fruits ==
Fruits A-F
Food	Measure	Grams	Calories	Protein	Carb	Fiber	Fat	Sat_fat
Apple juice, fresh or								
canned	1 cup	250	125	t	34	0	0	0
Apple cider vinegar	1/3 cup	100	14	t	3	0	0	0
Apples, raw	1 med	130	70	t	18	1	t	0
Stewed or canned	1 cup	240	100	t	26	2	t	0
Apricots, canned In syrup	1 cup	250	220	2	57	1	t	0
Dried, uncooked	1/2 cup	75	220	4	50	1	t	0
Fresh	3 med.	114	55	1	14	0.70	t	0
Nectar, or juice	1 cup	250	140	1	36	2	t	0
Avocado	1/2 large	108	185	2	6	1.80	18	12
Banana	1 med.	150	85	1	23	0.9	t	0
Blackberries, fresh	1 cup	144	85	2	19	6.60	1	0
Blueberries, canned	1 cup	250	245	1	65	2	t	0
Cantaloupe	1/2 med.	380	40	1	9	2.20	t	0
Cherries, canned, pitted	1 cup	257	100	2	26	2	1	0
Fresh, raw	1 cup	114	65	1	15	0.8	t	0
Cranberry sauce,								
sweetened	1 cup	277	530	t	142	1.2	t	0
Dates, dried	1 cup	178	505	4	134	3.6	t	0
Figs, dried, large, 2" by 1"	2	42	120	2	30	1.9	t	0
Fresh, raw	3 med.	114	90	2	22	1	t	0
Stewed or canned								
with syrup	3	115	130	1	32	1	t	0
Fruit cocktail, canned	1 cup	256	195	1	50	0.5	t	0

Fruits G-O
Food	Measure	Grams	Calories	Protein	Carb	Fiber	Fat	Sat_fat
Grapefruit, canned								
sections	1 cup	250	170	1	44	0.5	t	0
Grapefruit, fresh,								
5" diameter	1/2	285	50	1	14	1	t	t
Grapefruit juice	1 cup	250	100	1	24	1	t	0
Grapes, American, as								
Concord	1 cup	153	70	1	16	0.8	t	0
European, as Muscat, Tokay	1 cup	160	100	1	26	0.7	t	0
Grape juice, bottled	1 cup	250	160	1	42	t	t	0
Lemon juice, fresh	1/2 cup	125	30	t	10	t	t	0
Lemonade concentrate,								
frozen	6-oz. can	220	430	t	112	t	t	0
Limeade concentrate								
frozen	6-oz. can	218	405	t	108	t	t	0
Olives, green, canned								
large	10	65	72	1	3	0.8	10	9
Ripe, canned, large	10	65	105	1	1	1	13	12
Oranges, fresh,								
3" diameter	1 med.	180	60	2	16	1	t	t
Orange juice, fresh	8 oz. or	250	112	2	25	0.2	t	0
Frozen concentrate	6-oz. can	210	330	2	78	0.4	t	t

Fruits P-Z
Food	Measure	Grams	Calories	Protein	Carb	Fiber	Fat	Sat_fat
Papaya, fresh	1/2 med.	200	75	1	18	1.8	t	0
Peaches, canned, sliced	1 cup	257	200	1	52	1	t	0
Fresh, raw	1 med.	114	35	1	10	0.6	t	0
Pears, canned, sweetened	1 cup	255	195	1	50	2	t	0
Raw, 3 by 2V	1 med.	182	100	1	25	2	1	0
Persimmons, Japanese	1 med.	125	75	1	20	2	t	0
Pineapple, canned, sliced	1 large slice	122	95	t	26	0.4	t	0
Crushed	1 cup	260	205	1	55	0.7	t	0
Raw, diced	1 cup	140	75	1	19	0.6	t'	0
Pineapple juice, canned	1 cup	250	120	1	32	0.2	t	0
Plums, canned in syrup	1 cup	256	185	1	50	0.7	t	0
Raw, 2" diameter	1	60	30	t	7	0.2	t	0
Prunes, cooked	1 cup	270	300	3	81	0.8	1	0
Prune juice, canned*	1 cup	240	170	1	45	0.7	t	0
Raisins, dried	1/2 cup	88	230	2	82	0.7	t	0
Raspberries, frozen	1/2 cup	100	100	t	25	2	t	0
Raw, red	3/4 cup	100	57	t	14	5	t	0
Rhubarb, cooked,								
sweetened	1 cup	270	385	1	98	1.9	t	0
Strawberries, frozen	1 cup	227	242	1	60	1.3	t	0
Raw	1 cup	149	54	t	12	1.9	t	0
Tangerines, fresh	I med.	114	40	1	10	1	t	0
Watermelon, 4 by 8"	1 wedge	925	120	2	29	3.6	1	0

== Breads, cereals and grains ==
Breads, cereals, and grains A-O
Food	Measure	Grams	Calories	Protein	Carb	Fiber	Fat	Sat_fat
Biscuits, 2 1/2" diameters	1	38	130	3	18	t	4	3
Bran flakes	1 cup	25	117	3	32	0.10	t	0
Bread, cracked wheat	1 slice	23	60	2	12	0.10	1	1
Rye	1 slice	23	55	2	12	0.10	1	1
White, 20 slices, or	1-lb. loaf	454	1,225	39	229	9.00	15	12
Whole-wheat	1-lb. loaf	454	1,100	48	216	67.50	14	10
Whole-wheat	1 slice	23	55	2	11	0.31	1	0
Corn bread of whole								
ground meal	1 serving	50	100	3	15	0.30	4	2
Cornflakes	1 cup	25	110	2	25	0.1	t	0
Corn grits, refined,								
cooked	1 cup	242	120	8	27	0.2	t	0
Corn meal, yellow	1 cup	118	360	9	74	1.6	4	2
Crackers, graham	2 med.	14	55	1	10	t	1	0
Soda, 2 1/2 square	2	11	45	1	8	t	1	0
Farina	1 cup	238	105	3	22	8	t	0
Flour, soy, full fat	1 cup	110	460	39	33	2.9	22	0
Wheat (all purpose)	1 cup	110	400	12	84	0.3	1	0
Wheat (whole)	1 cup	120	390	13	79	2.8	2	0
Macaroni, cooked	1 cup	140	155	5	32	0.1	1	0
Baked with cheese	1 cup	220	475	18	44	t	25	24
Muffins of refined flour	1	48	135	4	19	t	5	4
Noodles	1 cup	160	200	7	37	0.1	2	2
Oatmeal, or rolled oats	1 cup	236	150	5	26	4.6	3	2

Breads, cereals, and grains P-Z
Food	Measure	Grams	Calories	Protein	Carb	Fiber	Fat	Sat_fat
Pancakes, buckwheat,								
4" diam.	4	108	250	7	28	0.1	9	0
Wheat, refined flour,								
4" diam.	4	108	250	7	28	0.1	9	0
Pizza, cheese, 1/8 of								
14" diam.	1 section	75	180	8	23	t	6	5
Popcorn, with oil and								
salt	2 cups	28	152	3	20	0.5	7	2
Puffed rice	1 cup	14	55	t	12	t	t	0
Puffed wheat,								
presweetened	1 cup	28	105	1	26	0.6	t	0
Rice, uncooked, brown	1 cup	208	748	15	154	1.2	3	0
Converted	1 cup	187	677	14	142	0.4	t	0
White	1 cup	191	692	4.2	150	0.3	t	0
Rice flakes	1 cup	30	115	2	26	0.1	t	0
Rice polish	1/2 cup	50	132	6	28	1.2	6	0
Rolls, breakfast, sweet	1 large	50	411	3	23	0.1	12	11
of refined flour	1	38	115	3	20	t	2	2
whole-wheat	1	40	102	4	20	0.1	1	0
Spaghetti with meat sauce	1 cup	250	285	13	35	0.50	10	6
with tomatoes and cheese	1 cup	250	210	6	36	0.50	5	3
Spanish rice with meat	1 cup	250	217	4	40	1.20	4	0
Shredded wheat biscuit	1	28	100	3	23	0.70	1	0
Waffles, 1/2" x 4 1/2" x 5 1/2"	1	75	240	8	30	0.10	9	1
Wheat germ	1 cup	68	245	17	34	2.50	7	3
Wheat germ cereal,								
toasted	1 cup	65	260	20	36	2.50	7	3
Wheat-meal cereal,								
unrefined	3/4 cup	30	103	4	25	0.70	1	0
Wheat, unground,								
cooked	3/4 cup	200	275	12	35	4.40	1	0

== Soups: canned and diluted ==
Soups: canned and diluted
Food	Measure	Grams	Calories	Protein	Carb	Fiber	Fat	Sat_fat
Bean soups	1 cup	250	190	8	30	0.60	5	4
Beef and vegetable	1 cup	250	100	6	11	0.50	4	4
Bouillon, broth, consommé	1 cup	240	24	5	0	0	0	0
chicken or turkey	1 cup	250	75	4	10	0	2	2
Clam chowder, without milk	1 cup	255	85	5	12	0.50	2	8
Cream soups (asparagus, celery, etc.)	1 cup	255	200	7	18	1.20	12	11
Noodle, rice, barley	1 cup	250	115	6	13	0.20	4	3
Split pea soup	1 cup	250	147	8	25	0.50	3	3
Tomato soup, diluted w/milk	1 cup	245	175	6	22	0.50	7	6
Vegetable (vegetarian)	1 cup	250	80	4	14	0	2	2

== Desserts and sweets ==
Desserts and sweets
Food	Measure	Grams	Calories	Protein	Carb	Fiber	Fat	Sat_fat
Apple betty	1 serving	100	150	1	29	0.5	4	0
Bread pudding with raisins	3/4 cup	200	374	11	56	0.20	12	11
Cakes, angel food	1 slice	40	110	3	23	0	t	0
Chocolate fudge w/ icing	1 slice	120	420	5	70	0.3	14	12
Cupcake with icing	1	50	160	3	31	t	3	2
Fruit cake, 2" x 2" x 4"	1 slice	30	105	2	17	0.2	4	3
Gingerbread, 2" cube	1 slice	55	180	2	28	t	7	6
Plain, with no icing	1 slice	55	180	4	31	t	5	4
Sponge cake, no icing	1 slice	40	115	3	22	0	2	2
Candy, caramels	5	25	104	t	19	0	3	3
Chocolate cream	2	30	130	t	24	0	4	4
Fudge, plain, 1" x 1"	2 pieces	90	370	t	80	0.1	12	11
Hard candies	1 oz.	28	90	t	28	0	0	0
Marshmallows, large	5	30	98	1	23	0	0	0
Milk chocolate	2-oz. bar	56	290	2	44	0.2	6	6
Chocolate syrup	2 T.	40	80	t	22	0	t	t
Doughnuts, cake type	1	33	135	2	17	t	7	4
Gelatin, made with water	1 cup	239	155	4	36	0	t	t
Honey, strained honey, strained	2 T.	42	120	t	30	0	0	0
Ice cream, see								
Dairy products								
Ices, lime, orange, etc.	1 cup	150	117	0	48	0	0	0
Jams, marmalades,								
preserves	1 T.	20	55	0	14	t	0	0
Jellies	1 T.	20	50	0	13	0	0	0
Molasses, blackstrap	1 T.	20	45	0	11	8	0	0
Cane, refined	1 T.	20	50	0	13	0	0	0
Pie, apple, 1/2 of								
9" diam. pie	1 slice	135	330	3	53	0.1	13	11
Cherry	1 slice	135	340	3	55	0.1	13	11
Custard	1 slice	130	265	7	34	0	11	10
Lemon meringue	1 slice	120	300	4	45	0.1	12	10
Mince	1 slice	135	340	3	62	0.70	9	8
Pumpkin	1 slice	130	265	5	34	8	12	11
Puddings (see Dairy products)								
Sugar, beet or cane	1 cup	200	770	0	199	0	0	0
3 teaspoons or	1 T.	12	50	0	12	0	0	0
Brown, firm-packed, dark	1 cup	220	815	0	210	0		0
Syrup, maple	2 T.	40	100	0	25	0	0	0
table blends	2 T.	40	110	0	29	0	0	0
Tapioca cream pudding	1 cup	250	335	10	42	0	10	9

== Nuts and seeds ==
Nuts and seeds
Food	Measure	Grams	Calories	Protein	Carb	Fiber	Fat	Sat_fat
Almonds, dried	1/2 cup	70	425	13	13	1.8	38	28
roasted and salted	1/2 cup	70	439	13	13	1.8	40	31
Brazil nuts; unsalted	1/2 cup	70	457	10	7	2	47	31
Cashews, unsalted	1/2 cup	70	392	12	20	0.9	32	28
Coconut, shredded,								
sweetened	1/2 cup	50	274	1	26	2	20	19
unsweetened	1/2 cup	50	357	3.5	14.5	10.5	30.5	30.5
Peanut butter, natural	1/3 cup	50	284	13	8	0.9	24	10
Peanuts, roasted	1/3 cup	50	290	13	9	1.2	25	16
Pecans, raw, halves	1/2 cup	52	343	5	7	1.1	35	25
Sesame seeds, dry	1/2 cup	50	280	9	10	3.1	24	13
Sunflower seeds	1/2 cup	50	280	12	10	1.9	26	7
Walnuts, English, raw	1/2 cup	50	325	7	8	1	32	7

== Beverages ==
Beverages
Food	Measure	Grams	Calories	Protein	Carb	Fiber	Fat	Sat_fat
Alcoholic								
Beer (4% alcohol)	2 cups	480	228	t	8	0	0	0
Gin, rum, vodka, whiskey (86 proof)	1 oz.	28	70	0	t	0	0	0
Wines, dessert (I 8.8% alcohol)	1/2 cup	120	164	t	9	0	0	0
Table (12.2% alcohol)	1/2 cup	120	100	t	5	0	0	0
Carbonated drinks								
Artificially sweetened	12 oz.	346	0	0	0	0	0	0
Club soda	12 oz.	346	0	0	0	0	0	0
Cola drinks, sweetened	12 oz.	346	137	0	38	0	0	0
Fruit-flavored soda	12 oz.	346	161	0	42	0	0	0
Ginger ale	12 oz.	346	105	0	28	0	0	0
Root beer	12 oz.	346	140	0	35	0	0	0
Coffee, black, unsweetened	1 cup	230	3	t	1	0	0	0
Tea, clear, unsweetened	1 cup	230	4	0	1	0	t	0

== See also ==
- Food energy
- Food groups
- Nutrient contents of common foods
- Food labels
- Healthy diet
- Nutrition
- Human nutrition
