= Jerold Mande =

American nutritionist and civil servant

Jerold R. Mande
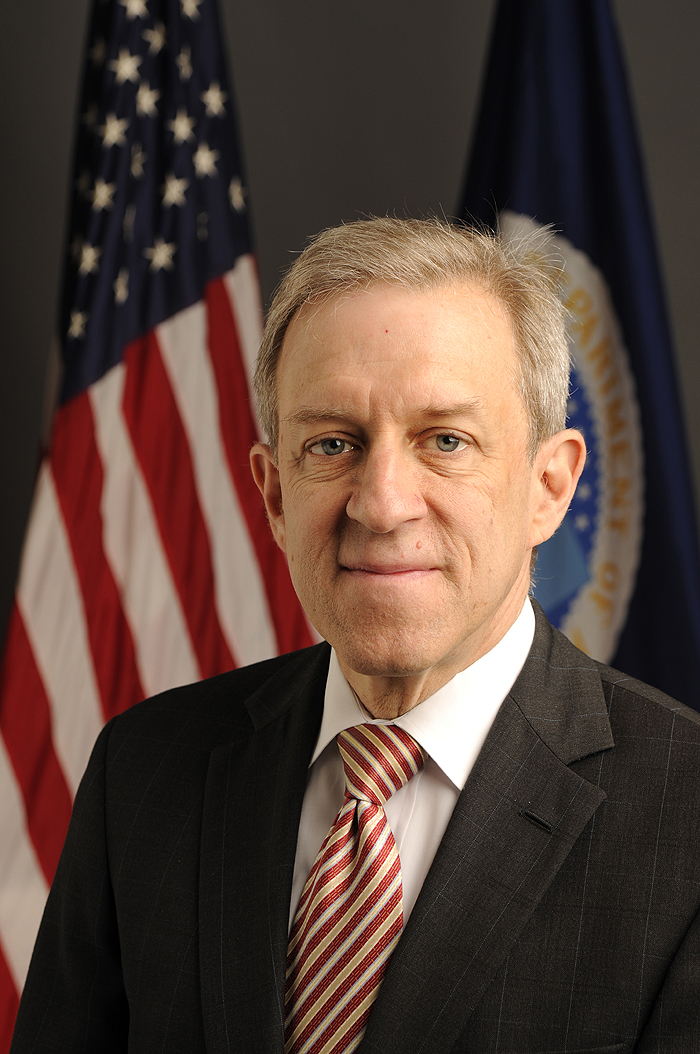
- Mande in 2009
- Born: January 20, 1954 (age 72); Westport, Connecticut, US
- Education: University of Connecticut (BS); University of North Carolina at Chapel Hill (MPH)
- Occupations: Nutritionist, public policy expert, civil servant
- Employer(s): USDA, FDA, OSHA, Yale University, Tufts University

Jerold Robert Mande (born January 20, 1954) is an American nutritionist, public policy expert, and civil servant who served as Deputy Under Secretary for Food Safety at the US Department of Agriculture, in charge of the Food Safety and Inspection Service, from 2009 to 2011. He has held numerous other senior positions in executive branch agencies and universities.

== Life and education ==
Mande earned a BS in nutritional sciences from the University of Connecticut in 1978 and a MPH in nutrition and epidemiology from the University of North Carolina at Chapel Hill in 1983. He completed the program for senior government managers at Harvard Kennedy School in 1989. He is married to pediatrician and health policy expert Elizabeth Drye and has two sons, Matthew and Thomas. Mande was raised in Westport, Connecticut, and lives in Hamden, Connecticut as of 2011.

== Career ==
Mande began his career as a health and environmental legislative assistant to Al Gore in the US House and Senate from 1981 to 1991, developing Gore's strategy for organ donations. During the Bill Clinton presidency, Mande served as senior adviser and executive assistant to the Commissioner of the Food and Drug Administration (FDA) from 1991 to 1997, Senior Advisor to the Assistant to the President for Science and Technology from 1997 to 1998, and Deputy Assistant Secretary of the Occupational Safety and Health Administration (OSHA) from 1999 to 2000. At the FDA, he supervised tobacco regulation and led the design of the Nutrition Facts food label, receiving the Presidential Award for Design Excellence in 1997.

During the George W. Bush presidency, Mande worked as a vice president for Health Dialog from 2000 to 2002 before entering academia, where he started out as director of policy programs at the Yale School of Medicine. He was a lecturer and clinical professor in public health and food policy and capped his Yale career in 2009 as associate director for public policy at the Yale Cancer Center. During the Barack Obama presidency, he returned to government, serving as Acting Under Secretary for Food Safety (2009–2010), Deputy Under Secretary for Food Safety (2009–2011), and Senior Advisor for Food Nutritiion, and Consumer Services (2011–2017). As senior advisor, he spent six years working to improve health outcomes of the Supplemental Nutrition Assistance Program, National School Lunch Program, WIC, and other programs.

Mande returned to academia as professor of practice at Tufts University from 2017 to 2020. He led the 50th Anniversary of the White House Conference on Food, Nutrition, and Health. In 2020, he became a senior advisor to the president of the Center for Science in the Public Interest. He is a non-resident senior fellow at Tufts University's Jonathan M. Tisch College of Civic Life and an adjunct professor of nutrition at Harvard University's T.H. Chan School of Public Health.

In 2022, Mande launched Nourish Science with Jerome Adams, Bill Frist, and Thomas Grumbly to ensure every child reaches age 18 at a healthy weight and in good metabolic health by increasing federal support for nutrition research, rejuvenating FDA food regulation, and modernizing SNAP to improve food security and diet quality.

Mande received the University of Connecticut Alumni Association's Distinguished Alumni Award in 2011. and gave the UConn College of Agriculture, Health, & Natural Resources commencement address in 2010 and 2024.
