= Dietary Reference Intake =

US system of nutrition recommendations

The Dietary Reference Intake (DRI) is a system of nutrition recommendations from the National Academy of Medicine (NAM) (Note: formerly the Institute of Medicine (IoM)) of the National Academies (United States). It was introduced in 1997 in order to broaden the existing guidelines known as Recommended Dietary Allowances (RDAs, see below). The DRI values differ from those used in nutrition labeling on food and dietary supplement products in the U.S. and Canada, which uses Reference Daily Intakes (RDIs) and Daily Values (%DV) which were based on outdated RDAs from 1968 but were updated as of 2016.

== Parameters ==
Dietary reference intakes

DRI provides several different types of reference values:

- Estimated Average Requirements (EAR), are expected to satisfy the needs of 50% of the people in that age group based on a review of the scientific literature.
- Recommended Dietary Allowances (RDA), the daily dietary intake level of a nutrient considered sufficient by the Food and Nutrition Board of the Institute of Medicine to meet the requirements of 97.5% of healthy individuals in each life stage and sex group. The definition implies that the intake level would cause a harmful nutrient deficiency in just 2.5%. It is calculated based on the EAR and is usually approximately 20% higher than the EAR (See Calculating the RDA).
- Adequate Intake (AI), where no RDA has been established, but the amount established is somewhat less firmly believed to be adequate for everyone in the demographic group.
- Tolerable upper intake levels (UL), to caution against excessive intake of nutrients (like vitamin A and selenium) that can be harmful in large amounts. This is the highest level of sustained daily nutrient consumption that is considered to be safe for, and cause no side effects in, 97.5% of healthy individuals in each life stage and sex group. The definition implies that the intake level would cause a harmful nutrient excess in just 2.5%. The European Food Safety Authority (EFSA) has also established ULs which do not always agree with U.S. ULs. For example, adult zinc UL is 40 mg in the U.S. and 25 mg in EFSA.
- Acceptable Macronutrient Distribution Ranges (AMDR), are a range of intake specified as a percentage of total energy intake. Used for sources of energy, such as fats and carbohydrates.

DRIs are used by both the United States and Canada, and are intended for the general public and health professionals. Applications include:

- Composition of diets for schools, prisons, hospitals or nursing homes
- Industries developing new foods and dietary supplements
- Healthcare policy makers and public health officials

== Other countries ==
The European Food Safety Authority (EFSA) refers to the collective set of information as Dietary Reference Values, with Population Reference Intake (PRI) instead of RDA, and Average Requirement instead of EAR. AI and UL define the same as in the United States, although numerical values may differ.

Australia and New Zealand refer to the collective set of information as Nutrient Reference Values, with Recommended Dietary Intake (RDI) instead of RDA, but EAR, AI and UL defined the same as in the United States and Canada, although numerical values may differ.

== History ==
The recommended dietary allowance (RDA) was developed during World War II by Lydia J. Roberts, Hazel Stiebeling, and Helen S. Mitchell, all part of a committee established by the United States National Academy of Sciences in order to investigate issues of nutrition that might "affect national defense".

The committee was renamed the Food and Nutrition Board in 1941, after which they began to deliberate on a set of recommendations of a standard daily allowance for each type of nutrient. The standards would be used for nutrition recommendations for the armed forces, for civilians, and for overseas population who might need food relief. Roberts, Stiebeling, and Mitchell surveyed all available data, created a tentative set of allowances for "energy and eight nutrients", and submitted them to experts for review (Nestle, 35).

The final set of guidelines, called RDAs for Recommended Dietary Allowances, were accepted in 1941. The allowances were meant to provide superior nutrition for civilians and military personnel, so they included a "margin of safety". Because of food rationing during the war, the food guides created by government agencies to direct citizens' nutritional intake also took food availability into account.

The Food and Nutrition Board subsequently revised the RDAs every five to ten years. In the early 1950s, United States Department of Agriculture nutritionists made a new set of guidelines that also included the number of servings of each food group in order to make it easier for people to receive their RDAs of each nutrient.

The DRI was introduced in 1997 in order to broaden the existing system of RDAs. DRIs were published over the period 1998 to 2001. In 2011, revised DRIs were published for calcium and vitamin D. Additionally, revised DRIs were published for potassium and sodium in 2019. The DRI for energy was updated in 2023. None of the other DRIs have been revised since first published 1998 to 2001.

== Current recommendations for United States and Canada ==
Highest EARs and RDA/AIs and lowest ULs for people ages nine years and older, except pregnant or lactating women. ULs for younger children may be lower than RDA/AIs for older people. Females need more iron than males and generally need more nutrients when pregnant or lactating.

=== Vitamins and choline ===
Nutrient	Highest EAR	Highest RDA/AI		Lowest UL	Unit	Top common sources, 100 grams, U.S. Department of Agriculture (USDA)
Nutrient	Highest EAR	Males	Females	Lowest UL	Unit	Top common sources, 100 grams, U.S. Department of Agriculture (USDA)
Vitamin A	630	900	700 (Note: 1300 for pregnant or lactating women)	1700 (Note: 600 for children aged 8 years and younger)	μg	cod liver oil, liver, dehydrated red sweet peppers, veal, dehydrated carrots
Thiamin (B_{1})	1.0	1.2	1.1 (Note: 1.4 for pregnant or lactating women)	ND	mg	fortified breakfast cereals, energy bars, and baby food products
Riboflavin (B_{2})	1.1	1.3	1.1 (Note: 1.6 for pregnant or lactating women)	ND	mg	fortified food products, lamb liver, spirulina
Niacin (B_{3})	12	16	14 (Note: 18 for pregnant or lactating women)	20 (Note: 10 for children aged 8 years and younger)	mg	fortified food products, baker's yeast, rice bran, instant coffee, fortified beverages
Pantothenic acid (B_{5})	NE	5	5 (Note: 7 for pregnant or lactating women)	ND	mg	fortified food and beverage products, dried shiitake mushrooms, beef liver, rice bran
Vitamin B_{6}	1.4	1.7	1.5 (Note: 2.0 for pregnant or lactating women)	60	mg	fortified food and beverage products, rice bran, fortified margarines, ground sage
Biotin (B_{7})	NE	30	30 (Note: 35 for lactating women)	ND	μg	organ meats, eggs, fish, meat, seeds, nuts
Folate (B_{9})	330	400	400 (Note: 600 for pregnant or lactating women)	600 (Note: 300 for children aged 8 years and younger)	μg	baker's yeast, fortified food and beverage products, poultry liver
Cobalamin (B_{12})	2.0	2.4	2.4 (Note: 2.8 for pregnant or lactating women)	ND	μg	shellfish, beef, animal liver, fortified food and beverage products
Vitamin C	75	90	75 (Note: 120 for pregnant or lactating women)	1200	mg	fortified beverages, dried sweet peppers, raw acerola, dried chives and coriander, rose hips, fortified food products
Vitamin D	10	20	20	100	μg	cod liver oil, mushrooms (if exposed to ultraviolet light), halibut, mackerel, canned sockeye salmon
α-tocopherol (Vitamin E)	12	15	15 (Note: 19 for lactating women)	600	mg	wheat germ oil, fortified food and beverage products, hazelnut oil, fortified peanut butter, chili powder
Vitamin K	NE	120	90	ND	μg	dried spices, fresh parsley, cooked and raw kale, chard, other leaf vegetables
Choline	NE	550	425 (Note: 550 for pregnant or lactating women)	2000	mg	egg yolk, organ meats from beef and pork, soybean oil, fish roe

=== Minerals ===
Nutrient	Highest EAR	Highest RDA/AI		Lowest UL	Unit	Top common sources, 100 grams, U.S. Department of Agriculture (USDA)
Nutrient	Highest EAR	Males	Females	Lowest UL	Unit	Top common sources, 100 grams, U.S. Department of Agriculture (USDA)
Calcium	1100	1300	1300	2000	mg	fortified cereals, beverages, tofu, energy bars, and baby foods, dried basil and other spices, dried whey, cheese, milk powder
Chloride	NE	2300	2300	3400	mg	table salt
Chromium	NE	35	25 (Note: 45 for pregnant or lactating women)	ND	μg	broccoli, turkey ham, dried apricots, tuna, pineapple, grape juice
Copper	700	900	900 (Note: 1300 for pregnant or lactating women)	5000	μg	animal liver, seaweed products, dried shiitake mushrooms, oysters, sesame seeds, cocoa powder, cashews, sunflower seeds
Fluoride	NE	4	3	10 (Note: 0.7 for children aged 3 years and younger, 2.2 for children aged 4-8 years)	mg	public drinking water, where fluoridation is performed or natural fluorides are present, tea, raisins
Iodine	95	150	150 (Note: 290 for pregnant or lactating women)	600	μg	iodized salt, kelp, cod
Iron	8.1	11	18 (Note: 27 for pregnant women)	40	mg	dried thyme and other spices, fortified foods, including baby foods, animal organ meats
Magnesium	350	420	360 (Note: 400 for pregnant or lactating women)	350 (Note: Specific to consuming more than this amount all at once, in the form of a dietary supplement, as this may cause diarrhea. Magnesium-rich foods do not cause this problem. 65 for children aged 3 and younger, 110 for children aged 4-8 years.)	mg	crude rice bran, cottonseed flour, hemp seeds, dried spices, cocoa powder, fortified beverages
Manganese	NE	2.3	1.8 (Note: 2.6 for pregnant or lactating women)	6 (Note: 2 for children aged 8 years and younger)	mg	fortified beverages and infant formulas, ground cloves and other dried spices, chickpeas, fortified breakfast cereals
Molybdenum	34	45	45 (Note: 50 for pregnant or lactating women)	1100	μg	legumes, grain products, nuts and seeds
Phosphorus	1055	1250	1250	3000	mg	baking powder, instant pudding, cottonseed meal, hemp seeds, fortified beverages, dried whey
Potassium	NE	3400	2600 (Note: 2900 for pregnant or lactating women)	ND	mg	Potatoes, bananas, kiwifruit, prunes, raisins, sunflower seeds, watermelon, avocado, spinach, baking powder, dried parsley and other spices, cocoa powder, instant tea and instant coffee, dried tomatoes, dried sweet peppers, soy sauce
Selenium	45	55	55 (Note: 70 for pregnant or lactating women)	280 (Note: 45 for children aged 8 years and younger)	μg	Brazil nuts and mixed nuts, animal kidneys, dried eggs, oysters, dried cod
Sodium	NE	1500	1500	1800 (Note: The UL for sodium toxicity is not established; however, the lowest Chronic Disease Risk Reduction Intake (CDRR) for sodium is 1800 mg for people ages 9 and up. 1200 for children aged 8 years and younger.)	mg	table salt, baking soda, soup bouillon cube, seasoning mixes, onion soup mix, fish sauce
Zinc	9.4	11	9 (Note: 13 for pregnant or lactating women)	40 (Note: 4 for children aged 3 years and younger)	mg	oysters, fortified breakfast cereals, baby foods, beverages, peanut butter, and energy bars, wheat germ

NE: EARs have not yet been established or not yet evaluated; ND: ULs could not be determined, and it is recommended that intake from these nutrients be from food only, to prevent adverse effects.

It is also recommended that the following substances not be added to food or dietary supplements. Research has been conducted into adverse effects, but was not conclusive in many cases:

Substance	Lowest UL	units per day
Arsenic	ND	—
Boron	11	mg
Nickel	0.6	mg
Silicon	ND	—
Vanadium	1.8	mg

=== Macronutrients ===
RDA/AI is shown below for males and females aged 19–50 years.

Substance	Amount (males)	Amount (females)	Top Sources in Common Measures
Water (Note: equal to median intakes and includes water from solid food)	3.7 L/day	2.7 L/day	water, watermelon, iceberg lettuce, fruits and vegetables
Carbohydrates	45–65% of calories (Note: Acceptable Macronutrient Distribution Range (AMDR).)		milk, grains, fruits, vegetables
Carbohydrates	130 g/day (Note: based on the average minimum glucose used by the brain, which is similar to the amount that has a maximum protein sparing effect and to the amount derived from nitrogen balance)		milk, grains, fruits, vegetables
Protein	10–35% of calories		Nuts, seeds legumes (pulses: beans, peas, lentils). Animal sources: Meats, fish, milk, cheeses, eggs
Protein	56 g/day (Note: Based on 0.8 g/kg of body weight (RDA).)	46 g/day	Nuts, seeds legumes (pulses: beans, peas, lentils). Animal sources: Meats, fish, milk, cheeses, eggs
Fiber	14 g/(1000 kcal)		barley, bulgur, rolled oats, legumes, psyllium, nuts, beans, apples
Fiber	38 g/day (Note: using a median intake of 2,718 kcal for men 19 to 30 years of age)	25 g/day (Note: using a median intake of 1,757 kcal for women 19 to 30 years of age)	barley, bulgur, rolled oats, legumes, psyllium, nuts, beans, apples
Fat	20–35% of calories		Vegetable oils, butter, lard, nuts, seeds, fatty meat cuts, egg yolk, cheeses
Linoleic acid, an omega-6 fatty acid (polyunsaturated) (A type of fat)	17 g/day	12 g/day	Vegetable oils (Hemp oil (seed), sunflower oil (seed), corn oil (maize), canola oil)
alpha-Linolenic acid, an omega-3 fatty acid (polyunsaturated) (A type of fat)	1.6 g/day	1.1 g/day	Vegetable oils: (Linseed oil (flax seed), hemp oil (seed), canola oil), chia seed, hemp seed, walnut, soybeans
Trans fatty acids (A type of fat)	As low as possible		Partially hydrogenated fat, margarine
Saturated fatty acids (A type of fat)	As low as possible while consuming a nutritionally adequate diet		Animal fat (dairy products), fully hydrogenated fat, coconut oil (meat), cocoa butter, palm oil
Added sugar (A type of carbohydrate)	Less than 10% of calories		non-natural sweet foods: Candy, sweetened beverages, cookies, cakes, jams, syrup, many processed foods

== Calculating the RDA ==
The equations used to calculate the RDA are as follows:

"If the standard deviation (SD) of the EAR is available and the requirement for the nutrient is symmetrically distributed, the RDA is set of two SDs above the EAR:

$RDA = EAR + 2SD(EAR)$

If data about variability in requirements are insufficient to calculate an SD, a coefficient of variation (CV) for the EAR of 10 percent is assumed, unless available data indicate a greater variation in requirements. If 10 percent is assumed to be the CV, then twice that amount when added to the EAR is defined as equal to the RDA. The resulting equation for the RDA is then

$RDA = 1.2EAR$

This level of intake statistically represents 97.5 percent of the requirements of the population."

== Standard of evidence ==
In September 2007, the Institute of Medicine held a workshop entitled "The Development of DRIs 1994–2004: Lessons Learned and New Challenges". At that meeting, several speakers stated that the current Dietary Recommended Intakes (DRI's) were largely based upon the very lowest rank in the quality of evidence pyramid, that is, opinion, rather than the highest level – randomized controlled clinical trials. Speakers called for a higher standard of evidence to be utilized when making dietary recommendations. The only DRIs to have been revised since that meeting until 2011 are vitamin D and calcium.

== Adherence ==
Percent of U.S. population ages 2+ meeting EAR or USDA healthy eating patterns in 2004

Nutrient	Adherence
Protein	88.9%
Vitamin A	46.0%
Vitamin C	51.0%
Vitamin E	13.6%
Thiamin	81.6%
Riboflavin	89.1%
Niacin	87.2%
Vitamin B_{6}	73.9%
Folate	59.6%
Vitamin B_{12}	79.7%
Phosphorus	87.2%
Magnesium	43.0%
Iron	89.5%
Selenium	91.5%
Zinc	70.8%
Copper	84.2%
Calcium	30.9%
Fiber	8.0%
Potassium	7.6%
% calories from total fat ≤ 35%	59.4%
% calories from saturated fat < 10%	55.8%
Cholesterol intake < 300 mg	10.4%
Sodium intake ≤ 2,300 mg	29.8%

== See also ==
- Acceptable daily intake
- Canada's Food Guide
- Dietary Reference Values – EU/UK system of nutritional advice
- Mineral (nutrient)
- Essential amino acid
- Essential fatty acid
- Essential nutrient
- Food composition
- Food pyramid (nutrition)
- Healthy diet
- Protein quality
- Reference Daily Intake – US/Canada food nutrient labelling system
- Reference Intake – EU/UK food nutrient labelling system
- Therapeutic food#Composition
- Hypervitaminosis – vitamin toxicity
