= Guideline Daily Amount =

Former UK and EU food labelling system

A Guideline Daily Amount (GDA) was a nutrition facts label originally designed in 1996 in the United Kingdom (UK) as a collaboration between the government, the food industry and consumer organisations. GDAs appeared on the front and back of food packaging to help raise awareness of how much a food item represents as a proportion of a balanced intake each day in each food element (e.g. energy, fat, salt, etc.). The British initiative was followed in the European Union (EU) and influenced similar systems in other countries including the United States.

It is now replaced by Reference Intake (RI) in the UK and the EU.

== Description and usage ==
GDAs are guidelines for healthy adults and children about the approximate amount of calories, fat, saturated fat, total sugars, and sodium/salt they should consume each day. The GDA labels have the percentage of daily value per serving and the absolute amount per serving of these categories. The front-of-packages (FOP) GDAs must at least have calories listed, but the back-of-package (BOP) GDAs must list, at a minimum, these five key nutrients: Energy, Fat, Saturates, Sugar and Salt. These guideline are intended to help consumers make sense of the nutrition information provided on food labels by translating science into consumer friendly information that help consumers put the nutrition information they read on a food label into the context of their overall diet.

The system was designed in the United Kingdom in 1996 as a collaboration between the government, the food industry and consumer organisations. The term was in common usage in the UK since the late 1990s. The British system was followed in the United States to enhance the existing food labelling. A modified version of the GDA system was adopted by the Australian food and beverage industry in 2006 and called the 'Daily Intake Guide'. In 2009 the original GDA system analysis as adopted as an industry standard in the European Union and in 2012 a variant was adopted in the US and called 'Facts Up Front'.

After introduction outside the UK, there was controversy about what the GDAs actually represent. For example, calculating a personal R.I., which is dependent on a person's height, weight, amount of daily activity and age, an intake rating which is about 5-10% above what that person should actually be eating and drinking. When calculating the GDAs the CIAA uses the average caloric intake needed for women because this best fits the needs of the majority of the population. Women need, on average, 1800–2200 kilocalories (kcal) a day whereas children need 1500–2000 kcal and men 2200–2700 kcal. In March 2009, the European Food Safety Authority published its opinion on intake levels for Europe and they were consistent with numbers behind the GDAs developed in the UK.

Moreover, not all categories are equal. While a GDA for calorific intake might represent a broad target in so far as people need to take in a minimum of calories to survive, the GDA for saturated fat is not a target, as ingesting no saturated fats at all would not be harmful to health, so long as there were fats of a non-saturated variety in the diet.

== Replacement ==
In 2014, GDA was beginning to be replaced in the UK and EU by Reference Intake.

== See also ==
- Dietary Reference Values
- Food Standards Agency
- List of food labeling regulations
- Traffic light label
- United Kingdom food information regulations
