= Dietary Reference Value =

EU/UK system of nutritional advice

Dietary Reference Values (DRV) is the name of the nutritional requirements systems used by the United Kingdom Department of Health and the European Union's European Food Safety Authority.

== History ==
=== Introduction in the United Kingdom ===
In 1991, the United Kingdom Department of Health published the Dietary Reference Values for Food Energy and Nutrients for the United Kingdom. This records Dietary Reference Values which recommended nutritional intakes for the UK population. The DRVs can be divided into three types:

- RNI - Reference Nutrient Intake (95% of the population's requirement is met)
- EAR - Estimated Average Requirement (50% of the population's requirement is met)
- LRNI - Lower Recommended Nutritional Intake (5% of the population's requirement is met)

RNI is not the same as RDA (Recommended Daily Allowance) or GDA, although they are often similar.

=== Extension to European Union ===
In 2009, the European Food Safety Authority (EFSA) began public consultations drafting Dietary Reference Values (DRVs) for macronutrients. EFSA published several DRV scientific opinions in March 2010. The European Food Safety Authority also intends to extend Dietary Reference Values to the EU level. EFSA provides independent scientific advice to support EU policies on food safety and nutrition, and acts as watchdog inside the European market in order to establish a common ground on food safety requirements and nutrition as well.

EFSA met in September 2009 with representative of the Member States to gain their views on fats, carbohydrates, fibres and water as well as Food-Based Dietary Guidelines. The EFSA searched for comments through this Open Consultation to validate its assumptions following intake requirements

- carbohydrates comprising 45%–60% of the overall daily caloric intake
- fats being comprised among 20%–35% of the overall caloric intake
- fibre needs: complying with 25 grams/day

EFSA considers that there are not sufficient data to set DRVs for sugars, and no systematic scientific substantiation linking diseases such as stroke or diabetes (DMT1 or DMT2) to an increased intake of sugars (glycemic load/glycemic index). In any case, there is much literature referring to this link, on journals with very high impact factor and statistically robust design and results.

Many problems seem nowadays to derive from having integrated EU level DRV:

- the presence of a previous EFSA opinion on Food Based Dietary Guidelines, aimed at stressing the need of having only country-based guidelines, against the WHO hypothesis. This is due to very different food patterns, for EFSA, inside Europe.
- the presence of private scheme such as GDA (Guidelines on Daily Amounts), referring on the same subject (calories from nutrient groups) but casting shadow on the effectiveness of DRVs as public authorities' scheme.

== Recommendations ==
General advice is given for healthy people using the table. The British government recommended that healthy people should eat a diet which contains plenty of starch (rice, bread, pasta and potatoes). It also recommends that a person should eat at least 5 fruit or vegetable portions each day. Meat, fish, eggs and other protein-rich foods should be eaten in moderation. Dairy products should also be moderately consumed. Finally, salt, saturated fat and sugar should be eaten least of all.

Exceptions to these rules include pregnant women and young children. Additionally, those who have little exposure to sunlight may need to take vitamin D supplementation.

=== Sources of energy ===
The Dietary Reference Values below are specified mainly for adults. They define the proportion of a person's total energy intake which should come from different components of food. These include fat and fatty acids, fibre, starch and sugars. These values do not apply to children, and children younger than five with small appetites should not have such restrictions imposed.

Nutrient	Population average % of food energy
Saturated fatty acids	Not more than 11%
Polyunsaturated fatty acids	6.5%
Monounsaturated fatty acids	13%
Trans fats	Not more than 2%
Total fat	Not more than 35%
Non-milk extrinsic sugars	Not more than 11%
Intrinsic milk sugars and starch	39%
Total carbohydrates	50%
Fibre as non-starch polysaccharide	18% [not applicable to children under 5]

=== Salt ===
The guideline salt intake for adults is about 6 grams of salt (approximately one teaspoon). The Food Standards Agency estimate the average salt intake is about 8.6 grams/day (2008). A high salt diet is likely to increase the risk of high blood pressure, which is associated with an increased risk of heart attack and stroke.

Age	Target salt intake (grams per day)
0–6 months	Less than 1g
7–12 months	1g
1–3 years	2g
4–6 years	3g
7–10 years	5g
11 years+	6g

=== Protein, vitamins and minerals ===
Recommendations for protein, vitamins and minerals vary by age. Where different intakes for males and females are recommended, the higher value is identified in the table below to ensure that the greatest daily needs of the group is met:

Nutrient	1-3yrs	4-6yrs	7-10yrs	11-14yrs	15-18yrs	Adults 19-50 yrs	Adults 50+
Protein	15g	20g	28g	42g	55g	55g	53g
Iron	7 mg	6 mg	9 mg	14.8 mg	14.8 mg	14.8 mg	9 mg
Zinc	5 mg	6.5 mg	7 mg	9 mg	9.5 mg	9.5 mg	9.5 mg
Vitamin A (retinol equivalents)	400mcg	400mcg	500mcg	600mcg	700mcg	700mcg	700mcg
Folate	70mcg	100mcg	150mcg	200mcg	200mcg	200mcg	200mcg
Vitamin C	30 mg	30 mg	30 mg	35 mg	40 mg	40 mg	40 mg

=== Water ===
In 2009, the European Food Safety Authority included water as a macronutrient in its dietary reference values for the first time:

Demographic group	Adequate Intake (daily)
Age 0-6 months	100–190 mL/kg of body weight
Age 6–12 months	800–1000 mL
Age 1-2 years	1100–1200 mL (interpolated)
Age 2-3 years	1300 mL (estimated)
Age 4–8 years	1600 mL (estimated)
Boys age 9–13 years	2100 mL (estimated)
Girls age 9–13 years	1900 mL (estimated)
Adults males (age 14+, including elderly)	2.5 L
Adults females (age 14+, including elderly)	2.0 L
Pregnant women	Additional 300 mL above age-based Adequate Intake
Lactating women	Additional 700 mL above age-based Adequate Intake

These Adequate Intake (AI) values include water from all dietary sources, including all beverages and as moisture in food. These AI values only apply assuming "moderate environmental temperature" and a physical activity level of 1.6 (sedentary/moderate).

The EFSA panel also stated that "No maximum daily amount of water that can be tolerated by a population group can be defined, without taking into account individual and environmental factors."

== See also ==
- Dietary Reference Intake – US system of nutrition recommendations
- Guideline Daily Amount – Former UK and EU food labelling system
- Reference Daily Intake – US/Canada food nutrient labelling system
- Reference Intake – EU/UK food nutrient labelling system
- Traffic light label
