= British food information regulations =

Food labelling laws in the UK

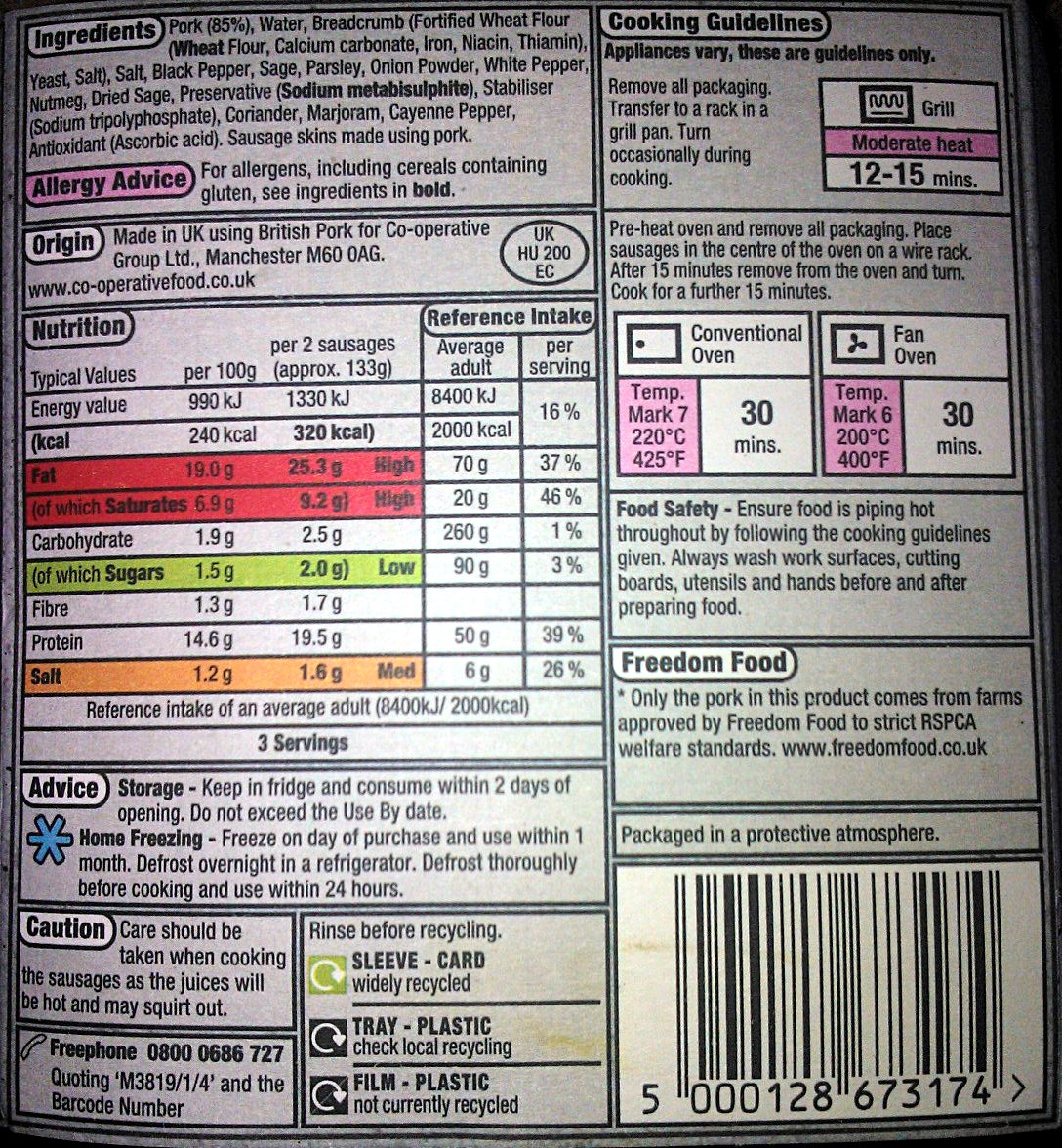
Nutritional label from a pack of sausages

The law in the United Kingdom on food information and labelling is multifaceted and is spread over many reforms and acts of Parliament. UK law is based on the relevant European Union rules, chiefly Regulation (EU) 1169/2011, which is implemented in the UK in the Food Information Regulations 2014 (SI 2014/1855), the Food Information (Wales) Regulations 2014, the Food Information (Scotland) Regulations 2014 and the Food Information Regulations (Northern Ireland) 2014. Regulations apply to the labelling of goods pre-packaged for sale and to the provision of information regarding non-prepacked (loose) foods.

== General rules ==
There are general rules applying to any food product:

- Name – It must inform the customer the nature of the product. It may also be necessary to attach a description to the product name. However, there are certain generic names which must be only used for their conventional uses. Muesli, coffee, and prawns are among those exceptions.
- Ingredients – All ingredients of the food must be stated under the heading "Ingredients" and must be stated in descending order of weight when present at more than 2% in the product. Ingredients making up less than 2% may be declared in any order at the end of the declaration. Moreover, certain ingredients, such as preservatives, must be identified as such by the label "Preservatives", a specific name, e.g. "sodium nitrite", and the corresponding European registration number colloquially known as an "E number", e.g. "E250". When ingredients are themselves made of a number of sub-ingredients (e.g., mayonnaise), these must be declared as well in the ingredient declaration. If ingredients or additives contain one of the listed 14 EU allergens, these must be explicitly named in the list. For example: "Preservative: E220 (Sulphites)".
- Nutritional information– The display of nutritional information is mandatory on most pre-packaged goods in Northern Ireland as result of the Northern Ireland Protocol. In the rest of the UK, displaying nutritional information is only mandatory if the manufacturer makes a "nutritional claim" such as "Low Sugar" or if vitamins and minerals have been added to the food.
- Medicinal or nutritional claims – Medicinal and nutritional claims are tightly regulated. Some are only allowed under certain conditions, while others are not authorized at all. For example, presenting claims the food product can treat, prevent, cure diseases or other "adverse conditions" are prohibited. While claiming the food is reduced in fat or rich in vitamins require the food to meet compulsory standards and grades. In addition, the terms must be used in a form specified in regulations.
- Date labelling
  Until 1980 there was no legal requirement for food to be labelled with date information, although some retailers had long been using dates, often in coded form not intelligible to purchasers, to help with stock control.
  Great Britain first introduced legislation in 1980 when the Food Labelling Regulations harmonized UK law with the 1979 EC Labelling Directive (79/112/EC), which required a "date of minimum durability" – the "best-before" date – but allowed member states to use their own terms, thus allowing the UK to use the sell-by date. When introduced, food could be sold after this date; it was information to help consumers, not a requirement. It later became illegal to sell food past its "use-by" date.
  There are two types of date tagging:
  - Use-by date – "Use by date" must be followed by a day and/or month which the product must be consumed by. This is to be applied on perishable foods that usually would be kept cold: fish, meat, dairy products, and "ready to eat" salads.
  - Best-before date – "Best before date" is used as an indicator of when the product will begin to degrade from optimal quality; this includes when the food becomes stale, begins to taste "off" or decays, rots, or goes mouldy. There are also regulations on which type of best before date must be applied:
    - Best before + day for foods with a shelf life of up to 3 months.
    - Best before end (BBE) + month for foods with a more-than 3-month shelf life.
    - Best before end (BBE) + year for food with a more-than 18-month shelf life.
- Storage conditions – If there are any particular storage conditions for the product to maintain its shelf life, these must be pointed out. However, as a rule, it is recommended to always describe the necessary storage conditions for a food product.
- Business name and address – In addition to the business name and address, it is necessary to indicate the manufacturer or packager if independent to the main business and the seller is established within the European Union.
- Place of origin – The food is required to specify its place of origin, especially if the name or trademark is misleading. An example of this is if the product is called "English Brie Cheese" when it is produced in France.
- Instruction for use – This is only necessary if it is not obvious how to use or prepare the product, in which case the consumer's own initiative must be used.
- Presentation – The label must be legible and easy to read. Also, it must be written in English but, the manufacturer may also include other languages.
- Batch identifier, such as lot mark or batch code – It must be possible to identify individual batches with a lot mark or batch code. The code must be prefixed with the letter "L" if it can not be distinguished from other codes; however, the date mark can be used as a lot mark. Manufacturers must bear in mind that the smaller the size of a batch, the smaller financial consequences in the case of a product recall.
- Sectioning – All of the following must be in the same field of vision:
  - Product name
  - Date mark
  - Estimated net weight or quantity
  - Alcohol strength (if applicable).
- Standard specification – Indicate the level of the standard compliances which the product are manufactured and packaging are completed against and the specification limits if the standard is not publicly available, especially for those of:
  - Microbial limits
  - Heavy metal limits
  - The limits of pesticide residuals
  - The limits of preservatives, artificial flavouring and colouring, etc.
  - Including the "not for EU" labelling on certain meat and dairy products to show that it may be sold in Northern Ireland, but not the EU under the Windsor Framework
- Food additives – The items should be presented by their approved names (i.e. domestically), functional classes, and numbers of International Numbering System (INS) or equivalent.
- Allergens – Certain common allergens must be declared explicitly in the ingredient declaration and a summary list of allergens may be added nearby for added clarity for the consumer. These include allergens present in the actual recipe's ingredients, but also those from additives and processing aids when residues may be present in the product. There are 14 sources of allergens that need to be mentioned when they or their derivatives are present in a product:
  - Celery
  - Cereals containing gluten
  - Crustaceans
  - Eggs
  - Fish
  - Lupin
  - Milk (including lactose)
  - Molluscs
  - Mustard
  - Nuts (specifically: almonds, Brazil nuts, cashews, hazelnuts, macadamias, pecans, pistachios and walnuts)
  - Peanuts
  - Sesame seeds
  - Soybeans
  - Sulphur dioxide and sulphites

== See also ==
- Acceptable daily intake
- Animal welfare
- Genetically modified food controversies
- Fair Packaging and Labeling Act (US)
- Federal Food, Drug, and Cosmetic Act
- Feed additive
- Food additives
- Food allergy
- Food irradiation
- Food safety
- Guideline Daily Amount
- Health claims on food labels
- Identifier
- List of food labeling regulations
- Mandatory country-of-origin labeling of food sold in the United States
- The Non-GMO Project
- Nutrition facts label
- Olericulture
- Packaging and labeling
- Pomology
- Produce
- Reference Intake
- Regulation of the release of genetic modified organisms
- Serial number
- Track and trace
- Viticulture
