= Food Standards Agency =

UK Government non-ministerial department

Food Standards Agency Welsh: Asiantaeth Safonau Bwyd

Non-ministerial government department overview
- Formed: 3 April 2000
- Jurisdiction: England, Wales and Northern Ireland
- Headquarters: Petty France, London, SW1
- Employees: 1,223 (2021/22)
- Annual budget: £159.7 million (2009–2010)
- Non-ministerial government department executives: Susan Jebb, chair; Katie Pettifer, CEO
- Website: www.gov.uk/government/organisations/food-standards-agency
Other UK counterparts
- Scotland: Food Standards Scotland

The Food Standards Agency is a non-ministerial government department of the Government of the United Kingdom. It is responsible for protecting public health in relation to food in England, Wales and Northern Ireland. It is led by a board appointed to act in the public interest. Its headquarters are in London, with offices in Birmingham, York, Cardiff and Belfast. Its counterpart in Scotland is Food Standards Scotland.

== History ==
The Agency was created based on a report by Professor Philip James, issued after several high-profile outbreaks and deaths from foodborne illness. It was felt that it was inappropriate to have one government department, the Ministry of Agriculture, Fisheries and Food, responsible for both the health of the farming and food processing industries and for food safety. The creation of the Agency was a manifesto commitment of the Labour Party during its 1997 general election campaign; with the party going on to win the election and form a new government, the Agency was then planned to be established by the end of 1999 but ultimately came into being in April 2000.

In 2006, the Wine Standards Board merged with the FSA, bringing with it responsibility for enforcing the EU wine regime in the UK.

Formerly an executive agency of the FSA, the Meat Hygiene Service merged with the FSA in April 2010 to form a new operations group with responsibility for the delivery of official controls.

Certain aspects of food labelling regulations in England were transferred from the Food Standards Agency to the Department for Environment, Food and Rural Affairs (Defra) on 1 September 2010. In England, the Agency retains responsibility for food safety-related labelling issues, whereas the devolved Food Standards Agency offices in Wales and Northern Ireland are still responsible for all labelling and standards policy.

Nutrition policy, including nutrition labelling, in England and Wales was transferred from the Food Standards Agency to the Department of Health and Social Care in England and to the Welsh Government's Department of Health and Social Services on 1 October 2010. On the establishment of Public Health England in 2013, the nutrition policy team – led by Alison Tedstone – transferred there.

The Food Standards Agency offices in Scotland and Northern Ireland retained their responsibilities for nutrition policy. Plans to create a new food standards body in Scotland were announced by Ministers in June 2012, and in January 2015, this body was established through primary legislation. Food Standards Scotland took over from the FSA on 1 April 2015 as the public body responsible for food safety, food standards, nutrition, food labelling and meat inspection in Scotland.

== Events ==
=== Recalls and contamination ===
In February 2005, the agency announced the discovery of the dye Sudan I in Worcester sauce, prompting a mass product recall of over 400 products that used the sauce as a flavouring.

On 31 March 2006, it published its "Survey of benzene levels in soft drinks", which tested 150 products and found that four contained benzene levels above the World Health Organization (WHO) guidelines for drinking water. The Agency asked for these to be removed from sale.

The Food Standards Agency also imposed restrictions on the sheep trade because of the consequences of the 1986 Chernobyl catastrophe, which were repealed in March 2012.

=== Children's advertising ===
The FSA pushed for stricter rules on TV advertising to children of foods high in salt, sugar and fat and devised a nutritional profiling system to measure the balance of benefit and detriment in individual food products. In 2007, the UK TV regulator Ofcom introduced restrictions on advertising of products that scored poorly under the scheme.

=== Food poisoning ===
The FSA first established targets for reducing food poisoning in July 2000. In June 2002, and re-released in June 2006, the FSA conducted an advertising campaign on British television, highlighting the danger of food poisoning caused by barbecues. The advert, intended to shock viewers, showed sausages sizzling on a barbecue, looking to the viewer as if they are cooked. However, when a pair of tongs pick up one of these sausages, it falls apart, and reveals pink, uncooked meat in the middle. To emphasise the risk of diarrhoea and vomiting caused by food poisoning, the song "When Will I See You Again" by The Three Degrees is played in the background.

=== Dean Review ===
In 2005, Brenda Dean carried out an independent review of the Food Standards Agency. The report made 22 recommendations, all of which were accepted by the Food Standards Agency board.

Dean concluded:

My overwhelming impression, having undertaken this Review, is of an organisation that has been extremely conscious of the importance of fulfilling the very serious responsibilities of changing both the perception and the reality of food safety in the UK.

It has done well in taking forward the experiences, good and bad, of the previous regime, to begin building its own reputation.

Most stakeholders agreed that the Agency has made significant progress towards improving food safety, gaining public confidence in food safety, and creating a modern culture in which it is the norm for procedures, information, consultation and decision-making to be in the public domain and to involve external stakeholders.

There was overwhelming support for the Agency's policy of basing decisions on scientific evidence, and for this policy to be maintained and developed further. The vast majority of stakeholders believe the Agency to be independent and to act independently, with general recognition that decisions are based on scientific evidence.

There was general support for the Agency amongst all stakeholder groups, both in terms of the objectives of the Agency, and the way in which the Agency has approached and undertaken its responsibilities.

One principal criticism, identified in the report, was (Recommendation 20):

It is clear that many stakeholders believe the Agency has already made policy decisions on GM foods and organic foods and is not open to further debate. The Agency must address the perceptions of these stakeholders who have now formed views of the Agency founded on their belief that the basis upon which the Agency's policy decisions were made was flawed.

=== Food Hygiene Rating Scheme (FHRS) ===
A food hygiene rating scheme has been deployed by the Food Standards Agency for all food businesses. Ratings are available at the business premises and online. Following a meeting in Cardiff, the FSA plans to make audit reports as widely available as possible for the public, following the example of Norwich City Council. According to Terence Collins, FSA's Director of communication, the reason behind this decision is to make ratings simple and easily understood for every single business.

Apart from Scotland which is under a different Food Hygiene Information Scheme, the FSA's Food Hygiene Rating Scheme will be tested throughout United Kingdom. As a result, ratings range from 0 (improvement urgently needed) to 5 (very good), and may be displayed on a certificate. This information is also available online. As of 2012, rating primary meat processing plants was the next step forward for the FSA, as meat audit are currently only available through Freedom of Information requests. As of 2015, the local authority in Rutland is the only one which has not accepted the scheme.

== Chairperson and advisory committees ==
Sir John Krebs was the first chair of the Food Standards Agency, until 2005. Dame Deirdre Hutton was chair between 2005 and July 2009, followed by Jeff Rooker until July 2013. Tim Bennett, the former deputy chair, was appointed as interim chair whilst a permanent appointment was made. Heather Hancock was appointed the new chair on 1 April 2016, for a three-year term, and reappointed for a further three year term from 1 April 2019.

The Agency is advised by a number of independent expert committees, including the following:

- Advisory Committee on Animal Feedingstuffs
- Advisory Committee on the Microbiological Safety of Food
- Advisory Committee on Novel Foods and Processes
- Advisory Committee on Social Sciences
- Committee on Toxicity
- Science Council

== See also ==
- Dietary Reference Values
- Guideline Daily Amount
- List of food labeling regulations
- Novel food
- Reference Intake
- United Kingdom food information regulations
- Food Standards Scotland
