= Nutrition facts label =

Table of nutrition facts on food labels

A sample nutrition facts label, with instructions from the U.S. Food and Drug Administration

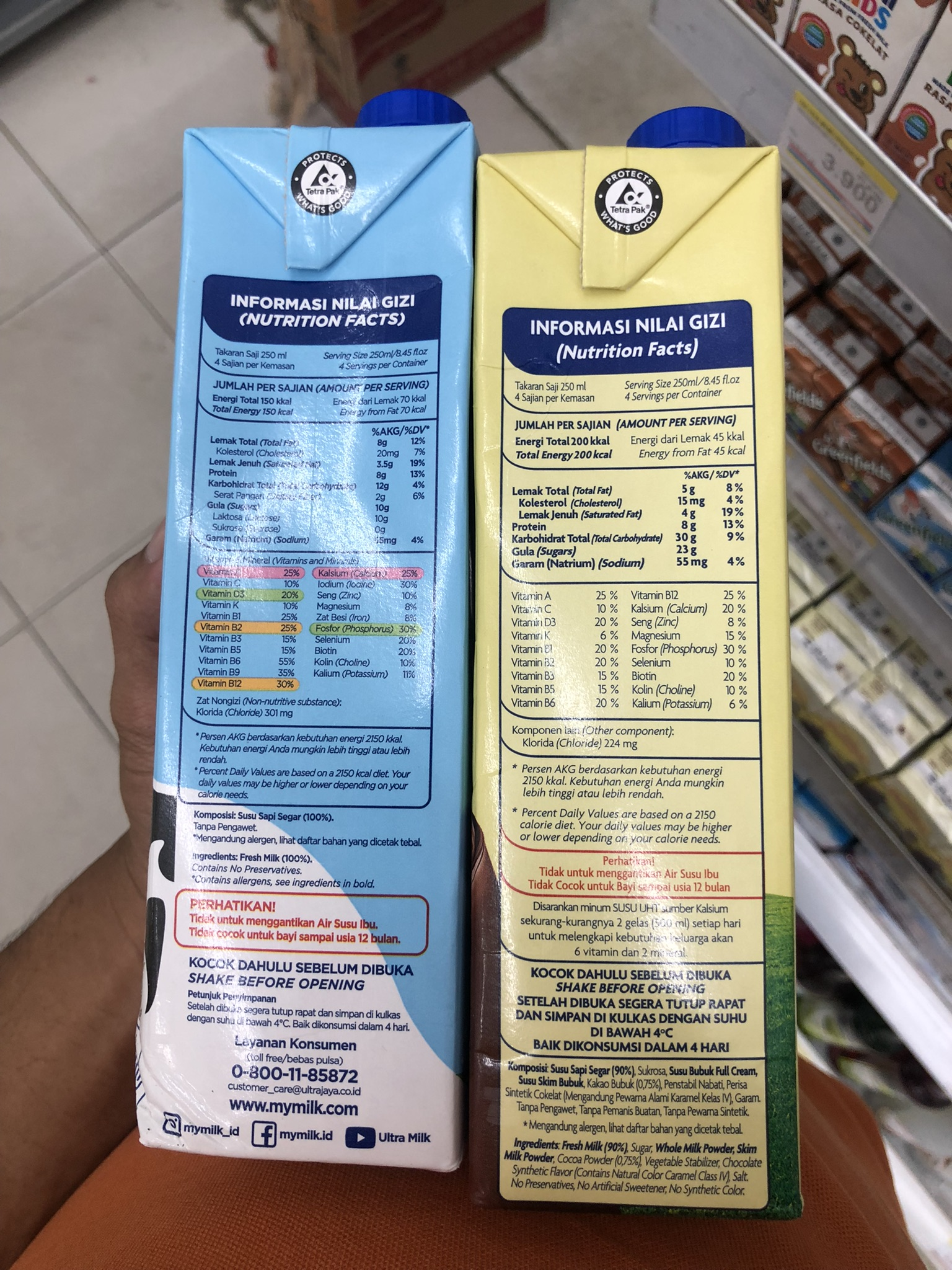
Nutrition facts placement for two Indonesian cartons of milk

The nutrition facts label (also known as the nutrition information panel, and other slight variations) is a label required on most packaged food in many countries, showing what nutrients and other ingredients (to limit and get enough of) are in the food. Labels are usually based on official nutritional rating systems. Most countries also release overall nutrition guides for general educational purposes. In some cases, the guides are based on different dietary targets for various nutrients than the labels on specific foods.

Nutrition facts labels are one of many types of food labels required by regulation or applied by manufacturers. They were first introduced in the U.S. in 1994, and in the U.K. in 1996.

== Australia and New Zealand ==
Australia and New Zealand use a nutritional information panel of the following format:

NUTRITION INFORMATION
Servings per package: x Serving size: y g
	Quantity per Serving	Quantity per 100 g
Energy	0	kJ (Cal)
Protein	0	g
Fat, total	0	g
saturated	0	g
Carbohydrate	g	g
sugars	g	g
Sodium	mg	mg

Other items are included as appropriate, and the units may be varied as appropriate (e.g. substituting ml for g, or mmol for mg in the 'Sodium' row). In April 2013 the New Zealand government introduced rules around common claims made on food packaging, such as 'low in fat'. In June 2019, the Food Regulation Standing Committee (FRSC) proposed pictorial approaches to convey the amount of sugars and/or added sugar in a serving of food. An experiment showed that sugar-teaspoon labelling reduced the intention to purchase sugar-sweetened beverages.

== Canada ==
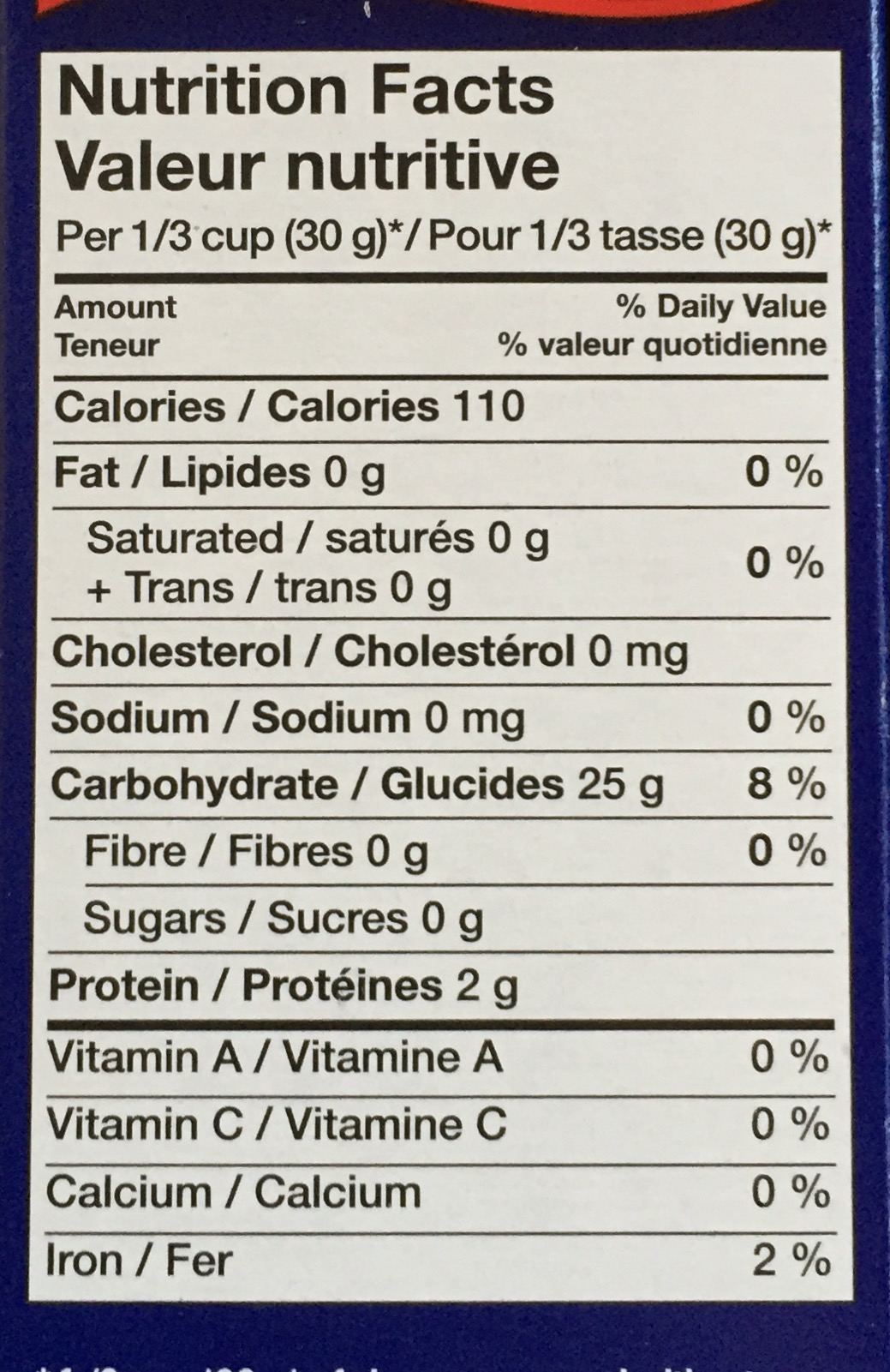
A Canadian Nutrition Label displaying information in both English and French

In Canada, a standardized "Nutrition Facts" label was introduced as part of regulations passed in 2003, and became mandatory for most prepackaged food products on December 12, 2005. (Smaller businesses were given until December 12, 2007, to make the information available.) In accordance with food packaging laws in the country, all information, including the nutrition label, must be written in both English and French, the country's two official languages. The province of Québec has specific requirements in regards to bilingual packaging, most notably being that the French language must be the prominent language on product labels.

Canadian regulation tightly controls the manner in which the nutrition fact table (NFT) data are laid out. There is a variety of possible formats for use on a given food package. A hierarchy is used to select among the formats (28 main formats, and 2–7 sub-formats for each). This results in standard (vertical) formats being considered for use before horizontal and linear formats. The selection hierarchy also allows the NFT to occupy no more than 15% of the physical package's available display area (ADS), but never to be smaller than a format that would be less than 15% of ADS. In practice, determining the ADS of a package, and selecting the appropriate NFT format, can be a detailed calculation.

Beginning January 2026, prepackaged foods must also display a front-of-package advisory label if they contain certain amounts of saturated fats, sodium, or sugars.

== China ==
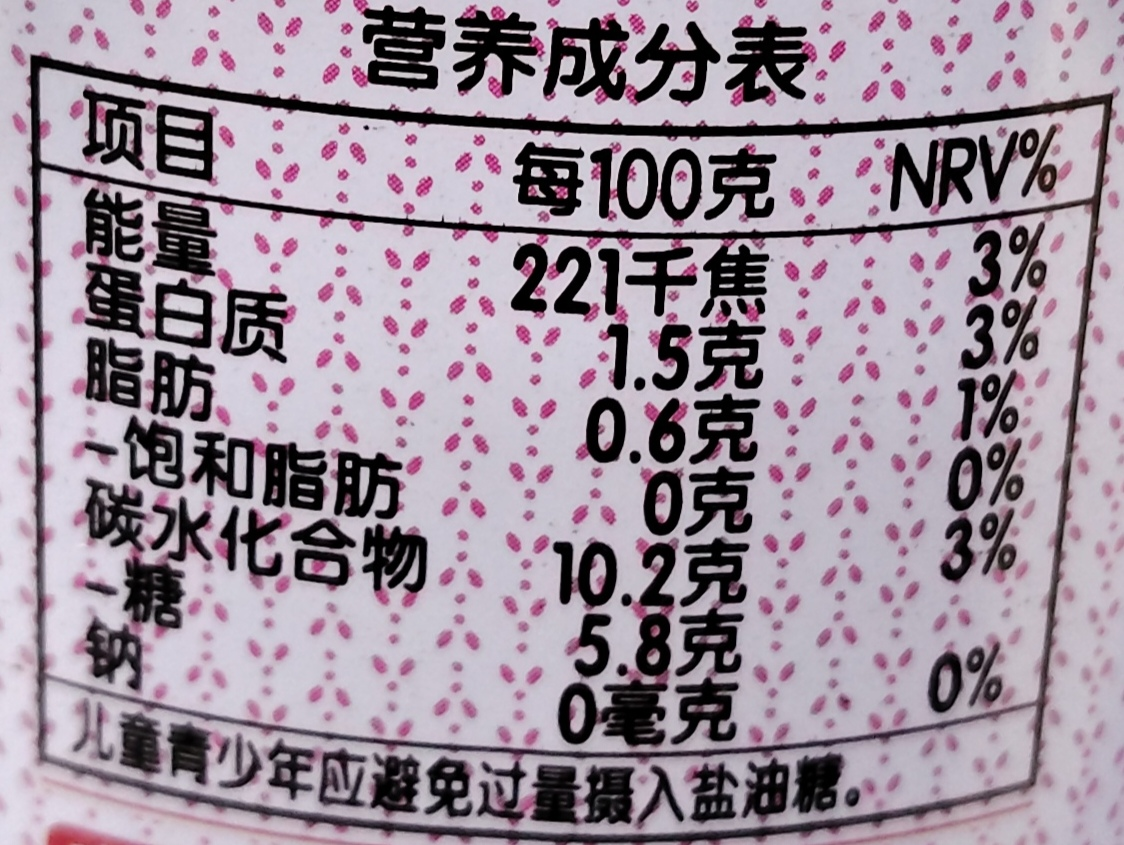
An example of a Chinese nutrition facts label under GB 28050-2025

In 2011 the Chinese Ministry of Health released the National Food Safety Standard for Nutrition Labeling of Prepackaged Foods (GB 28050-2011). The core nutrients that must be on a label are: protein, fat, carbohydrate and sodium. Energy is noted in kJ. And all values must be per 100g/100ml.

The following types of food are exempt from labeling:

- Fresh food, such as prepackaged raw meat/fish/egg/vegetables and eggs
- Alcoholic drinks, specifically those with more than 0.5% ABV
- Food with small packages, defined as total package surface area ≤ 100 cm^{2}, or largest-surface area ≤ 20 cm^{2}
- Freshly made and sold food
- Packaged drinking water
- Prepackaged food with daily consumption ≤ 10 g or ≤ 10 mL
- Types of food exempt from labeling by other laws and regulations
  - For example, GB7718-2011 section 4.2 exempts non-consumer-oriented food products from labeling.

The standard is revised in March 2025, and start to effective since 16 March 2027. The core nutrients which newly added on a label are trans fat and sugar, and indicating that "Children and adolescents should avoid consuming excessive amounts of salt, oil, and sugar" (Chinese: 儿童青少年应避免摄入过量盐油糖).

== European Union and United Kingdom ==
A UK nutrition information label, for low-fat yoghurt. A key difference from US labelling is that it always gives values for a set quantity (100 ml or - like here - 100 g), allowing easy comparison between products. Also, fibre is not considered a type of carbohydrate.

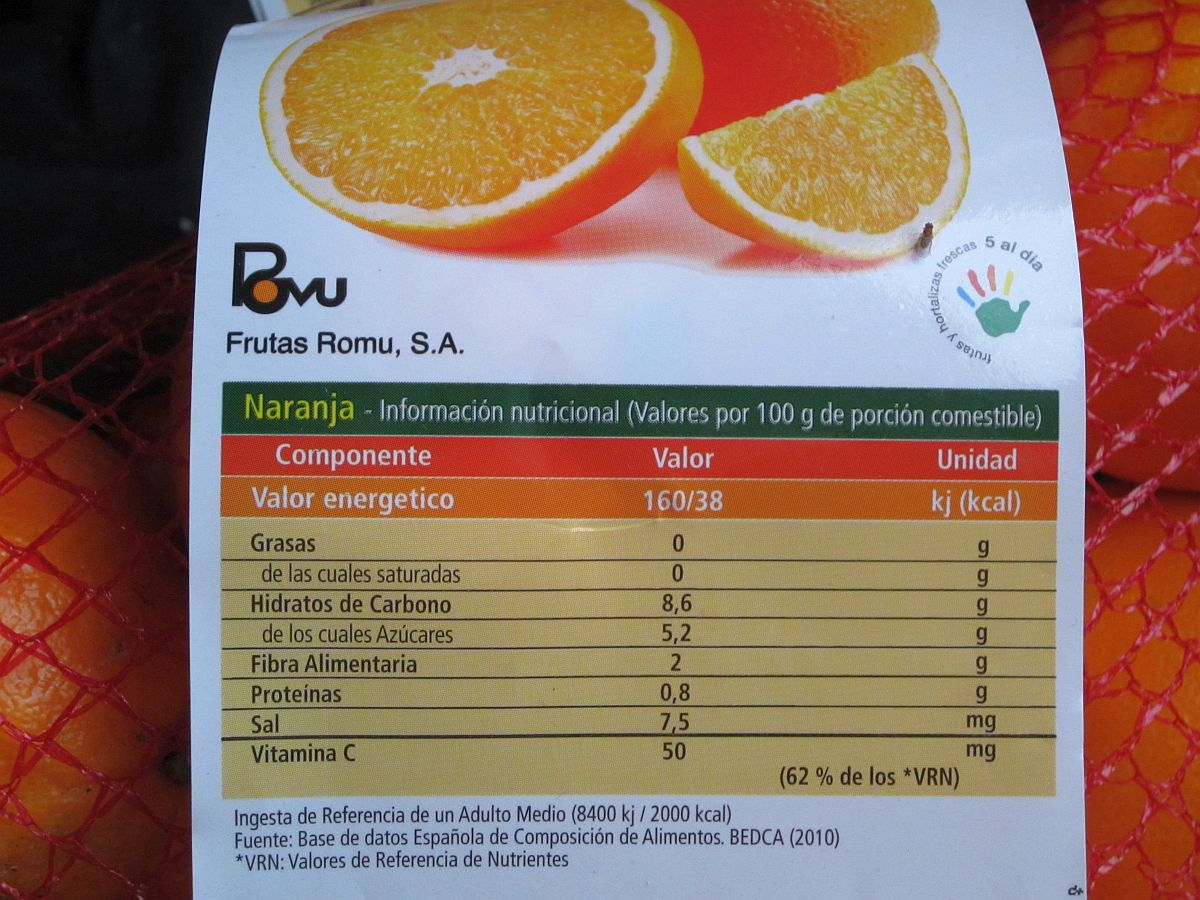
A rare example of optional nutrition facts on a label for oranges (in the EU not mandatory for unprocessed fruits)

The United Kingdom introduced Guideline Daily Amounts in 1996. This system was adopted in the European Union and replicated other countries.

It was regulated by the Commission Directive 2008/100/EC of 28 October 2008 amending Council Directive 90/496/EEC on nutrition labelling for foodstuffs as regards recommended daily allowances and definitions. A new regulation is now in force (Regulation 1169/2011). Nutritional labelling becomes mandatory for most pre-packaged foods as from December 2016.

In the European Union, along the "old" rules (Directive 90/496, amended), the information (usually in panel format) is most often labelled "Nutrition Information" (or equivalent in other EU languages). An example is shown on the right. The panel is optional, but if provided, the prescribed content and format must be followed. It will always give values for a set quantity—100 g (3.5 oz) or 100 ml (3.5 imp fl oz; 3.4 US fl oz) of the product—and often also for a defined "serving", as an option. First will come the energy values, in both kilocalories and kilojoules.

Then will come a breakdown of constituent elements: usually most or all of protein, carbohydrate, starch, sugar, fat, fibre and sodium. The "fat" figure is likely to be further broken down into saturated and unsaturated fat, while the "carbohydrate" figure is likely to give a subtotal for sugars. With the "new" rules, the mandatory information is: energy, fat, saturates, carbohydrates, sugars, protein and salt, in that particular order, with options to extend this list to: mono-unsaturates, polyunsaturates, polyols, starch, fibre, and vitamins and minerals.

With regards to health claims and nutrition (composition) claims, these are harmonised in the EU through Regulation 1924/2006, amended. In November 2012, the European Commission published two new regulations: Regulation (EC) No. 1047/2012 and Regulation (EC) No. 1048/2012. Certain nutrition claim groups as of Regulation (EC) No 1924/2006 had to be changed. Moreover, the health claims associated to barley beta-gluten were amended (e.g. lowering blood cholesterol).

Within Regulation 1924, there are legal definitions of terms such as "low fat", "high fibre", "reduced calories".

All health claims have been harmonised in the European Union. They can be used if they have been approved by EFSA. The list of approved and rejected claims is available on a web site.

Provided the full nutrition information is shown on the packet, additional nutritional information and formats (e.g. a traffic light rating system) may be included and this falls outside the scope of Regulation.

The United Kingdom regulations are given in Schedules 6 and 7 of the Food Labelling Regulations 1996.

== Hong Kong ==
In Hong Kong nutrition facts labels are regulated by the subsidiary legislation Food and Drugs (Composition and Labelling) (Amendment: Requirements for Nutrition Labelling and Nutrition Claim) Regulation 2008.

== India ==
The Ministry of Health and Family Welfare had, on September 19, 2008, notified the Prevention of Food Adulteration (5th Amendment) Rules, 2008, mandating packaged food manufacturers to declare on their product labels nutritional information and a mark from the F.P.O or Agmark (Companies that are responsible for checking food products) to enable consumers to make informed choices while purchasing. Prior to this amendment, disclosure of nutritional information was largely voluntary though many large manufacturers tended to adopt the international practice.

== Mexico ==
Food products sold in Mexico use the NOM-051-SCFI-1994 "Información nutrimental" product labelling standard, very similar to "Nutrition Facts" in the US. The Official Mexican Standard, or NOM (Norma Oficial Mexicana), was developed by the Mexican Secretary of Commerce and Industrial Promotion (Secretaría de Comercio y Fomento Industrial), now a part of the Secretary of the Economy (SECOFI). It entered into effect on January 24, 1996, and defines "General specifications for labelling foods and pre-bottled non-alcoholic beverages."

== Singapore ==
In 1998, the voluntary Healthier Choice Symbol system was created by the national Health Promotion Board (HPB) to allow consumer make informed food choices while shopping for groceries. This system was extended to food operators in 2003, allowing them to display the symbol next to the dishes meeting its criteria on the menu. In 2020, HPB, along with its parent ministry, Ministry of Health, introduced a new compulsory grading system, Nutri-Grade for pre-packaged drinks, supplanting the Healthier Choice Symbol to combat obesity. Nutri-Grade system is based on the sugar and saturated fat content in beverages, and has four grading levels. This was enforced in December 2022, and would be rolled out to freshly prepared beverages by end of 2023.

== United States ==
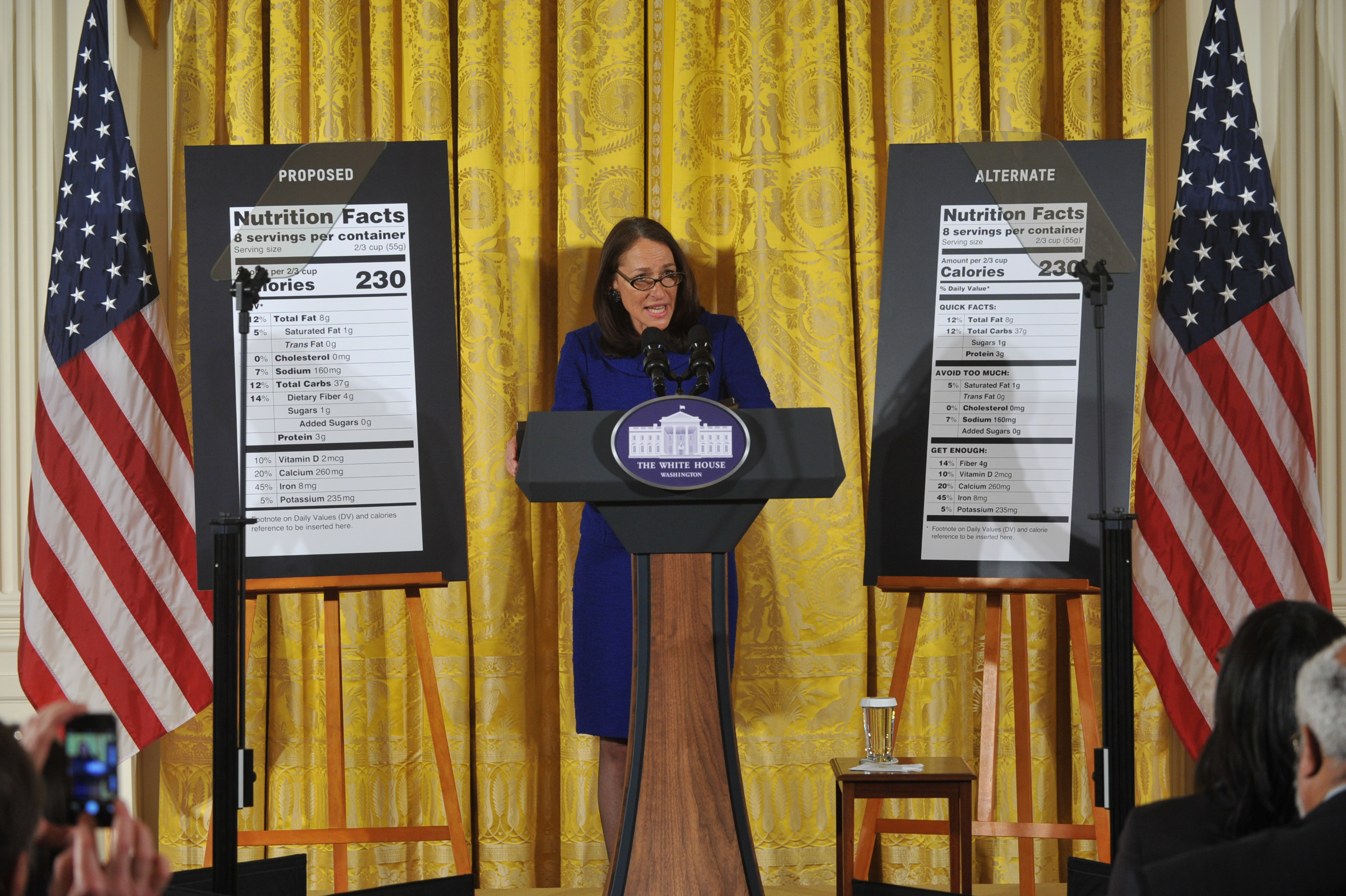
FDA Commissioner Margret Hamburg speaks at a White House event regarding proposed updates to the FDA's Nutrition Facts labels for food packaging. Feb. 27, 2014

In the United States, the Nutritional Facts label lists the Daily Value (%DV) or the percentage supplied in a serving (portion) or an entire package that is recommended to be met or not exceeded in the daily American diet. A footnote on the label states that the % Daily Value (DV) refers to the percent each nutrient "contributes to a daily diet" and that "2,000 calories a day is used for general nutrition advice."

With certain exceptions, such as baby foods and infant formula, the following Daily Values are used. These are called Reference Daily Intake (RDI) values and were originally based on the highest 1968 Recommended Dietary Allowances (RDA) for each nutrient in order to assure that the needs of all age and sex combinations were met. These are older than the current RDA of the Dietary Reference Intake. For vitamin C, vitamin D, vitamin E, vitamin K, calcium, phosphorus, magnesium, and manganese, the current highest RDAs are up to 50% higher than the older Daily Values used in labeling, whereas for other nutrients the recommended needs have gone down. A side-by-side table of the old and new adult Daily Values is provided at Reference Daily Intake. As of October 2010, the only micronutrients that are required to be included on all labels are vitamin A, vitamin C, calcium, and iron. To determine the nutrient levels in the foods, companies may develop or use databases, and these may be submitted voluntarily to the U.S. Food and Drug Administration (FDA) for review.

Nutrient	Daily Value for label (before 2016 update)	highest RDA of DRI	unit
Vitamin A	5,000	3,000	IU
Vitamin C	60	90	mg
Thiamine (Vitamin B1)	1.5	1.2	mg
Riboflavin (Vitamin B2)	1.7	1.3	mg
Niacin (Vitamin B3)	20	16	mg
Pantothenic acid (Vitamin B5)	10	5	mg
Pyridoxine (Vitamin B6)	2	1.7	mg
Folate (Vitamin B9)	400	400	μg
Biotin (Vitamin B7)	300	30	μg
Cyanocobalamin (Vitamin B12)	6	2.4	μg
Vitamin D	400	600	IU
Vitamin E	12	15	mg
Vitamin K	80	120	μg
Calcium	1,000	1,300	mg
Iron	18	18	mg
Phosphorus	1,000	1,250	mg
Iodine	150	150	μg
Magnesium	400	420	mg
Zinc	15	11	mg
Selenium	70	55	μg
Copper	2	0.9	mg
Manganese	2	2.3	mg
Chromium	120	35	μg
Molybdenum	75	45	μg
Chloride	3,400	2,300	mg

Additionally, there is a requirement for ingredients to be listed in order from highest to lowest quantity, according to their weight. This requirement has some flexibility during the COVID-19 pandemic.

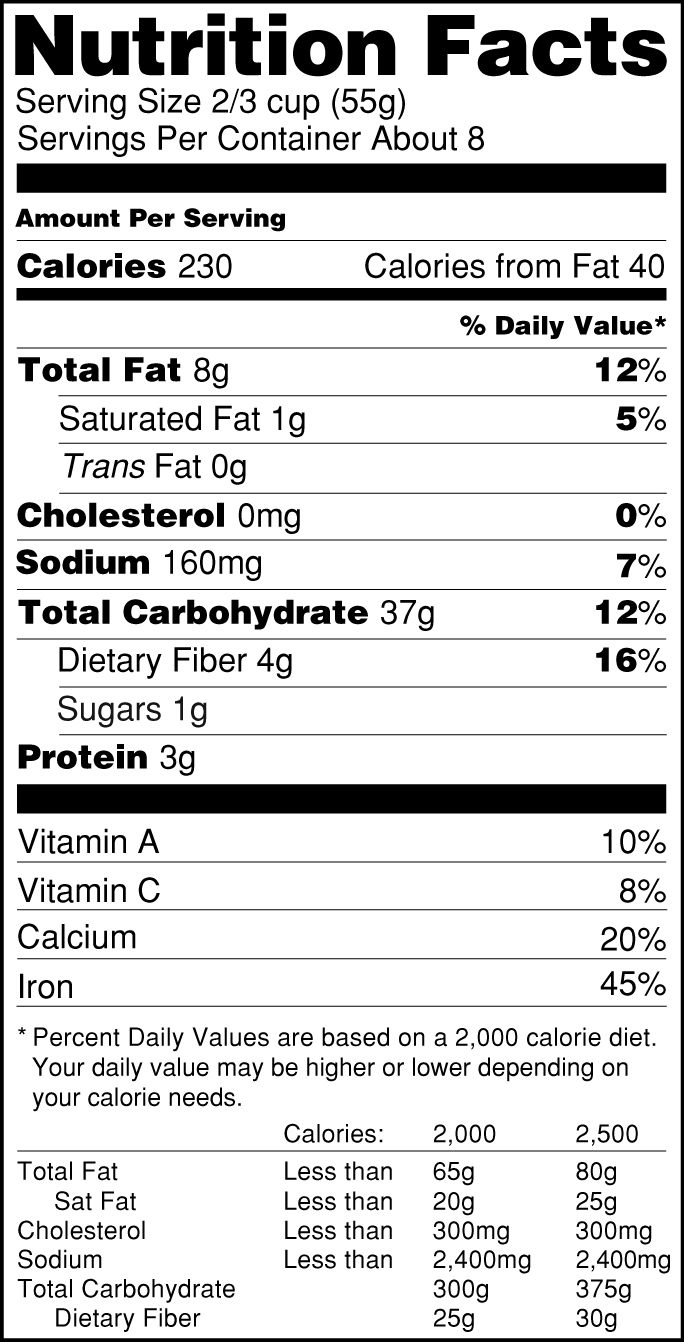
The original FDA Nutrition Facts label, as of 2006

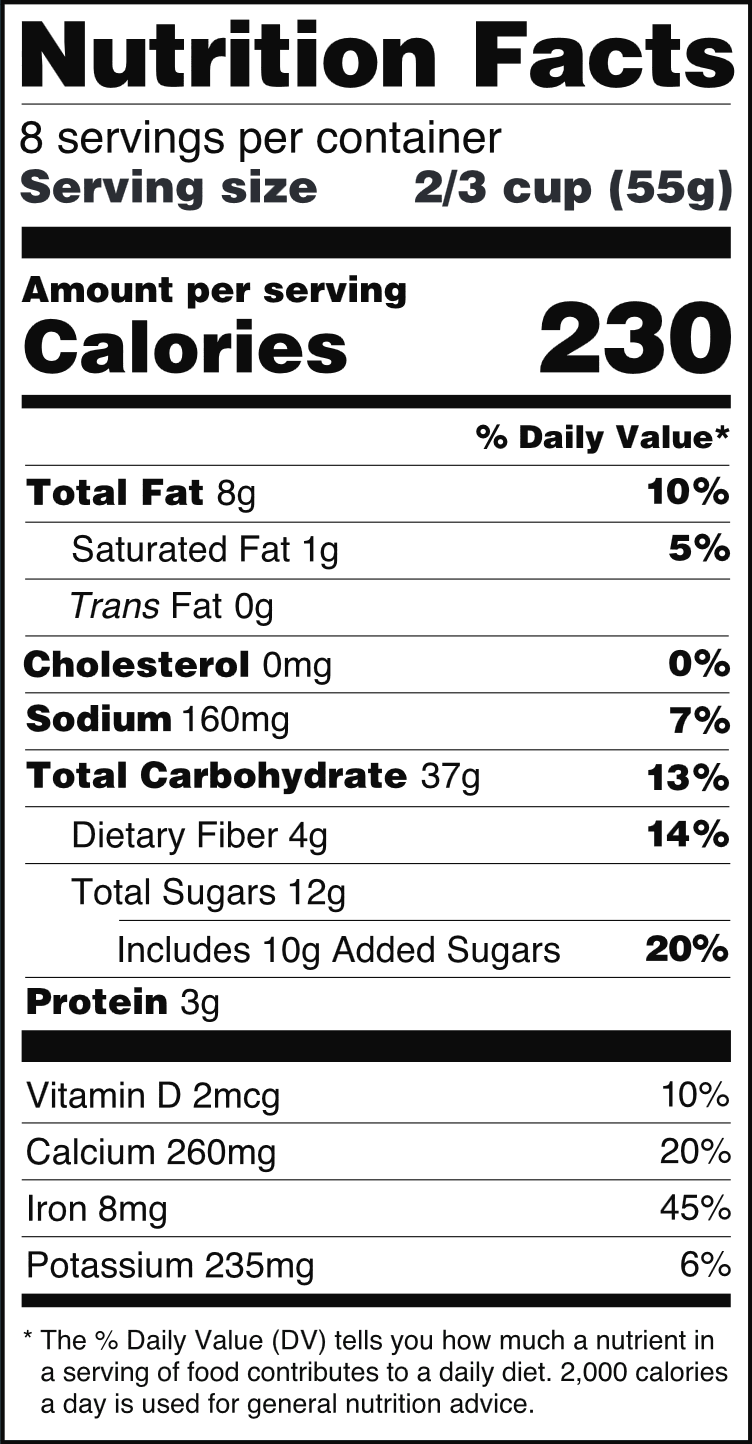
The new Nutrition Facts label, in use since 2016

The label was mandated for most food products under the provisions of the 1990 Nutrition Labeling and Education Act (NLEA), per the recommendations of the FDA. It was one of several controversial actions taken during the tenure of FDA Commissioner Dr. David Kessler. The law required food companies to begin using the new food label on packaged foods beginning May 8, 1994 (meat and poultry products were not covered by NLEA, though the U.S. Department of Agriculture proposed similar regulations for voluntary labeling of raw meat and poultry). Foods labeled before that day could use the old label. The old "voluntary" FDA nutrition label had been introduced in the 1970s, and was titled "Nutrition Information Per Serving" or simply, "Nutrition Information". The 1990s revised "Nutrition Facts" label would appear on all products in 1995.

The label begins with a standard serving measurement, calories are listed second, and then following is a breakdown of the constituent elements including % daily value (%DV). Always listed are total fat, sodium, carbohydrates and protein; the other nutrients usually shown may be suppressed, if they are zero. Usually all 15 nutrients are shown: calories, calories from fat, total fat, saturated fat, trans fat, cholesterol, sodium, carbohydrates, dietary fiber, sugars, protein, vitamin A, vitamin C, calcium, and iron.

Products containing less than 5 g of fat show amounts rounded to the nearest 0.5 g. Amounts less than 0.5 g are rounded to 0 g. For example, if a product contains 0.45 g of trans fat per serving, and the package contains 18 servings, the label would show 0 g of trans fat, even though the product actually contains a total of 8.1 g of trans fat.

In addition to the nutrition label, products may display certain nutrition information or health claims on packaging. These health claims are only allowed by the FDA for "eight diet and health relationships based on proven scientific evidence", including: calcium and osteoporosis, fiber-containing grain products, fruits and vegetables and cancer, fruits, vegetables, and grain products that contain fiber—particularly soluble fiber—and the risk of coronary heart disease, fat and cancer, saturated fat and cholesterol and coronary heart disease, sodium and hypertension, and folate and neural tube defects. The Institute of Medicine recommended these labels contain the most useful nutritional information for consumers: saturated fats, trans fats, sodium, calories, and serving size. In January 2011, food manufacturers and grocery stores announced plans to display some of this nutrition information on processed food.

The nutrition facts label currently appears on more than 6.5 billion food packages. President Bill Clinton issued the Presidential Award for Design Excellence for the nutrition facts label in 1997 to Burkey Belser and Jerold Mande. The nutrition facts label has been used as a design model for consumer transparency in the tech industry, including the Federal Communications Commission's "Broadband Facts" digital label introduced in March 2024.

The FDA does not require any specific typeface be used in the Nutrition Facts label, mandating only that the label "utilize a single easy-to-read type style", though its example label uses Helvetica. However, as regulated by the FDA and the USDA, it is mandatory for certain information listed in the label to be written in English, including: name of the product, net quantity, serving size and number of servings per package, nutrition facts, ingredient list, and name of manufacturer or distributor. The smallest lettering should be at least 1/16th of an inch tall (1.5875 millimeters), based on the height of a lowercase "o".

In January 2006, Trans fat was required to be listed under saturated fat. This was the first significant change to the Nutrition Facts panel since it was introduced in 1993.

=== 2016 revision ===
In 2014, the U.S. Food and Drug Administration proposed several simultaneous improvements to nutrition labeling for the first time in over 20 years. The proposed changes were based on trends of consumption of nutrients of public health importance. However, studies had shown that the majority of the U.S. population could not understand the information in the then current Nutrition Facts Label. Nutrition label numeracy is particularly low in older individuals, of black and Hispanic race/ethnicity, who are unemployed, born outside of the US, have lower English proficiency, lower education achievement, lower income, or live in the South.

Final changes included raising serving sizes to more accurately reflect how many servings the average individual is actually consuming, removing "calories from fat" and instead focusing on total calories and type of fats being consumed in a product, and listing extra sugar added to a product, as well as declaring the amount of vitamin D and potassium in a product and adjusting recommended Daily Value amounts. Some of these changes sparked a major debate between the food industry and public health agencies. The proposal to indicate sugar added during food production, in particular, was brought forward by the FDA as a measure to counter the increase in per capita sugar consumption in the US, which over the last decades exceeded the limits recommended by scientific institutions and governmental agencies. Major American food associations opposed the label change, indicating "lack of merit" and "no preponderance of evidence" to justify the inclusion of sugar added in the new label.

The rules for the new design were finalized on May 20, 2016. Manufacturers were initially given until July 26, 2018, to comply (or July 26, 2019, if they have less than $10 million in annual food sales); a rule change extended the compliance deadline to January 1, 2020 (or January 1, 2021, for smaller sellers). For food and dietary supplement labeling purposes, the amounts of vitamins and nutritionally essential minerals in a serving are expressed as a percent of Daily Value (%DV). Many of the definitions of 100% Daily Value were changed as part of the revision.

=== Alcohol ===
In the United States, alcoholic beverages are regulated by the Alcohol and Tobacco Tax and Trade Bureau (TTB). As of 2012, the TTB does not require alcoholic beverage packaging to have a nutrition facts label. Since at least 2003, consumer groups have lobbied the TTB to require labeling disclosing Nutrition Facts information. Some marketing terms, such as "light" and "table wine", must follow TTB guidelines. Packaging must disclose alcohol content in some circumstances.

Mandatory information on the label varies by type of beverage, and includes:

- Brand name
- Name and address of manufacturer (either bottling plant or main headquarters)
- Country of origin if imported (required by U.S. Customs and Border Protection regulations)
- Class, the definitions of which are regulated (e.g. beer, ale, lager, gin, vodka, rum, tequila, cordial, liqueurs)
- Health warning for beverages 0.5% or more alcohol by volume
- Net contents
  - For malt beverages, must be in United States customary units (e.g. pints or fluid ounces)
  - For distilled spirits, must be in metric units. Bottles must be 50 mL, 100 mL, 200 mL, 375 mL, 750 mL, 1 L, or 1.75 L. Bottles must be 50 mL, 100 mL, 200 mL, or 355 mL.
  - For wine, must be in metric units, and bottles must be 50 mL, 100 mL, 187 mL, 375 mL, 500 mL, 750 mL, 1 L, 1.5 L, 3 L, or a larger size with an even number of liters.
- Alcohol content (percent by volume):
  - For malt beverages, mandatory only if some alcohol is due to added flavors, or if required by state law
  - For distilled spirits, mandatory
  - For wine, optional
- Declaration of sulfites required for wine sold in interstate (not intrastate) commerce if 10 ppm or more of sulfur dioxide
- Optional but regulated terms:
  - For malt beverages: "draft", "light", "low-carbohydrate"
  - For wine: grape variety and appellation of origin, wine designation (e.g. "white", "red", "rose", "table"), viticultural area, "estate bottled", "vinted", vintage date
  - "Organic" (regulated by USDA)
  - Declarations for major allergens

=== Caffeine ===
Health researchers have called for the mandatory labeling of food products with added caffeine, which is a psychoactive nervous system stimulant. If over-consumed, caffeine can cause seizures, kidney problems, liver problems, heart arrhythmia, and death. The Coca-Cola Company and PepsiCo began labeling caffeine content in 2007.

== See also ==
- Diet (nutrition)
- Food energy
- List of food labeling regulations
- Table of food nutrients
- Nutrition scale
- Serving size
- Atwater system (for calculating available food energy)
- The Non-GMO Project
- Quack Miranda warning
