= Helen S. Mitchell =

American nutritionist

Helen Swift Mitchell
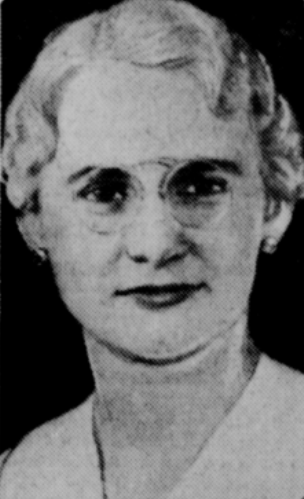
- Born: September 25, 1895; Bridgeport, Connecticut
- Died: December 12, 1984 (aged 89); Pleasant Hill, Tennessee
- Occupations: Biochemist, nutritionist

Helen Swift Mitchell (September 21, 1895 - December 12, 1984) was an American biochemist and nutritionist. She was the research director at the Battle Creek Sanitarium, and taught courses in nutrition at Battle Creek College and University of Massachusetts and later became an exchange professor at Hokkaido University in Japan. During World War II, she was part of government committees that did research on nutrition and was critical of fad diets that came about during that time. She did research on and published works about the dietary conditions of rats, and later co-authored the textbook Nutrition in Health and Disease.

== Early life and education ==
Helen Mitchell was born in Bridgeport, Connecticut to Walter L. and Minnie Mitchell (née Swift) in 1895.

Mitchell earned a Bachelor of Arts degree from Mount Holyoke College in 1917. She continued her education at Yale University, earning a PhD in 1921. She studied under Lafayette Mendel, who continued to correspond with her later in her career. Mendel was unique in the early 20th Century, as he taught and mentored female doctoral students, many of whom became leaders in their fields. Mitchell's thesis was on 'the choice of adequate and inadequate diets by rats and mice'.

== Career ==
In 1921 she became the research director at the Battle Creek Sanitarium and taught in John Harvey Kellogg's School of Dietetics. At Battle Creek College, Mitchell worked as a professor in nutrition and physiology from 1921 to 1935. During her time there, her research expertise was called upon by Wilfred Grenfell to conduct research on behalf of the Grenfell Mission in Newfoundland and Labrador. Along with Margery and Catherine Vaughn, they conducted a year-long survey in 1929 of gardens and livestock to determine nutritional problems that coastal fishing towns were having. She found that many families were lacking minerals and vitamins from their overall calorie count.

Mitchell was research professor of nutrition at the University of Massachusetts from 1935 to 1941. She later became the Head of the Department of Food and Nutrition and the Dean of the School of Home Economics (1947-1960).

=== War years ===
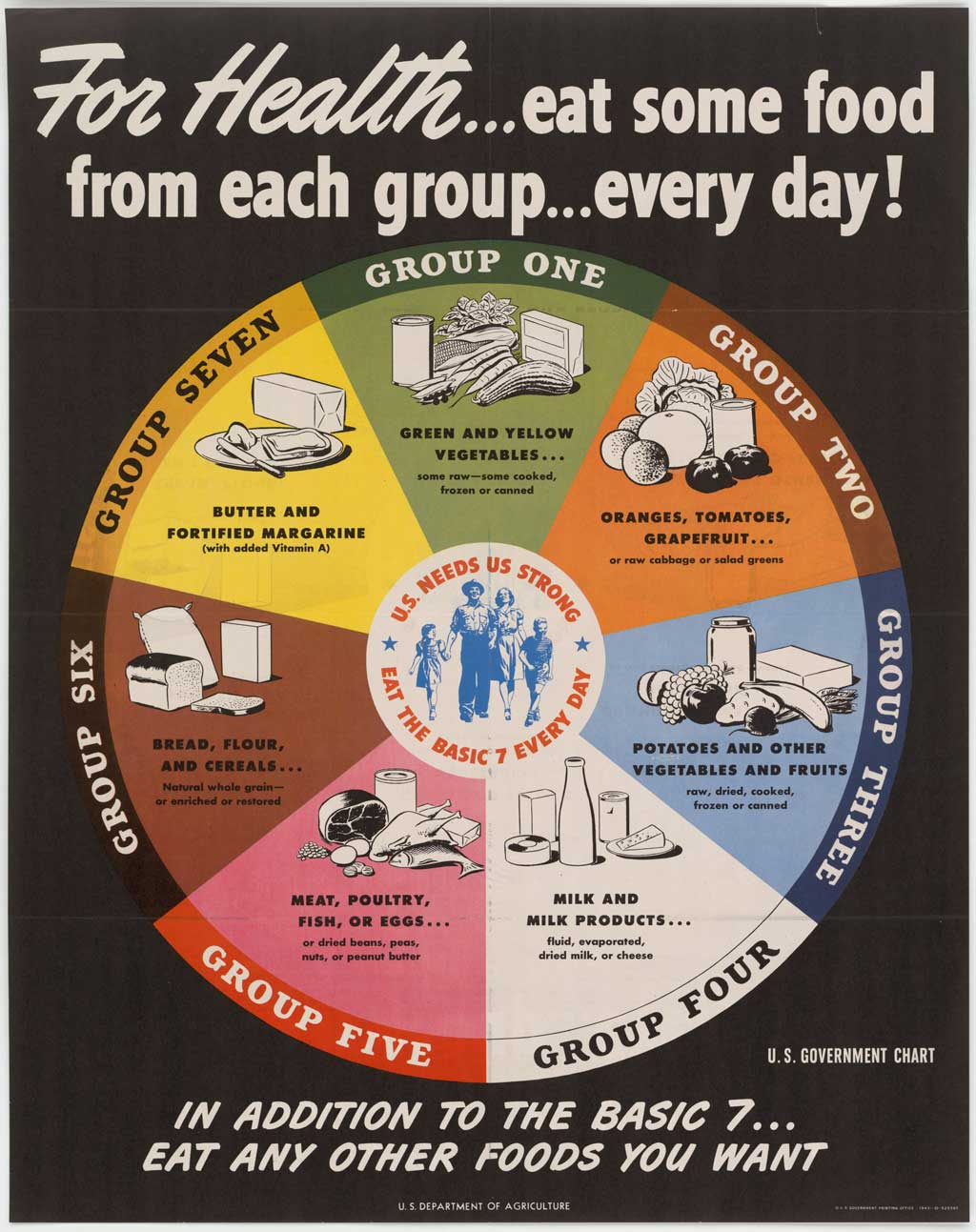
USDA Basic 7 Food Groups during War Time

In 1940, the National Research Council, wanting to predict nutritional needs for the military and civilians set up the Food and Nutrition Committee. Mitchell was a part of this committee from 1940 to 1945 and worked on figuring out the recommended daily or dietary allowance. She was one of three women, along with Lydia Roberts and Hazel Stiebeling, who overnight came up with a preliminary standard for wartime diets. During World War II, she was principal nutritionist for the Office of Defense, Health and Welfare Services (1941-1943) and chief nutritionist for the State Department Office of Foreign Relief and Rehabilitation (1943-1944).

Paul V. McNutt from the Federal Emergency Management Administration supervised Mitchell's duty of elevate nutrition throughout the U.S. by compiling state resources.

=== Japan ===
In 1960 she also worked as an exchange professor for Hokkaido University in Japan and conducted research on nutrition of Japanese orphanage children after World War II. Working with Setsuko Santo, they determined in their first survey in 1960 that the children's stature was well below that of the national Hokkaido average based on nutritional disadvantages like lacking protein and vitamin A. In 1965 another survey of these same orphanages was conducted and found that the children's stature had increased due to increased nutritional budget. However, they were still under the Hokkaido national average.

=== Fad diets ===
In the early 1900s, Harvey Kellogg, a mentor to Mitchell, was a well known faddist who believed in the vegetarian diet at the Battle Creek Sanitarium. He prescribed his patients individualized diets to help cure their ailments and also experimented with meat substitutes. Helen Mitchell was publicly critical of fad diets, calling out the unscientific nature of them. She was particularly critical of the Dr. Hey diet which said that acidic and alkaline foods could not be digested together, she considered these claims irrational and believed they discredited the field of nutrition. Mitchell thought that fad diets undermine the legitimate contributions to the field of nutrition by scientists.

== Selected publications ==
- Nutrition in Health and Disease (with Edith Michael Barber; Lenna Frances Cooper, 1928)
- Facts, Fads and Frauds in Nutrition (with Gladys Mae Cook, 1937)
- Food Fads, Facts, and Fancies (1939)
- What Educators Should Know About the National Nutrition Program (1941)
- Don't Be Fooled by Fads (1958)
- Recommended and Non-recommended Nutrition Books for Lay Readers (1964)
- Nutrition in Nursing (with Henderika J. Rynbergen; Marjorie V. Dibble; Linnea Anderson, 1968)
