= Traffic light rating system =

Use of colours to indicate a status

A traffic light rating system is a system for indicating the status of a variable using the red, amber or green of traffic lights.

== Product labelling ==
=== Food and drink ===
Food may be labelled with a traffic light label showing how much fat, saturated fats, sugar and salt are in that food by using the traffic light signals for high (red), medium (amber) and low (green) percentages for each of these ingredients. Foods with 'green' indicators are healthier and to be preferred over those with 'red' ones. The label is on the front of the package and easier to spot and interpret than Guideline Daily Amount (GDA) labelling which will continue. The GDA is difficult to understand for many, including children, and does not lend itself to quick comparisons. The use of traffic light labelling is supported by many physician groups including the British Medical Association and welcomed by consumers. Despite worries from some in the food industry that red foods would be shunned, the British Medical Association, Food Standards Agency and others agree that consumers interpret the labels sensibly and realise they can have red foods as a treat, and these labels are easier to understand than lists of percentages.

Food
Substance	Green (low) per 100g	Amber (medium) per 100g	Red (high)
Fat	less than 3g	between 3g and 17.5g	more than 17.5g per 100g or 21g per portion
Saturated fats	less than 1.5g	between 1.5g and 5g	more than 5g per 100g or 6g per portion
Sugar	less than 5g	between 5g and 22.5g	more than 22.5g per 100g or 27g per portion
Salt	less than 0.3g	between 0.3g and 1.5g	more than 1.5g per 100g or 1.8g per portion

Drinks
Substance	Green (low) per 100ml	Amber (medium) per 100ml	Red (high)
Fat	less than 1.5g	between 1.5g and 8.75g	more than 8.75g per 100ml or 10.5g per portion
Saturated fats	less than 0.75g	between 0.75g and 2.5g	more than 2.5g per 100ml or 3g per portion
Sugar	less than 2.5g	between 2.5g and 11.25g	more than 11.25g per 100ml or 13.5g per portion
Salt	less than 0.3g	between 0.3g and 0.75g	more than 0.75g per 100ml or 0.9g per portion

Currently the traffic light label is used in some European countries on a voluntary basis.

=== Other labelling ===
White goods must be labelled with a label indicating energy consumption. This is not strictly a 'traffic light' but by analogy a scale of seven values that run from red to green through intermediate colours.

The system may also be used for the European Game Information System (PEGI), which puts age ratings onto video games. Again this is not strictly a 'traffic light' since there are likely to be more than three colours.

== Performance monitoring ==
In many factories, different stations on the production line(s) are equipped with factory monitoring and control systems; attached to such systems is a 'traffic light' status indicator which is generally visible from many places within the factory. Green typically indicates normal levels of production; amber indicates that production has slowed (or attention is otherwise warranted); red indicates that production has stopped or the line is down.

In the British Civil Service and other departments of the United Kingdom government, traffic light colours are used as a coding system for good or bad performance, usually known as a 'RAG rating'—Red, Amber, Green. For example, a red workload performance would mean inadequate, amber would mean reasonable, and green would mean good. The letters R, A and G are used in addition to swatches of colour, so that the system can be used by colour-blind readers.

=== Project management ===
When status reporting how well a milestone, project, program or portfolio is performing or being delivered, project managers often use a RAG rating to indicate how on track or at risk is the project, its deliverables or tasks.

In some cases, additional colours are adopted to communicate nuances of status. For example, blue to show where milestones or components of a milestone, project, programme, or portfolio are complete—referred to as BRAG (Creator: Sam Rafferty).

== Behavioural ==
Some organisations, such as the U.S. Navy, use traffic light terminology for sexual harassment education. Green light behaviour is normal discussions or actions, such as discussing work or assisting someone on stairs. Amber light behaviour is potentially offensive behavior, such as sexist jokes or patting someone on the behind. Red light behaviour is obvious sexual harassment such as sexual requests.

Various school cafeterias in the United States also use a traffic light like device to monitor noise levels among students. A green light means that students are talking quietly, an amber light means that noise is increasing and that the pupils need to quiet down. At a red light, pupils voices are too loud and the device will emit a loud beeping sound to warn the students to stop talking. A red light can also result in disciplinary action from teachers such as reduced recess time.

== See also ==
- Nutri-Score
- Nutrition facts label
- Nutritional rating systems
- Penalty card
