= Regulation (EU) No 1169/2011 =

Law on food information in the European Union

Regulation 1169/2011
- European Union regulation
- Title: Regulation (EU) No 1169/2011
- Made by: European Parliament and Council

Other legislation
- Replaces: Directive 2000/13/EC; Directive 90/496/EEC; Commission Directive 87/250/EEC; Commission Directive 1999/10/EC; Commission Directive 2002/67/EC; Commission Directive 2008/5/EC; Commission Regulation (EC) No 608/2004
- Amends: Regulation (EC) No 1924/2006; Regulation (EC) No 1925/2006

Regulation (EU) No 1169/2011 on the provision of food information to consumers (Note: Full title: Regulation (EU) No 1169/2011 of the European Parliament and of the Council of 25 October 2011 on the provision of food information to consumers, amending Regulations (EC) No 1924/2006 and (EC) No 1925/2006 of the European Parliament and of the Council, and repealing Commission Directive 87/250/EEC, Council Directive 90/496/EEC, Commission Directive 1999/10/EC, Directive 2000/13/EC of the European Parliament and of the Council, Commission Directives 2002/67/EC and 2008/5/EC and Commission Regulation (EC) No 608/2004) is the main law relating to food information in the European Union. There are other EU laws that specify the rules for particular types of foods.

The principles governing mandatory food information is in Article 4, and the list of mandatory particulars in Article 9. Any Union measure in the field of food information law which is likely to have an effect on public health shall be adopted after consultation with the European Food Safety Authority, per Article 5. Further, food information shall not be misleading, per Article 7. Rules on naming food are provided in Article 17.

Article 15 (language requirements) provides that "mandatory food information shall appear in a language easily understood by the consumers of the Member States where a food is marketed. Within their own territory, the Member States in which a food is marketed may stipulate that the particulars shall be given in one or more languages from among the official languages of the Union."

== Vegetarian food ==
In 2019, news reports suggested that this regulation (in particular Article 17) prevented the use of vegetarian food labels in the EU, such as the common terms veggie burger, vegetarian sausage, and so forth.
