= Reference Daily Intake =

US/Canada food nutrient labelling system

In the U.S. and Canada, the Reference Daily Intake (RDI) is used in nutrition labeling on food and dietary supplement products to indicate the daily intake level of a nutrient that is considered to be sufficient to meet the requirements of 97–98% of healthy individuals in every demographic in the United States. While developed for the US population, it has been adopted by Canada.

The RDI is used to determine the Daily Value (DV) of foods, which is printed on nutrition facts labels (as %DV) in the United States and Canada, and is regulated by the Food and Drug Administration (FDA) and by Health Canada, respectively. The labels "high", "rich in", or "excellent source of" may be used for a food if it contains 20% or more of the DV. The labels "good source", "contains", or "provides" may be used on a food if it contains between 10% and 20% of the DV, and "low source" applies if the %DV is 5% or lower.

The Recommended Dietary Allowances (RDAs) were a set of nutrition recommendations that evolved into both the Dietary Reference Intake (DRI) system of nutrition recommendations (which still defines RDA values) and the RDIs used for food labeling. The first regulations governing U.S. nutrition labels specified a % U.S. RDA declaration based on the current RDA values, which had been published in 1968. Later, the % U.S. RDA was renamed the %DV and the RDA values that the %DVs were based on became the RDIs.

The RDAs (and later the RDA values within the DRI) were regularly revised to reflect the latest scientific information, but although the nutrition labeling regulations were occasionally updated, the existing RDI values were not changed, so that until 2016, many of the DVs used on nutrition facts labels were still based on the outdated RDAs from 1968. In 2016, the Food and Drug Administration published changes to the regulations including updated RDIs and DVs based primarily on the RDAs in the current DRI.

== Food labeling reference tables ==
The reference dietary intake (RDI) gives numbers based on gender and age. The Daily Value (DV) is put on the labels of food products and is meant for the general population.

=== Daily Values ===
The FDA issued a final rule on changes to the facts panel on May 27, 2016. The new values were published in the Federal Register. The original deadline to be in compliance was July 28, 2018, but on May 4, 2018, the FDA released a final rule that extended the deadline to January 1, 2020, for manufacturers with $10 million or more in annual food sales, and by January 1, 2021, for manufacturers with less than $10 million in annual food sales. During the first six months following the January 1, 2020 compliance date, the FDA worked cooperatively with manufacturers to meet the new Nutrition Facts label requirements, and did not focus on enforcement actions regarding these requirements during that time.

=== Labeling requirements ===
As of 2024, the FDA requires manufacturers to display the contents and %DVs of certain nutrients on packaged food or supplement labels, with the instruction:

The Nutrition Facts label must list total fat, saturated fat, trans fat, cholesterol, sodium, total carbohydrate, dietary fiber, total sugars, added sugars, protein, and certain vitamins and minerals. While the actual amount and %DV of vitamin D, calcium, iron, and potassium must be listed, other vitamins and minerals may be listed voluntarily by the manufacturer.

However, they are required to list any vitamins and minerals that are added to the food or if a statement is made on the package labeling about their health effects or the amount contained in the food (for example, "high" or "low").

Similarly, the Supplement Facts label is required to list the same nutrients as the Nutrition Facts label when any of these nutrients are found in the supplement in an amount considered to be greater than zero.

The following table lists the DVs based on a caloric intake of 2000 kcal (8400 kJ), for adults and children four or more years of age, as of 2024.

Nutrient	DV
Total fat	78 g
Saturated fatty acids	20 g
Cholesterol	300 mg
Sodium	2300 mg
Potassium	4700 mg
Total carbohydrate	275 g
Added sugars	50 g
Dietary fiber	28 g (Note: based on 14 g/1000 Calories and a 2,000-Calorie diet)
Protein	50 g (Note: based on 10% of a 2,000-Calorie diet)

==== Vitamins and choline ====
Micronutrient	DV
Vitamin A	900 μg
Vitamin C	90 mg
Vitamin D	20 μg
Vitamin E	15 mg alpha-tocopherol
Vitamin K	120 μg
Thiamin	1.2 mg
Riboflavin	1.3 mg
Niacin	16 mg
Pantothenic acid	5 mg
Vitamin B6	1.7 mg
Vitamin B12	2.4 μg
Biotin	30 μg
Folate	400 μg
Choline	550 mg

==== Minerals ====
Micronutrient	DV
Calcium	1300 mg
Chromium	35 μg
Copper	0.9 mg
Iodine	150 μg
Iron	18 mg
Magnesium	420 mg
Manganese	2.3 mg
Molybdenum	45 μg
Phosphorus	1250 mg
Selenium	55 μg
Zinc	11 mg
Potassium	4700 mg
Sodium	2300 mg
Chloride	2300 mg

== History ==
Dietary reference intakes

The RDI is derived from the RDAs, which were first developed during World War II by Lydia J. Roberts, Hazel Stiebeling and Helen S. Mitchell, all part of a committee established by the U.S. National Academy of Sciences to investigate issues of nutrition that might "affect national defense" (Nestle, p 35). The committee was renamed the Food and Nutrition Board in 1941, after which they began to deliberate on a set of recommendations for a standard daily allowance for each type of nutrient. The standards would be used for nutrition recommendations for the armed forces, civilians, and overseas populations who might need food relief. Roberts, Stiebeling, and Mitchell surveyed all available data, created a tentative set of allowances for "energy and eight nutrients", and submitted them to experts for review (Nestle, p 35). The final set of guidelines, called RDAs for Recommended Dietary Allowances, was accepted in 1941. The allowances were meant to provide superior nutrition for civilians and military personnel, so they included a "margin of safety". Because of food rationing during the war, the food guides created by government agencies to direct citizens' nutritional intake also took food availability into account.

The Food and Nutrition Board subsequently revised the RDAs every five to ten years. In 1973, the FDA introduced regulations to specify the format of nutrition labels when present, although the inclusion of such labels was largely voluntary, only being required if nutrition claims were made or if nutritional supplements were added to the food. The nutrition labels were to include percent U.S. RDA based on the 1968 RDAs in effect at the time. The RDAs continued to be updated (in 1974, 1980 and 1989) but the values specified for nutrition labeling remained unchanged.

In 1993, the FDA published new regulations mandating the inclusion of a nutrition facts label on most packaged foods. Originally the FDA had proposed replacing the percent U.S. RDAs with percent daily values based on the 1989 RDAs but the Dietary Supplement Act of 1992 prevented it from doing so. Instead, it introduced the RDI to be the basis of the new daily values. The RDI consisted of the existing U.S. RDA values (still based on the 1968 RDAs as the FDA was not allowed to change them at the time) and new values for additional nutrients not included in the 1968 RDAs.

In 1997, at the suggestion of the Institute of Medicine of the National Academy, the RDAs became one part of a broader set of dietary guidelines called the Dietary Reference Intake used by both the United States and Canada. As part of the DRI, the RDAs continued to be updated.

On May 27, 2016, the FDA updated the regulations to change the RDI and Daily Values to reflect current scientific information. Until this time, the Daily Values were still largely based on the 1968 RDAs. The new regulations make several other changes to the nutrition facts label to facilitate consumer understanding of the calorie and nutrient contents of their foods, emphasizing nutrients of current concern, such as vitamin D and potassium. The revision to the regulations came into effect on 26 July 2016 and initially stipulated that larger manufacturers must comply within two years while smaller manufacturers had an additional year. On May 4, 2018, the FDA released a final rule that extended the deadline to January 1, 2020, for large companies and to January 1, 2021, for small companies. During the first six months following the January 1, 2020 compliance date, the FDA worked cooperatively with manufacturers to meet the new Nutrition Facts label requirements and did not focus on enforcement actions regarding these requirements during that time.

== Sodium and potassium ==
In 2010, the U.S. Institute of Medicine determined that the government should establish new consumption standards for salt to reduce the amount of sodium in the typical American diet below levels associated with higher risk of several cardiovascular diseases, yet maintain consumer preferences for salt-flavored food. In 1999, the average American adult ingested nearly 4,000 mg of sodium daily, far above the National Research Council recommendation that the general U.S. population consume no more than 2,400 mg of sodium (or 6 grams of salt) per day. For instance, the National Research Council said in 1989 that 500 milligrams of sodium per day (approximately 1,250 milligrams of table salt) "might be" a safe minimum level, based on estimated and assumed obligatory urinary, fecal, and dermal losses. In the United Kingdom, the daily allowance for salt is 6 g (approximately 1.2 teaspoons, about the upper limit in the U.S.), an amount considered "too high".

The Institute of Medicine advisory stated (daily intake basis): "Americans consume more than 3,400 milligrams of sodium – the amount in about 1.5 teaspoons of salt (8.7 g) – each day. The recommended maximum daily intake of sodium – the amount above which health problems appear – is 2,300 milligrams per day for adults, about 1 teaspoon of salt (5.9 g). The recommended adequate intake of sodium is 1,500 milligrams (3.9 g salt) per day, and people over 50 need even less."

The Daily Value for potassium, 4,700 mg per day, was based on a study of men who were given 14.6 g of sodium chloride per day and treated with potassium supplements until the frequency of salt sensitivity was reduced to 20%.

== See also ==
- Dietary Reference Intake – US system of nutrition recommendations
- Dietary Reference Values – EU/UK system of nutritional advice
- Essential nutrient
