= C2H6O3S =

The molecular formula C_{2}H_{6}O_{3}S (molar mass: 110.13 g/mol, exact mass: 110.0038 u) may refer to:

- Dimethyl sulfite
- Ethanesulfonic acid (esylic acid)
- Methyl methanesulfonate
