= Mir-367 microRNA precursor family =

mir-367

Identifiers
- Symbol: mir-367
- Rfam: RF00735
- miRBase family: MIPF0000162

Other data
- RNA type: microRNA
- Domain: Eukaryota;
- PDB structures: PDBe

In molecular biology mir-367 microRNA is a short RNA molecule. MicroRNAs function to regulate the expression levels of other genes by several mechanisms.

miR302/367 cluster, together with Hdac2 inhibition, reprograms human and mouse fibroblasts to iPS cells, faster and more efficient than the custom viral infection (OSKM) strategy. Expression of miR367 is essential for Oct4 expression and miR302/367-mediated reprogramming.

== See also ==
- MicroRNA
