= Diethyl sulfite =

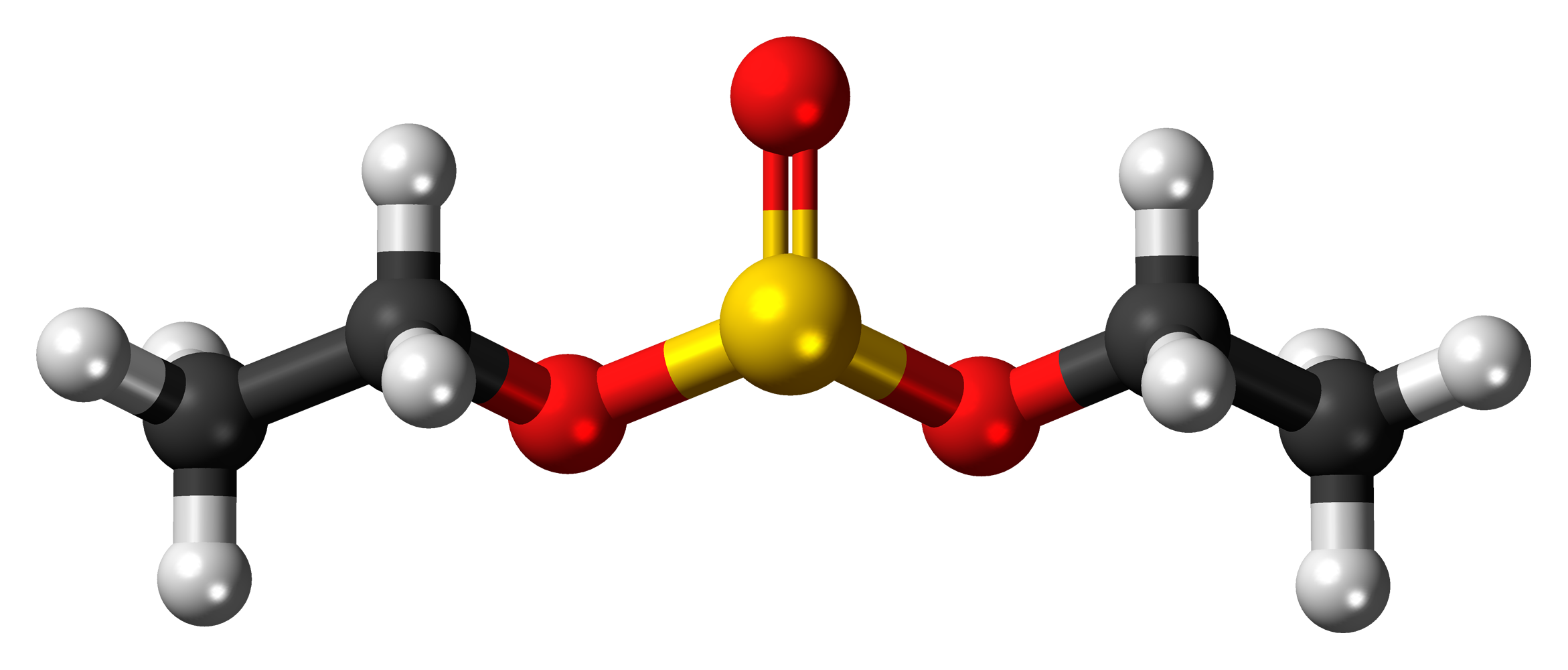

Names
- Preferred IUPAC name Diethyl sulfite
- Other names Diethyl sulphite Sulfurous acid, diethyl ester

Identifiers
CAS Number	623-81-4
3D model (JSmol)	Interactive image; Interactive image
ChemSpider	11697
ECHA InfoCard	100.009.832
EC Number	210-815-5
PubChem CID	12197
UNII	LF6566JT87
CompTox Dashboard (EPA)	DTXSID0060777
- InChI: InChI=1S/C4H10O3S/c1-3-6-8(5)7-4-2/h3-4H2,1-2H3 Key: NVJBFARDFTXOTO-UHFFFAOYSA-N; InChI=1/C4H10O3S/c1-3-6-8(5)7-4-2/h3-4H2,1-2H3 Key: NVJBFARDFTXOTO-UHFFFAOYAE
- SMILES: CCOS(=O)OCC; O=S(OCC)OCC

Properties
Chemical formula	C_{4}H_{10}O_{3}S
Molar mass	138.18 g·mol^{−1}
Appearance	Clear liquid
Density	1.88 g/cm^{3}
Boiling point	158 to 160 °C (316 to 320 °F; 431 to 433 K)
- Except where otherwise noted, data are given for materials in their standard state (at 25 °C [77 °F], 100 kPa). verify (what is ?) Infobox references

Diethyl sulfite (C_{4}H_{10}O_{3}S) is an ester of sulfurous acid. Among other properties, diethyl sulfite inhibits the growth of mold spores during grain storage.

Diethyl sulfite is used as an additive in some polymers to prevent oxidation.

== See also ==
- Dimethyl sulfite
- Diethyl sulfate
- Diethyl sulfoxide
