= Dimethyl sulfoxide =

Organosulfur chemical compound used as a solvent

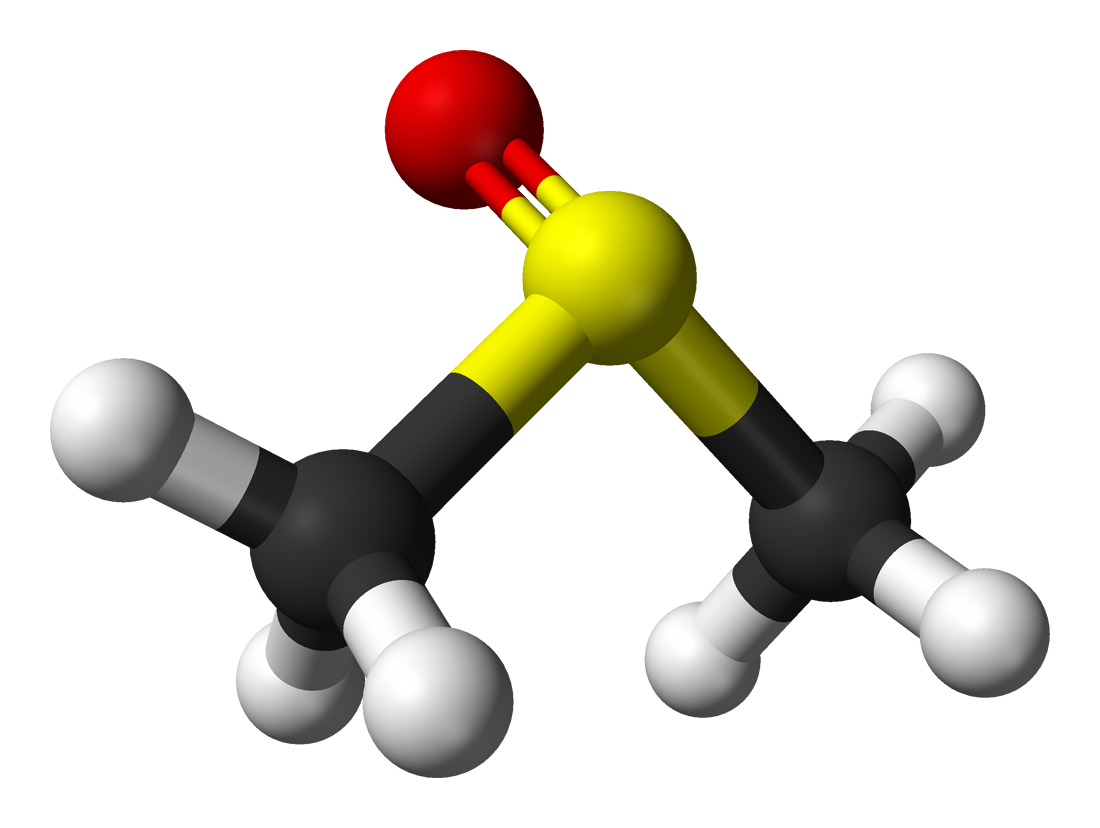
Stereo structural formula of dimethyl sulfoxide with an explicit electron pair and assorted dimensions
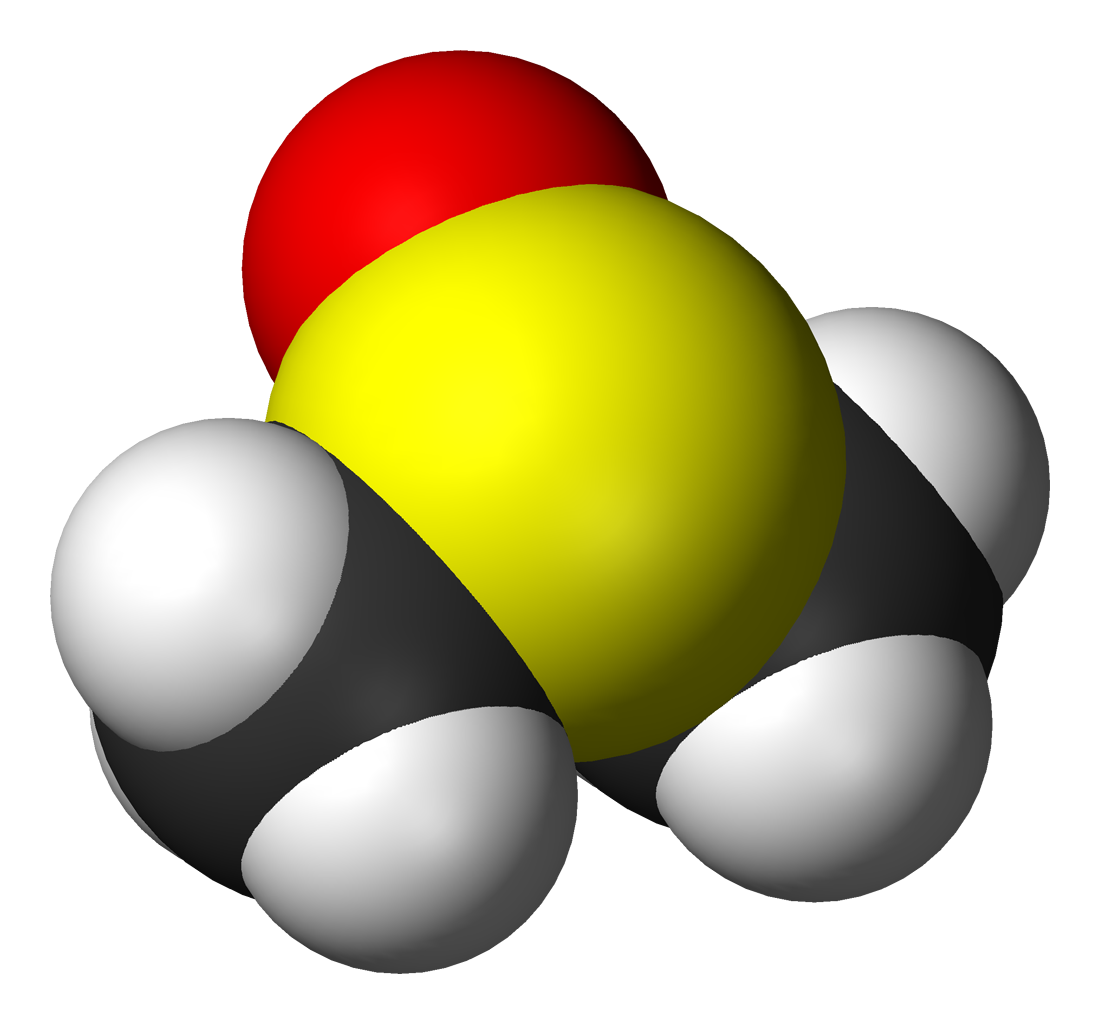
Spacefill model of dimethyl sulfoxide
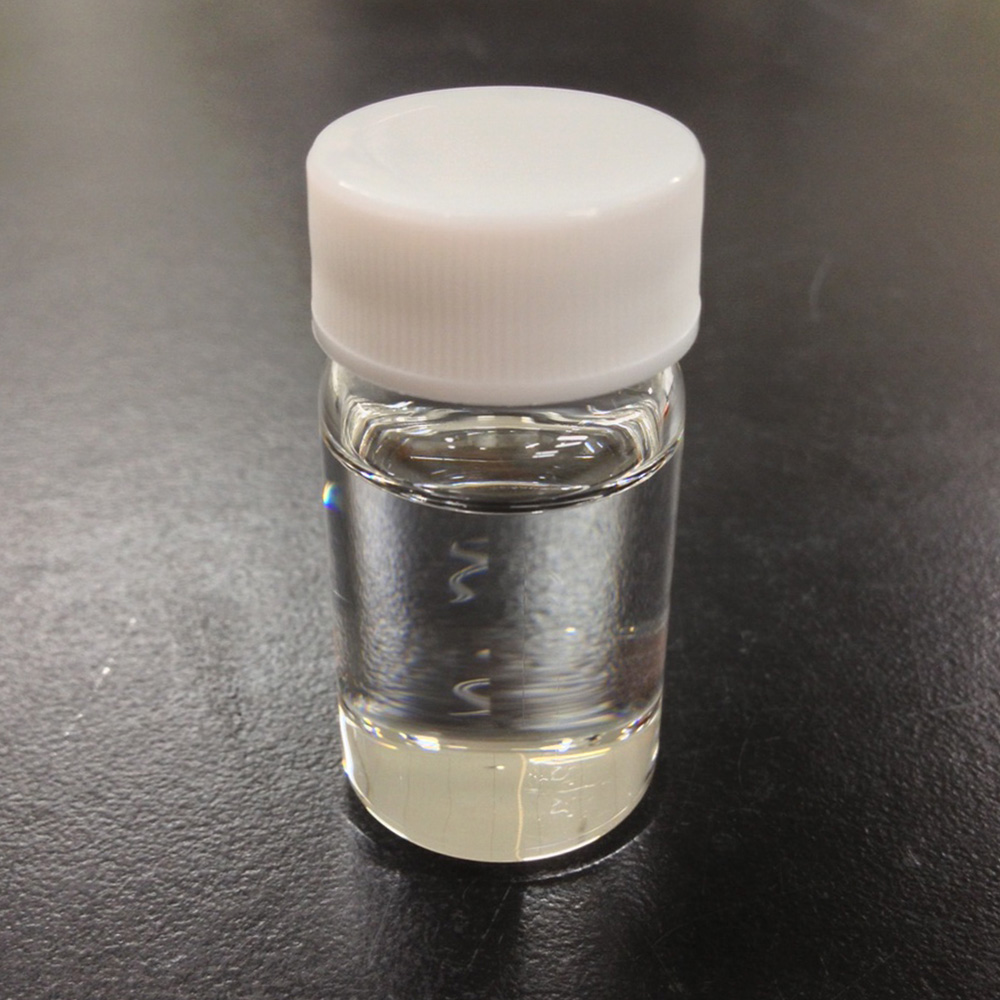
- A sample of dimethyl sulfoxide

Names
- Preferred IUPAC name (Methanesulfinyl)methane
- Systematic IUPAC name (Methanesulfinyl)methane (substitutive); Dimethyl(oxido)sulfur (additive)
- Other names Methylsulfinylmethane; Methyl sulfoxide (2:1), Dermasorb

Identifiers
CAS Number	67-68-5
3D model (JSmol)	Interactive image; Interactive image
Abbreviations	DMSO, Me_{2}SO
Beilstein Reference	506008
ChEBI	CHEBI:28262
ChEMBL	ChEMBL504
ChemSpider	659
DrugBank	DB01093
ECHA InfoCard	100.000.604
EC Number	200-664-3
Gmelin Reference	1556
KEGG	D01043
MeSH	Dimethyl+sulfoxide
PubChem CID	679
RTECS number	PV6210000
UNII	YOW8V9698H
CompTox Dashboard (EPA)	DTXSID2021735
- InChI: InChI=1S/C2H6OS/c1-4(2)3/h1-2H3 Key: IAZDPXIOMUYVGZ-UHFFFAOYSA-N; InChI=1/C2H6OS/c1-4(2)3/h1-2H3 Key: IAZDPXIOMUYVGZ-UHFFFAOYAR
- SMILES: CS(=O)C; CS(C)=O

Properties
Chemical formula	C_{2}H_{6}OS
Molar mass	78.13 g·mol^{−1}
Appearance	Colourless liquid
Density	1.1004 g⋅cm^{−3}
Melting point	19 °C (66 °F; 292 K)
Boiling point	189 °C (372 °F; 462 K)
Solubility in water	Miscible
Solubility in Diethyl ether	Not soluble
Vapor pressure	0.556 millibars or 0.0556 kPa at 20 °C
Acidity (pK_{a})	35
Refractive index (n_{D})	1.479 ε_{r} = 48
Viscosity	1.996 cP at 20 °C

Structure
Point group	C_{s}
Molecular shape	Trigonal pyramidal
Dipole moment	3.96 D

Pharmacology
ATC code	G04BX13 (WHO) M02AX03 (WHO)

Hazards
- Occupational safety and health (OHS/OSH)
Main hazards	Irritant
NFPA 704 (fire diamond)	1 2 0
Flash point	89 °C (192 °F; 362 K)
Safety data sheet (SDS)	Sigma-Aldrich SDS

Related compounds
Related sulfoxides	Diethyl sulfoxide
Related compounds	Sodium methylsulfinylmethylide, Dimethyl sulfide, Dimethyl sulfone, Acetone

Supplementary data page
- Dimethyl sulfoxide (data page)
- Except where otherwise noted, data are given for materials in their standard state (at 25 °C [77 °F], 100 kPa). verify (what is ?) Infobox references

Dimethyl sulfoxide (DMSO) is an organosulfur compound with the formula (CH_{3})_{2}S=O. This colorless liquid is the sulfoxide most widely used commercially. It is an important polar aprotic solvent that dissolves both polar and nonpolar compounds and is miscible in a wide range of organic solvents as well as water. It has a relatively high boiling point. DMSO is metabolised to compounds that leave a garlic-like taste in the mouth after DMSO is absorbed by the skin.

In terms of chemical structure, the molecule has idealized C_{s} symmetry. It has a trigonal pyramidal molecular geometry consistent with other three-coordinate S(IV) compounds, with a nonbonded electron pair on the approximately tetrahedral sulfur atom.

== Synthesis and production ==
Dimethyl sulfoxide was first synthesized in 1866 by the Russian scientist Alexander Zaytsev, who reported his findings in 1867. Its modern use as an industrial solvent began through popularization by Thor Smedslund at the Stepan Chemical Company. Dimethyl sulfoxide is produced industrially from dimethyl sulfide, a by-product of the kraft process, by oxidation with oxygen or nitrogen dioxide.

== Reactions ==
=== Reactions with electrophiles ===
The sulfur center in DMSO is nucleophilic toward soft electrophiles and the oxygen is nucleophilic toward hard electrophiles. With methyl iodide it forms trimethylsulfoxonium iodide, [(CH_{3})_{3}SO]^{+}I^{−}:

(CH_{3})_{2}SO + CH_{3}I → [(CH_{3})_{3}SO]I

This salt can be deprotonated with sodium hydride to form the sulfur ylide:

[(CH_{3})_{3}SO]I + NaH → (CH_{3})_{2}S(CH_{2})O + NaI + H_{2}

=== Acidity ===
The methyl groups of DMSO are only weakly acidic, with a pK_{a} = 35. For this reason, the basicities of many weakly basic organic compounds have been examined in this solvent.

Deprotonation of DMSO requires strong bases like lithium diisopropylamide and sodium hydride. Stabilization of the resultant carbanion is provided by the S(O)R group. The sodium derivative of DMSO formed in this way is referred to as dimsyl sodium. It is a base, e.g., for the deprotonation of ketones to form sodium enolates, phosphonium salts to form Wittig reagents, and formamidinium salts to form diaminocarbenes. The dimsyl anion is a potent nucleophile.

=== Oxidant ===
In organic synthesis, DMSO is used as a mild oxidant. It forms the basis of several selective sulfonium-based oxidation reactions including the Pfitzner–Moffatt oxidation, Corey–Kim oxidation and the Swern oxidation. The Kornblum oxidation is conceptually similar. These methods all involve formation of an intermediate sulfonium species (R_{2}S^{+}OX) where X is a heteroatom attached to oxygen).

=== Ligand and Lewis base ===
Related to its ability to dissolve many salts, DMSO is a common ligand in coordination chemistry. Illustrative is the complex dichlorotetrakis(dimethyl sulfoxide)ruthenium(II) (RuCl_{2}(dmso)_{4}). In this complex, three DMSO ligands are bonded to ruthenium through sulfur. The fourth DMSO is bonded through oxygen. In general, the oxygen-bonded mode is more common.

In carbon tetrachloride solutions DMSO functions as a Lewis base with a variety of Lewis acids such as I_{2}, phenols, trimethyltin chloride, metalloporphyrins, and the dimer Rh_{2}Cl_{2}(CO)_{4}. The donor properties are discussed in the ECW model. The relative donor strength of DMSO toward a series of acids, versus other Lewis bases, can be illustrated by C-B plots.

== Applications ==
=== Solvent ===
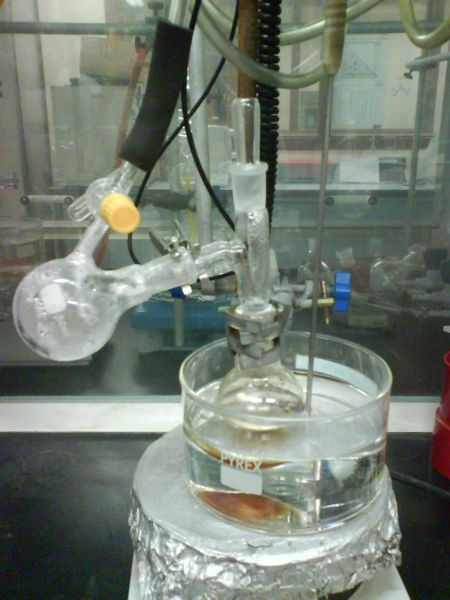
Distillation of DMSO requires a partial vacuum to achieve a lower boiling point.

DMSO is a polar aprotic solvent and is less toxic than other members of this class, such as dimethylformamide, dimethylacetamide, N-methyl-2-pyrrolidone, and hexamethylphosphoramide (HMPA). DMSO is frequently used as a solvent for chemical reactions involving salts, most notably Finkelstein reactions and other nucleophilic substitutions. It is also extensively used as an extractant in biochemistry and cell biology. Because DMSO is only weakly acidic, it tolerates relatively strong bases and as such has been extensively used in the study of carbanions. A set of non-aqueous pK_{a} values (C-H, O-H, S-H and N-H acidities) for thousands of organic compounds have been determined in DMSO solution.

Because of its high boiling point, 189 °C (372 °F), DMSO evaporates slowly at normal atmospheric pressure. Samples dissolved in DMSO cannot as easily be recovered compared to other solvents, as it is very difficult to remove all traces of DMSO by conventional rotary evaporation. One technique to fully recover samples is removal of the organic solvent by evaporation followed by addition of water (to dissolve DMSO) and cryodesiccation to remove both DMSO and water. Reactions conducted in DMSO are often diluted with water to precipitate or phase-separate products. The relatively high freezing point of DMSO, 18.5 °C (65.3 °F), means that at, or just below, room temperature it is a solid.

In its deuterated form (DMSO-d_{6}), it is a useful solvent for NMR spectroscopy, again due to its ability to dissolve a wide range of analytes, the simplicity of its own spectrum, and its suitability for high-temperature NMR spectroscopic studies. Disadvantages to the use of DMSO-d_{6} are its high viscosity, which broadens signals, and its hygroscopicity, which leads to an overwhelming H_{2}O resonance in the ^{1}H-NMR spectrum. It can be mixed with CDCl_{3} or CD_{2}Cl_{2} for lower viscosity and melting points.

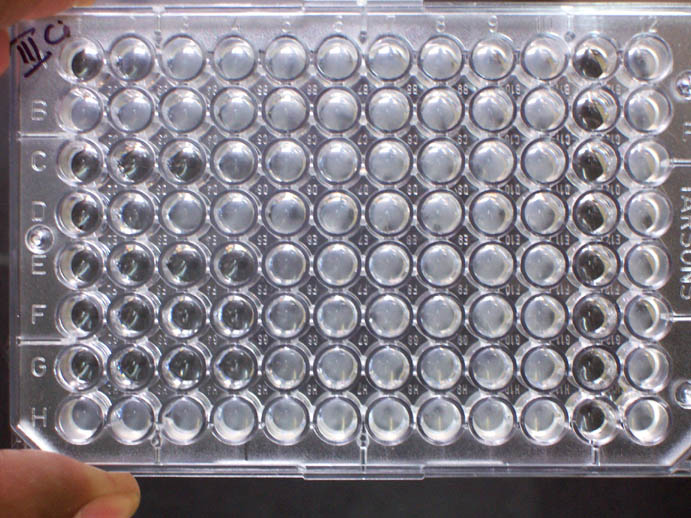
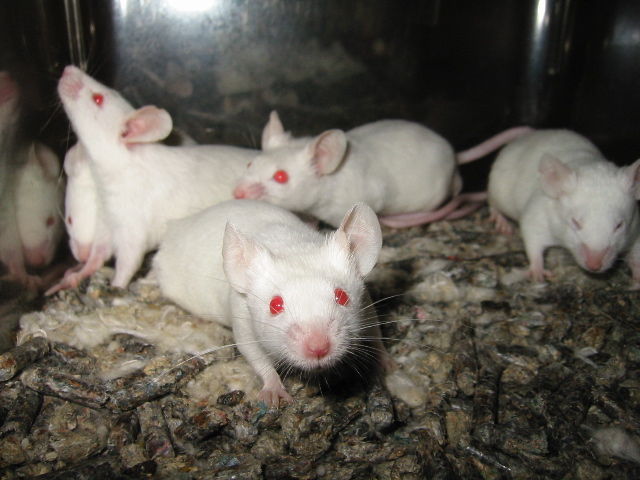
DMSO is used as a solvent in in vitro and in vivo drug testing.

DMSO is used to dissolve test compounds in in vitro drug discovery and drug design screening programs, including high-throughput screening programs. This is because it is able to dissolve both polar and nonpolar compounds, can be used to maintain stock solutions of test compounds (important when working with a large chemical library), is readily miscible with water and cell culture media, and has a high boiling point (this improves the accuracy of test compound concentrations by reducing room temperature evaporation). One limitation with DMSO is that it can affect cell line growth and viability, with low DMSO concentrations sometimes stimulating cell growth, and high DMSO concentrations sometimes inhibiting or killing cells.

DMSO is used as a vehicle in in vivo studies of test compounds. It has, for example, been employed as a co-solvent to assist absorption of the flavonol glycoside icariin in the nematode worm Caenorhabditis elegans. As with its use in in vitro studies, DMSO has some limitations in animal models. Pleiotropic effects can occur and, if DMSO control groups are not carefully planned, then solvent effects can falsely be attributed to the prospective drug. For example, even a very low dose of DMSO has a powerful protective effect against paracetamol (acetaminophen)-induced liver injury in mice.

DMSO finds some use in manufacturing processes to produce microelectronic devices. It is widely used to strip photoresist in TFT-LCD 'flat panel' displays and advanced packaging applications (such as wafer-level packaging / solder bump patterning).

DMSO is also an excellent swelling agent for cellulosic fibres, and occasionally is utilised as solvent in some laboratory analyses respecting wood or fibre related quality control.

=== Biology ===
DMSO is used in the polymerase chain reaction (PCR) to inhibit secondary structures in the DNA template or the DNA primers. It is added to the PCR mix before reacting, where it interferes with the self-complementarity of the DNA, minimizing interfering reactions.

DMSO in a PCR is applicable for supercoiled plasmids (to relax before amplification) or DNA templates with high GC-content (to decrease thermostability). For example, 10% final concentration of DMSO in the PCR mixture with Phusion decreases primer annealing temperature (i.e., primer melting temperature) by 5.5–6.0 °C (9.9–10.8 °F).

It is well known as a reversible cell cycle arrester at phase G1 of human lymphoid cells.

DMSO may also be used as a cryoprotectant, added to cell media to reduce ice formation and thereby prevent cell death during the freezing process. Approximately 10% may be used with a slow-freeze method, and the cells may be frozen at −80 °C (−112 °F) or stored in liquid nitrogen safely.

In cell culture, DMSO is used to induce differentiation of P19 embryonic carcinoma cells into cardiomyocytes and skeletal muscle cells.

=== Medicine ===
Use of DMSO in medicine dates from around 1963, when an Oregon Health & Science University Medical School team, headed by Stanley Jacob, discovered it could penetrate the skin and other membranes without damaging them and could carry other compounds into a biological system. In medicine, DMSO is predominantly used as a topical analgesic, a vehicle for topical application of pharmaceuticals, as an anti-inflammatory, and an antioxidant. Because DMSO increases the rate of absorption of some compounds through biological tissues, including skin, it is used in some transdermal drug delivery systems. Its effect may be enhanced with the addition of EDTA. It is frequently compounded with antifungal medications, enabling them to penetrate not just skin but also toenails and fingernails.

DMSO has been examined for the treatment of numerous conditions and ailments, but the U.S. Food and Drug Administration (FDA) has approved its use only for the symptomatic relief of patients with interstitial cystitis. A 1978 study concluded that DMSO brought significant relief to the majority of the 213 patients with inflammatory genitourinary disorders that were studied.

In 2009, the first to obtain FDA approval for topical DMSO usage was PENNSAID, which contains diclofenac in a carrier with 45.5% DMSO

Each 1 mL of TDiclo contains 16.05 mg diclofenac sodium. TDiclo solution also contains 45.5% dimethyl sulfoxide (DMSO) vehicle, which can result in enhanced penetration of active drug through the skin. The most common adverse event reported was dry skin at the application site (25.3% of patients), followed by contact dermatitis (13.0%)

In interventional radiology, DMSO is used as a solvent for ethylene vinyl alcohol in the Onyx liquid embolic agent, which is used in embolization, the therapeutic occlusion of blood vessels.

In cryobiology DMSO has been used as a cryoprotectant and is still an important constituent of cryoprotectant vitrification mixtures used to preserve organs, tissues, and cell suspensions. Without it, up to 90% of frozen cells will become inactive. It is particularly important in the freezing and long-term storage of embryonic stem cells and hematopoietic stem cells, which are often frozen in a mixture of 10% DMSO, a freezing medium, and 30% fetal bovine serum. In the cryogenic freezing of heteroploid cell lines (MDCK, VERO, etc.) a mixture of 10% DMSO with 90% EMEM (70% EMEM + 30% fetal bovine serum + antibiotic mixture) is used. As part of an autologous bone marrow transplant the DMSO is re-infused along with the patient's own hematopoietic stem cells.

DMSO is metabolized by disproportionation to dimethyl sulfide and dimethyl sulfone. It is subject to renal and pulmonary excretion. A possible side effect of DMSO is therefore elevated blood dimethyl sulfide, which may cause a blood borne halitosis symptom.

=== Alternative medicine ===
DMSO's popularity as an alternative medicine is stated to stem from a March 1980 60 Minutes report, "The Riddle of DMSO", and an April 1980 Time magazine article reporting the treatments of Stanley Jacob beginning in the 1960s.

The use of DMSO as an alternative treatment for cancer is of particular concern, as it has been shown to interfere with a variety of chemotherapy drugs, including cisplatin, carboplatin, and oxaliplatin. There is insufficient evidence to support the hypothesis that DMSO has any beneficial effect, and most sources agree that its history of side effects when tested warrants caution when using it as a dietary supplement, for which it is marketed heavily with the usual disclaimer. DMSO is an ingredient in some products listed by the U.S. FDA as fake cancer cures and the FDA has had a running battle with distributors. One such distributor is Mildred Miller, who promoted DMSO for a variety of disorders and was consequently convicted of Medicare fraud.

=== Veterinary medicine ===
DMSO is commonly used in veterinary medicine as a liniment for horses, alone or in combination with other ingredients. In the latter case, often, the intended function of the DMSO is as a solvent, to carry the other ingredients across the skin. Also in horses, DMSO is used intravenously, again alone or in combination with other drugs. It is used alone for the treatment of increased intracranial pressure and/or cerebral edema in horses.

=== Taste ===
The perceived garlic taste upon skin contact with DMSO may be due to nonolfactory activation of TRPA1 receptors in trigeminal ganglia. Unlike dimethyl and diallyl disulfides (which have odors resembling garlic), mono- and tri- sulfides (which typically have foul odors), and similar odiferous sulfur compounds, the pure chemical DMSO is odorless.

== Safety ==
=== Toxicity ===
DMSO is a non-toxic solvent with a median lethal dose higher than ethanol (DMSO: LD_{50}, oral, rat, 14,500 mg/kg; ethanol: LD_{50}, oral, rat, 7,060 mg/kg).

DMSO can cause contaminants, toxins, and medicines to be absorbed through the skin, which may cause unexpected effects. DMSO is thought to increase the effects of blood thinners, steroids, heart medicines, sedatives, and other drugs. In some cases this could be harmful or dangerous.

Because DMSO easily penetrates the skin, substances dissolved in DMSO may quickly be absorbed. Glove selection is important when working with DMSO. Butyl rubber, fluoroelastomer, neoprene, or thick (15 mil / 0.4 mm) latex gloves are recommended. Nitrile gloves, which are very commonly used in chemical laboratories, may protect from brief contact but have been found to degrade rapidly with exposure to DMSO.

==== Pharmacodynamic study ====
Considering its wide use, especially for cryopreservation and in vitro assays, we evaluated biological effect of DMSO using these technological innovations. We exposed 3D cardiac and hepatic microtissues to medium with or without 0.1% DMSO and analyzed the transcriptome, proteome and DNA methylation profiles. In both tissue types, transcriptome analysis detected >2000 differentially expressed genes affecting similar biological processes, thereby indicating consistent cross-organ actions of DMSO.

There are transcriptional, translational and epigenetic changes caused by low concentration DMSO, despite the lack of acute toxicity.

This is more of a concern for molecular biology experiments, because human body react transcriptionally to exogenic substances which can be totally normal and benign. For comparison, ethanol produces transcriptional changes that cause metabolic disorder.

=== Regulation ===
In Australia, it is listed as a Schedule 4 (S4) Drug, and a company has been prosecuted for adding it to products as a preservative.

=== Clinical safety ===
Early clinical trials with DMSO were stopped because of questions about its safety, especially its ability to harm the eye. The most commonly reported side effects include headaches and burning and itching on contact with the skin. Strong allergic reactions have been reported.

On September 9, 1965, The Wall Street Journal reported that a manufacturer of the chemical warned that the death of an Irish woman after undergoing DMSO treatment for a sprained wrist may have been due to the treatment, although no autopsy was done, nor was a causal relationship established. Clinical research using DMSO was halted and did not begin again until the National Academy of Sciences (NAS) published findings in favor of DMSO in 1972. In 1978, the US FDA approved DMSO for treating interstitial cystitis. In 1980, the US Congress held hearings on claims that the FDA was slow in approving DMSO for other medical uses. In 2007, the US FDA granted "fast track" designation on clinical studies of DMSO's use in reducing brain tissue swelling following traumatic brain injury.

DMSO exposure to developing mouse brains can produce brain degeneration. This neurotoxicity could be detected at doses as low as 0.3 mL/kg, a level exceeded in children exposed to DMSO during bone marrow transplant.

=== Odor problem ===
DMSO disposed into sewers can cause odor problems in municipal effluents: waste water bacteria transform DMSO under hypoxic (anoxic) conditions into dimethyl sulfide (DMS) that has a strong disagreeable odor, similar to rotten cabbage. However, chemically pure DMSO is odorless because of the lack of C-S-C (sulfide) and C-S-H (mercaptan) linkages. Deodorization of DMSO is achieved by removing the odorous impurities it contains.

=== Explosion hazard ===
Dimethyl sulfoxide can produce an explosive reaction when exposed to acyl chlorides; at a low temperature, this reaction produces the oxidant for Swern oxidation.Mancuso, A.J.; Huang, S.L.; Swern, D. (1978). "Oxidation of long-chain and related alcohols to carbonyls by dimethyl sulfoxide "activated" by oxalyl chloride". J. Org. Chem. 43 (12): 2480–2482. doi:10.1021/jo00406a041.

DMSO can decompose at the boiling temperature of 189 °C at normal pressure, possibly leading to an explosion. The decomposition is catalyzed by acids and bases and therefore can be relevant at even lower temperatures. A strong to explosive reaction also takes place in combination with halogen compounds, metal nitrides, metal perchlorates, sodium hydride, periodic acid and fluorinating agents.

== See also ==
- Varying oxidation of sulfur
  - Dimethyl sulfide (DMS), the corresponding sulfide, also produced by marine phytoplankton and emitted to the oceanic atmosphere where it is oxidized to DMSO, SO_{2} and sulfate
  - Dimethyl sulfone, commonly known as methylsulfonylmethane (MSM), a related chemical often marketed as a dietary supplement
- Related compounds with methyl on oxygen
  - Dimethyl sulfite, the corresponding sulfite
  - Dimethyl sulfate (also DMS), the corresponding sulfate: a mutagenic alkylating compound
  - Methyl methanesulfonate, another methylating agent
- Death of Gloria Ramirez, where DMSO taken by a terminally ill patient caused medical staff to fall ill
