= OSKM =

OSKM may refer to:

- OSKM (Russian: Одновременная Система с Квадратурной Модуляцией), an early test colour broadcasting at the Soviet Central Television
- OSKM factors, set of reprogramming factor proteins that are used to induce mammal fibroblasts into induced pluripotent stem cell
