= Directed differentiation =

Bioengineering methodology

Directed differentiation is a bioengineering methodology at the interface of stem cell biology, developmental biology and tissue engineering. It is essentially harnessing the potential of stem cells by constraining their differentiation in vitro toward a specific cell type or tissue of interest. Stem cells are by definition pluripotent, able to differentiate into several cell types such as neurons, cardiomyocytes, hepatocytes, etc. Efficient directed differentiation requires a detailed understanding of the lineage and cell fate decision, often provided by developmental biology.

== Conceptual frame ==
During differentiation, pluripotent cells make a number of developmental decisions to generate first the three germ layers (ectoderm, mesoderm and endoderm) of the embryo and intermediate progenitors, followed by subsequent decisions or check points, giving rise to all the body's mature tissues. The differentiation process can be modeled as sequence of binary decisions based on probabilistic or stochastic models. Developmental biology and embryology provides the basic knowledge of the cell types' differentiation through mutation analysis, lineage tracing, embryo micro-manipulation and gene expression studies. Cell differentiation and tissue organogenesis involve a limited set of developmental signaling pathways. It is thus possible to direct cell fate by controlling cell decisions through extracellular signaling, mimicking developmental signals.

== Source material ==
Directed differentiation is primarily applied to pluripotent stem cells (PSCs) of mammalian origin, in particular mouse and human cells for biomedical research applications. Since the discovery of embryonic stem (ES) cells (1981) and induced pluripotent stem (iPS) cells (2006), source material is potentially unlimited. Historically, embryonic carcinoma (EC) cells have also been used. Fibroblasts or other differentiated cell types have been used for direct reprogramming strategies.

== Methods ==
Cell differentiation involves a transition from a proliferative mode toward differentiation mode. Directed differentiation consists in mimicking developmental (embryo's development) decisions in vitro using the stem cells as source material. For this purpose, pluripotent stem cells (PSCs) are cultured in controlled conditions involving specific substrate or extracellular matrices promoting cell adhesion and differentiation, and define culture media compositions. A limited number of signaling factors such as growth factors or small molecules, controlling cell differentiation, is applied sequentially or in a combinatorial manner, at varying dosage and exposure time. Proper differentiation of the cell type of interest is verified by analyzing cell type specific markers, gene expression profile, and functional assays.

=== Early methods ===
- co-culture with stromal cells or feeder cells, and on specific culture substrates:

support cells and matrices provide developmental-like environmental signals.

- 3D cell aggregate formation, termed embryoid bodies (EBs): the aggregate aim at mimicking early embryonic development and instructing the cell differentiation.
- culture in presence of fetal bovine serum, removal of pluripotency factors.

=== Current methodologies ===
==== Directed differentiation ====
This method consists in exposing the cells to specific signaling pathways modulators and manipulating cell culture conditions (environmental or exogenous) to mimick the natural sequence of developmental decisions to produce a given cell type/tissue. A drawback of this approach is the necessity to have a good understanding of how the cell type of interest is formed.

==== Direct reprogramming ====
This method, also known as transdifferentiation or direct conversion, consists in overexpressing one or several factors, usually transcription factors, introduced in the cells. The starting material can be either pluripotent stem cells (PSCs), or either differentiated cell type such as fibroblasts. The principle was first demonstrated in 1987 with the myogenic factors MyoD. A drawback of this approach is the introduction of foreign nucleic acid in the cells and the forced expression of transcription factors which effects are not fully understood.

==== Lineage/cell type-specific selection ====
This methods consists in selecting the cell type of interest, usually with antibiotic resistance. For this purpose, the source material cells are modified to contain antibiotic resistance cassette under a target cell type specific promoter. Only cells committed to the lineage of interest is surviving the selection.

== Applications ==
Directed differentiation provides a potentially unlimited and manipulable source of cell and tissues. Some applications are impaired by the immature phenotype of the pluripotent stem cells (PSCs)-derived cell type, which limits the physiological and functional studies possible. Several application domains emerged:

=== Model system for basic science ===
For basic science, notably developmental biology and cell biology, PSC-derived cells allow to study at the molecular and cellular levels fundamental questions in vitro, that would have been otherwise extremely difficult or impossible to study for technical and ethical reasons in vivo such as embryonic development of human. In particular, differentiating cells are amenable for quantitative and qualitative studies. More complex processes can also be studied in vitro and formation of organoids, including cerebroids, optic cup and kidney have been described.

=== Drug discovery and toxicology ===
Cell types differentiated from pluripotent stem cells (PSCs) are being evaluated as preclinical in vitro models of Human diseases. Human cell types in a dish provide an alternative to traditional preclinical assays using animal, human immortalized cells or primary cultures from biopsies, which have their limitations. Clinically relevant cell types i.e. cell type affected in diseases are a major focus of research, this includes hepatocytes, Langerhans islet beta-cells, cardiomyocytes and neurons. Drug screen are performed on miniaturized cell culture in multiwell-plates or on a chip.

=== Disease modeling ===
PSCs-derived cells from patients are used in vitro to recreate specific pathologies. The specific cell type affected in the pathology is at the base of the model. For example, motoneurons are used to study spinal muscular atrophy (SMA) and cardiomyocytes are used to study arrhythmia. This can allow for a better understanding of the pathogenesis and the development of new treatments through drug discovery. Immature PSC-derived cell types can be matured in vitro by various strategies, such as in vitro ageing, to model age-related disease in vitro. Major diseases being modelized with PSCs-derived cells are amyotrophic lateral sclerosis (ALS), Alzheimer's (AD), Parkinson's (PD), fragile X syndrome (FXS), Huntington disease (HD), Down syndrome, Spinal muscular atrophy (SMA), muscular dystrophies, cystic fibrosis, Long QT syndrome, and Type I diabetes.

=== Regenerative medicine ===
The potentially unlimited source of cell and tissues may have direct application for tissue engineering, cell replacement and transplantation following acute injuries and reconstructive surgery. These applications are limited to the cell types that can be differentiated efficiently and safely from human PSCs with the proper organogenesis. Decellularized organs are also being used as tissue scaffold for organogenesis. Source material can be normal healthy cells from another donor (heterologous transplantation) or genetically corrected from the same patient (autologous). Concerns on patient safety have been raised due to the possibility of contaminating undifferentiated cells. The first clinical trial using hESC-derived cells was in 2011. The first clinical trial using hiPSC-derived cells started in 2014 in Japan.

== See also ==
- Dedifferentiation
- Pluripotency
