= Dimethyl sulfoxide (data page) =

Chemical data page

This page provides supplementary chemical data on dimethyl sulfoxide.

== Material Safety Data Sheet ==
The handling of this chemical may incur notable safety precautions. It is highly recommend that you seek the Material Safety Datasheet (MSDS) for this chemical from a reliable source such as SIRI, and follow its directions.

== Structure and properties ==
Structure and properties
Index of refraction, n_{D}	1.4795 at 20 °C; 1.4787 at 21 °C
Abbe number	?
Dielectric constant, ε_{r}	48 ε_{0} at 20 °C
Bond strength	?
Bond length	?
Bond angle	?
Magnetic susceptibility	?
Surface tension	43 dyn/cm at 20 °C
Viscosity	2.14 mPa·s at 20 °C; 1.1 mPa·s at 27 °C

== Thermodynamic properties ==
Phase behavior
Triple point	291.67 K (18.52 °C), ? Pa
Critical point	720 K (447 °C), 5630 kPa
Std enthalpy change of fusion, Δ_{fus}H^{~~o~~}	14.37 kJ/mol
Std entropy change of fusion, Δ_{fus}S^{~~o~~}	49.26 J/(mol·K)
Std enthalpy change of vaporization, Δ_{vap}H^{~~o~~}	52.9 kJ/mol
Std entropy change of vaporization, Δ_{vap}S^{~~o~~}	? J/(mol·K)
Solid properties
Std enthalpy change of formation, Δ_{f}H^{~~o~~}_{solid}	? kJ/mol
Standard molar entropy, S^{~~o~~}_{solid}	? J/(mol K)
Heat capacity, c_{p}	149.40 J/(mol·K)
Liquid properties
Std enthalpy change of formation, Δ_{f}H^{~~o~~}_{liquid}	−203.4 kJ/mol
Standard molar entropy, S^{~~o~~}_{liquid}	188.78 J/(mol·K)
Enthalpy of combustion, Δ_{c}H^{~~o~~}	−2037.3 kJ/mol
Heat capacity, c_{p}	153 J/(mol·K) at 25 °C
Gas properties
Std enthalpy change of formation, Δ_{f}H^{~~o~~}_{gas}	−150.5 kJ/mol
Standard molar entropy, S^{~~o~~}_{gas}	? J/(mol·K)
Heat capacity, c_{p}	? J/(mol·K)

== Vapor pressure of liquid ==
vapor pressure at 20 °C = 0.556 mbar = 0.417 mmHg

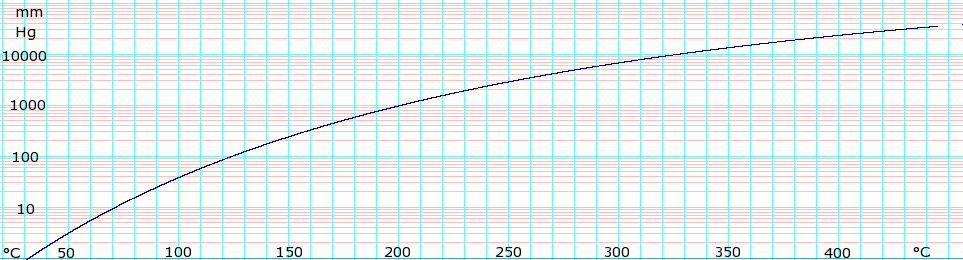
log_{10} of dimethyl sulfoxide vapor pressure. Uses formula $\log_e P_\text{mmHg} = {}$$\log_e \frac{760}{101.325} - 4.215616 \log_e(T+273.15) - \frac {7522.806} {T+273.15} + 46.78064 - 2.450859 \times 10^{-7} (T+273.15)^2$ obtained from CHERIC

== Distillation data ==
Vapor-liquid equilibrium for dimethyl sulfoxide/water P = 550 mm Hg
BP Temp. °C	% by mole water
BP Temp. °C	liquid	vapor
168.4	6.5	34.6
160.9	10.8	51.8
153.1	16.4	62.7
146.4	21.2	71.0
140.6	26.7	78.4
135.1	32.1	83.9
130.8	37.4	87.6
124.3	44.8	91.7
121.0	48.5	93.5
114.9	55.4	96.0
107.8	66.4	98.0
102.1	74.4	98.9
97.2	84.0	99.6
96.3	85.7	99.6
93.9	91.9	99.8

Vapor-liquid equilibrium for dimethyl sulfoxide/ethanol P = 14.665 kPa
BP Temp. °C	% by mole DMSO
BP Temp. °C	liquid	vapor
55.80	48.75	1.0
64.50	59.75	1.6
66.75	64.00	2.5
70.80	71.00	3.6
76.50	76.25	5.0
81.50	80.50	6.0
91.50	85.00	13.0
100.74	90.00	21.0

== Spectral data ==
UV-Vis
λ_{max}	<220 nm
Extinction coefficient, ε	0.0034 %^{−1} cm^{−1} in unpHed water at 260 nm
IR
Spectrum	NIST
Major absorption bands	3000, 2900, 1200–1240, 1000–1080, 960, 690 cm^{−1}
NMR
Proton NMR	2.54((CD_{3})_{2}SO), 2.71 in D_{2}O;
Carbon-13 NMR	40ppm;
Other NMR data
MS
Masses of main fragments
