= Sulfite ester =

Class of chemical compounds

Dimethyl sulfite, the simplest sulfite ester

A sulfite ester (also known as an organosulfite) is a functional group with the structure (RO)(R'O)SO. They are in principle the esters of sulfurous acid, however as the acid cannot be produced they are in practice made via other routes.

They adopt a trigonal pyramidal molecular geometry due to the presence of lone pairs on the sulphur atom. When substituents R and R' differ, the compound is chiral owing to the stereogenic sulphur centre; when the R groups are the same the compound will have idealised C_{s} molecular symmetry.

They are commonly prepared by the reaction of thionyl chloride with alcohols. The reaction is typically performed at room temperature to prevent the alcohol being converted into a chloroalkane. Bases such as pyridine can also be used to promote the reaction:

2 ROH + SOCl_{2} → (RO)_{2}SO + 2 HCl

The pesticides endosulfan and propargite are sulfite esters. Other simple members include ethylene sulfite, dimethyl sulfite, and diphenylsulfite. Many examples have been prepared from diols, such as sugars. Sulfite esters can be powerful alkylation and hydroxyalkylation reagents.
