= Stanley Jacob =

American surgeon (1924–2015)

- Born: January 7, 1924; Chicago, Illinois, U.S.
- Died: January 17, 2015 (aged 91)
- Medical career
- Profession: Surgeon

Stanley W. Jacob (January 7, 1924 – February 6, 2015) was an American surgeon specializing in organ transplantation. He studied dimethyl sulfoxide (also known as DMSO) as head of the organ transplant team at Oregon Health & Science University in the 1960s. He was appointed the Gerlinger Professor of the Department of Surgery at OHSU in 1981. He wrote and edited many books and papers on DMSO and was a book reviewer for JAMA (The Journal of the American Medical Association) until his death.

Jacob was an Army Colonel and served in the Korean War as a captain.
