= Ethyl sulfate =

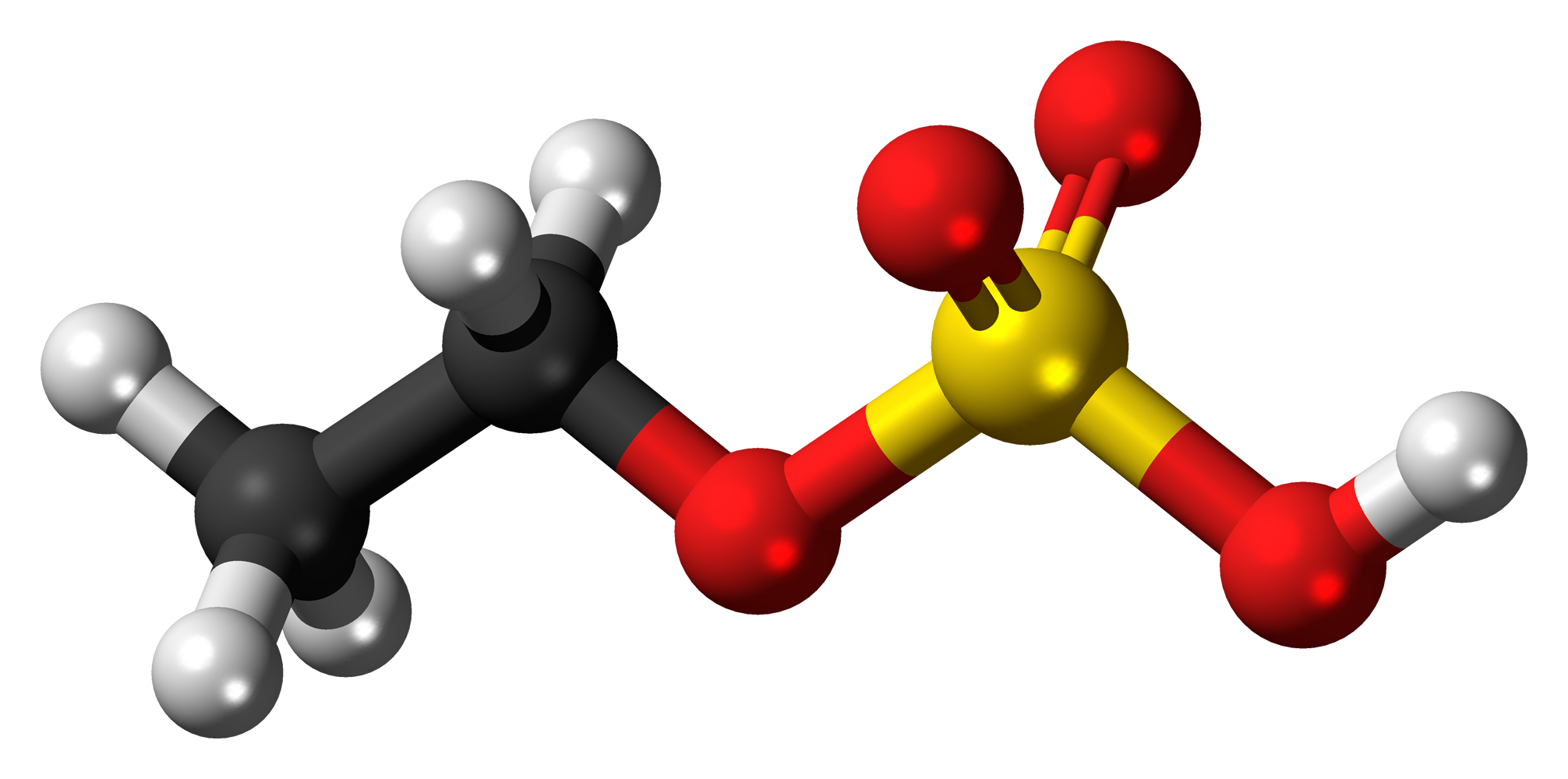

Names
- Preferred IUPAC name Ethyl hydrogen sulfate
- Other names Ethyl sulfate; Sulfovinic acid; Ethyl bisulfate; Ethoxysulfonic acid; Ethyl sulphate

Identifiers
CAS Number	540-82-9
3D model (JSmol)	Interactive image
Abbreviations	EtHSO_{4}
ChemSpider	5782
ECHA InfoCard	100.007.963
PubChem CID	6004
UNII	P3LK0HF3B7
CompTox Dashboard (EPA)	DTXSID10862151
- InChI: InChI=1S/C2H6O4S/c1-2-6-7(3,4)5/h2H2,1H3,(H,3,4,5) Key: KIWBPDUYBMNFTB-UHFFFAOYSA-N; InChI=1/C2H6O4S/c1-2-6-7(3,4)5/h2H2,1H3,(H,3,4,5) Key: KIWBPDUYBMNFTB-UHFFFAOYAR
- SMILES: O=S(=O)(O)OCC

Properties
Chemical formula	C_{2}H_{6}O_{4}S
Molar mass	126.13 g·mol^{−1}
Density	1.46 g/cm^{3}
- Except where otherwise noted, data are given for materials in their standard state (at 25 °C [77 °F], 100 kPa). verify (what is ?) Infobox references

Ethyl sulfate (IUPAC name: ethyl hydrogen sulfate), also known as sulfovinic acid, is an organic chemical compound used as an intermediate in the production of ethanol from ethylene. It is the ethyl ester of sulfuric acid.

== History ==
This substance was studied contemporaneously with ether by German alchemist August Siegmund Frobenius in 1730, subsequently by French chemists Fourcroy in 1797 and Gay-Lussac in 1815. Swiss scientist Nicolas-Théodore de Saussure also studied it in 1807. In 1827, French chemist and pharmacist Félix-Polydore Boullay (1806–1835) along with Jean-Baptiste André Dumas noted the role of ethyl sulfate in the preparation of diethyl ether from sulfuric acid and ethanol. Further studies by the German chemist Eilhard Mitscherlich and the Swedish chemist Jöns Berzelius suggested sulfuric acid was acting as a catalyst, this eventually led to the discovery of sulfovinic acid as an intermediate in the process. The advent of electrochemistry by Italian physicist Alessandro Volta and English chemist Humphry Davy in the 1800s confirmed ether and water were formed by the reaction of sub-stoichiometric amounts of sulfuric acid on ethanol and that sulfovinic acid was formed as an intermediate in the reaction.

== Production ==
Ethanol was produced primarily by the sulfuric acid hydration process in which ethylene is reacted with sulfuric acid to produce ethyl sulfate followed by hydrolysis, but this method has been mostly replaced by direct hydration of ethylene.

Ethyl sulfate can be produced in a laboratory setting by reacting ethanol with sulfuric acid under a gentle boil, while keeping the reaction below 140 °C. The sulfuric acid must be added dropwise or the reaction must be actively cooled because the reaction itself is highly exothermic.

CH_{3}CH_{2}OH + H_{2}SO_{4} → CH_{3}CH_{2}OSO_{3}H + H_{2}O

If the temperature exceeds 140 °C, the ethyl sulfate product tends to react with residual ethanol starting material, producing diethyl ether. If the temperature exceeds 170 °C in a considerable excess of sulfuric acid, the ethyl sulfate breaks down into ethylene and sulfuric acid.

== Reactions ==
The mechanism of the formation of ethyl sulfate, diethyl ether, and ethylene is based on the reaction between ethanol and sulfuric acid, which involves protonation of the ethanolic oxygen to form the oxonium ion.

Ethyl sulfate accumulates in hair after chronic alcohol consumption and its detection can be used as a biomarker for alcohol consumption.

== Salts ==
Ethyl sulfate can exist in salt forms, such as sodium ethyl sulfate, potassium ethyl sulfate, and calcium ethyl sulfate. The salt can be formed by adding the according carbonate, or bicarbonate salt. As an example, ethyl sulfate and potassium carbonate forms potassium ethyl sulfate and potassium bicarbonate.

CH_{3}CH_{2}OSO_{3}H + K_{2}CO_{3} → CH_{3}CH_{2}OSO_{3}K + KHCO_{3}

== See also ==
- Methyl sulfate
- Diethyl sulfate
