= Dedifferentiation =

Cellular process of loss of specialization

Dedifferentiation (/ˌdiːdɪfəˌrɛnʃiˈeɪʃən/) is a transient process by which cells become less specialized and return to an earlier cell state within the same lineage. This suggests an increase in cell potency, meaning that, following dedifferentiation, a cell may possess the ability to re-differentiate into more cell types than it did before dedifferentiation. This is in contrast to differentiation, where differences in gene expression, morphology, or physiology arise in a cell, making its function increasingly specialized.

The loss of specialization observed in dedifferentiation can be noted through changes in gene expression, physiology, function within the organism, proliferative activity, or morphology. While it can be induced in a laboratory setting through processes like direct reprogramming and the production of induced pluripotent stem cells, endogenous dedifferentiation processes also exist as a component of wound healing mechanisms.

== History ==
References to dedifferentiation can be found as far back as 1915, where Charles Manning Child described dedifferentiation as a “return or approach to the embryonic or undifferentiated condition”. While Manning's research was about plants, it helped establish the foundation for our modern-day understanding of dedifferentiation and cell plasticity. Just as plant cells respond to injury by undergoing callus formation via dedifferentiation, some animal models dedifferentiate their cells to form blastema, which are analogous to plant calluses, after limb amputation.

In the 1940s C. H. Waddington created the “Epigenetic Landscape”, a diagrammatic representation of cell fate from less differentiated to more differentiated cell types. Here, the concept of a marble moving downhill through various paths is used to represent cell decision-making and cell potency, thus visualizing how cells can take different paths of differentiation to reach a final state. Dedifferentiation would be represented by the marble moving uphill through the pathways it has already taken until it settles somewhere above the most downhill location.

In our modern-day understanding of dedifferentiation, some controversies remain when defining the boundaries of its definition. Some claim that dedifferentiation is strictly limited to the same cell lineage from which it is derived. However, others say that it can be used to describe a general increase in cell potency.

== Mechanisms ==
The mechanism by which dedifferentiation occurs has not been completely illuminated. The pathways discussed below are found to be closely related to dedifferentiation and regeneration in some species. Because not one pathway has been elucidated as necessary for all dedifferentiation and regeneration, the mechanism may function differently in different species.

=== Observed markers of dedifferentiation ===
For dedifferentiation, genes in the extracellular matrix play an important role. For example, MMP, the matrix metalloproteinase, has shown up-regulated activity during early stages of limb regeneration. Matrix Metalloproteinases are responsible for degradation of both non-matrix and matrix proteins. MMP degrades proteins in the extracellular matrix of a cell, resulting in the destabilization of the differentiated cell identity.

However, the markers selected to represent dedifferentiation can differ according to the tissue and cell types that are being studied. For example, in mice myotubes, dedifferentiation is marked by a decreased expression of Myogenin, a protein present in differentiated myotubes.

=== Involved pathways ===
Some of the pathways that have shown interaction in dedifferentiation are MSX1, Notch 1, BMP, and Wnt/β-catenin.

MSx1, a gene that is a member of the homeobox family, encodes a transcriptional repressor that can prevent differentiation in epithelial and mesenchymal progenitor cell types. This repressor would be able to keep cells undifferentiated during development. Reduced levels of Msx1 expression resulted in an inability to regenerate tadpole tails.

Bone morphogenic proteins (BMPs) are a group of signaling molecules involved in growth and development in many systems, including bone, embryogenesis, and homeostasis. The BMP pathway is necessary for dedifferentiation and regeneration in tadpoles. Downregulation of the BMP pathway led to a downregulation of MSx1, resulting in no regeneration in the tadpole. Once BMP expression was restored, Msx1 expression was also restored, and regeneration proceeded.19 Similar studies have shown similar results in mouse digit tip regeneration.

The Notch1 pathway has demonstrated importance in the regeneration of frog tadpole tails. Notch1 is a gene in the Notch family of proteins. Notch proteins are part of an intercellular signaling pathway responsible for regulating interactions between cells that are physically next to one another by binding to other notch proteins. Lowered Notch1 expression resulted in no tadpole tail regeneration, and induced Notch1 expression was able to partially rescue tail regeneration in the form of the notochord and spinal cord (but very little musculature.)

Moreover, Wnt/beta-catenin activation has shown promising results in its involvement with dedifferentiation. In both a human epithelial cell transplant into mice and in vitro epithelial cell model, the activated canonical Wnt signaling pathway was found to be necessary for dedifferentiation. When in conjunction with Nanog, the canonical Wnt pathway also induced partial dedifferentiation in zebrafish endothelial cells, as seen by an increase in cell cycle re-entry and loss of cellular adhesion.

== Plasticity ==
Cell plasticity is the idea that cells can switch phenotypes in response to environmental cues. In the context of regeneration, this environmental cue is damage or injury to a limb. Cell plasticity is closely related to dedifferentiation, implying that a cell with ‘plasticity’ can dedifferentiate to change phenotypes. Cell plasticity suggests that cells can change phenotypes slightly; not fully de-differentiating, to serve a better function. A strong example of this is lens regeneration in the newt.

== Vertebrates ==
Across various vertebrate models that have been used to study cell behavior during wound healing, dedifferentiation is consistently reflected by changes in gene expression, morphology, and proliferative activity that distinguish it from its previously terminally differentiated state.

=== Zebrafish ===
Upon injury, zebrafish (Danio rerio) cardiomyocytes have been found to have the capability to differentiate and subsequently rapidly proliferate as a wound healing response. Specifically, resection of up to 20% of the zebrafish ventricle regenerates via the proliferation of already differentiated cardiomyocyte. The cardiomyocytes dedifferentiation is observed through detachment from other cells as well as changes in morphology.

=== Mice ===
In mouse myotubes, dedifferentiation was induced upon the suppression of two tumor suppressor genes, encoding the retinoblastoma protein and alternative reading frame protein. These murine primary myotube cells then exhibited a decrease in differentiated cardiomyocyte gene expression, an increase in proliferation, and a change in morphology. Moreover, mouse Schwann cells were shown to have a capability to differentiate when the Ras/Raf/ERK pathway is activated. In this study, the addition of Ras blocks Schwann cell differentiation and induces dedifferentiation. A decrease in Schwann cell gene expression marks this transition. After dedifferentiation, new cells can be generated by re-entering the cell cycle and proliferating, then redifferentiating to myelinate the mice neurons.

=== Urodeles ===
Salamanders, including newts and axolotls, are species with the most known regenerative abilities.

Adult newts can regenerate limbs, tail, upper and lower jaws, spinal cord, retinas, lenses, optic nerves, intestine, and a portion of its heart ventricle Axolotls share the same abilities, save the retina and lens. These animals are important to the study of dedifferentiation because they use dedifferentiation to create new progenitor cells. This is different from mammalian regeneration, because mammals use preexisting stem cells to replace lost tissues. Dedifferentiation in the newt occurs 4–5 days after limb amputation and is characterized by cell cycle re-entry and down-regulation of differentiation markers. cell differentiation is determined by what genes the cell expresses, and down-regulation of this expression would make for a less, or “un”, differentiated cell. Re-entry into the cell cycle allows the cell to go through mitosis, dividing to make more cells that would be able to provide new tissue. It has been observed that actinomycin D prevents dedifferentiation in newts

== Invertebrates ==
It is less common to find examples of dedifferentiation (due to a lack of regenerative ability) in most invertebrates. This brief example outlines dedifferentiation in an invertebrate species, and interestingly involves the Msx pathway, as detailed above in the mechanisms section.

=== Lancelet ===
Upon amputation, lancelet tails healed and formed a blastema structure, suggesting dedifferentiation of cells to prepare for regeneration. Lancelets can regenerate anterior and posterior structures, including neural tube, notochord, fin, and muscle The blastema that is formed expresses PAX3 and PAX7, which is associated with activation of muscle stem cells. This specific invertebrate model seems to be limited in its dedifferentiation abilities with size and age. The older and larger the animal is, the less apt it is for dedifferentiation.

== Other Terms Related to Dedifferentiation ==
=== Anaplasia ===
Anaplasia is defined as cells being in an undifferentiated state and it is often associated with cancer. Often this loss of mature cell markers or morphology can be due to dedifferentiation, but it is sometimes used to refer to cells with incomplete differentiation presenting large variety in size and shape. While its definition can be conflated with dedifferentiation, it is more often perceived as a loss of differentiation leading to abnormal cell activity, including but not limited to tumorigenesis. However, dedifferentiation is often perceived as a reversion to a different cell type for regenerative purposes. In anaplastic cells, there is often an increase in proliferation and abnormal cellular organization, characteristics that are also present in dedifferentiated cells.

=== Undifferentiation ===
Undifferentiated cells have not completed differentiation or specialization, thus retaining their cell potency and oftentimes being highly proliferative. This is often the final cell state after the dedifferentiation process is completed and maintained, as cells become less specialized.

=== Metaplasia ===
Metaplasia is not another definition of dedifferentiation, but the two words have very similar implications for cells. Metaplasia refers to the change from a fully differentiated cell type to another. This implies that the cell is able to adapt to environmental stimuli, and that it is possible to reverse embryological commitments in the form of differentiation. The idea of metaplasia depends on the ability for a cell to dedifferentiate. This definition is important to consider when discussing dedifferentiation because the two concepts overlap closely, such that metaplasia may rely on dedifferentiation, or they may share similar pathways. Metaplasia, however, aligns more closely with transdifferentiation, because metaplasia refers more to the idea of a phenotypic transition.

=== Transdifferentiation ===
Transdifferentiation refers to the conversion of one cellular phenotype to another. This phrase defines the overview of what dedifferentiation contributes to cell fates; firstly, dedifferentiation brings the cell back up the epigenetic landscape, and then the cell can “roll” down a new valley, thus re-differentiating into a new phenotype. This whole process of the cell fate changing from its original to a new fate is transdifferentiation. However, there is also a second definition of transdifferentiation, in which cells can be directly induced into a new cell type without necessitating dedifferentiation as an intermediate step.

== Current Research and Future Implications ==
Currently, studies and experiments are being done to test for dedifferentiation-like abilities in mammalian cells, with hopes that this information can provide more insight into possible regenerative abilities in mammals. Dedifferentiation could spark innovation in regenerative medicine because it suggests that one's own cells can change cell fates, which would remove immunological response risks from treatment with allogeneic cells, or cells that are not genetically matched with the patient. A concept that has been explored for mammals is that of inducible dedifferentiation, which would make cells that do not naturally dedifferentiate be able to revert to a pluripotent or progenitor-like state. This is achieved by expressing the appropriate transcription factors in the cell and suppressing others. More information about this as well as the possible risks can be found here .

== See also ==
- Dolly (sheep), a female Finn-Dorset sheep and the first mammal that was cloned from an adult somatic cell.
- Pluripotency
