= Sodium methylsulfinylmethylide =

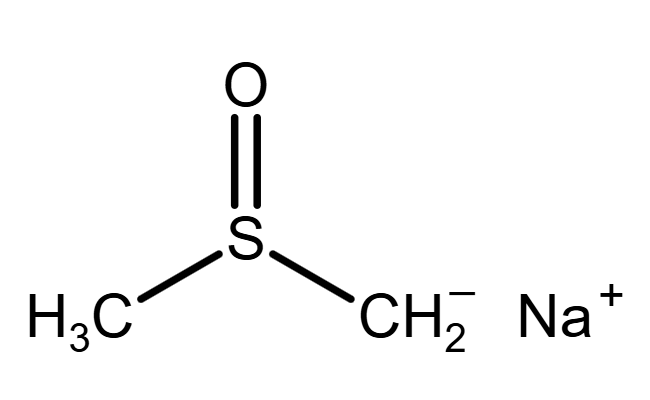

Names
- Preferred IUPAC name Sodium (methanesulfinyl)methanide
- Other names sodium dimsylate, dimsylsodium, NaDMSYL

Identifiers
CAS Number	15590-23-5
3D model (JSmol)	Interactive image
Abbreviations	NaDMSO
ChemSpider	8329518
PubChem CID	10154010
UNII	R6HI470Q52
CompTox Dashboard (EPA)	DTXSID10436194
- InChI: InChI=1S/C2H5OS.Na/c1-4(2)3;/h1H2,2H3;/q-1;+1 Key: CWXOAQXKPAENDI-UHFFFAOYSA-N; InChI=1S/C2H5OS.Na/c1-4(2)3;/h1H2,2H3;/q-1;+1 Key: CWXOAQXKPAENDI-UHFFFAOYAA; Key: CWXOAQXKPAENDI-UHFFFAOYSA-N
- SMILES: [Na+].O=S([CH2-])C

Properties
Chemical formula	CH_{3}S(O)CH_{2}Na
Molar mass	100.11 g·mol^{−1}
Appearance	White solid, solution in DMSO is green
Solubility in water	decomposes
Solubility	Very soluble in DMSO and many polar organic solvents

Hazards
- Occupational safety and health (OHS/OSH)
Main hazards	May form corrosive NaOH, May be explosive in certain circumstances.

Related compounds
Related compounds	Dimethyloxosulfonium methylide, Dimethyl sulfoxide
- Except where otherwise noted, data are given for materials in their standard state (at 25 °C [77 °F], 100 kPa). verify (what is ?) Infobox references

Sodium methylsulfinylmethylide (also called NaDMSO or dimsyl sodium) is the sodium salt of dimethyl sulfoxide. It has the chemical formula CH_{3}S(O)CH^{−}_{2}Na^{+}. This unusual salt has some uses in organic chemistry as a base and nucleophile.

First reported by Corey and Chaykovsky in 1962. and subsequent usage in organic synthesis reported in 1965 by Corey et al., a number of additional uses for this reagent have been identified.

== Preparation ==
Sodium methylsulfinylmethylide is prepared by heating sodium hydride or sodium amide in DMSO

CH_{3}S(O)CH_{3} + NaH → CH_{3}S(O)CH^{−}_{2}Na^{+} + H_{2}
CH_{3}S(O)CH_{3} + NaNH_{2} → CH_{3}S(O)CH^{−}_{2}Na^{+} + NH_{3}

== Reactions ==
=== As a base ===
The pK_{a} of DMSO is 35, which leads NaDMSO to be a powerful Brønsted base. NaDMSO is used in the generation of phosphorus and sulfur ylides. NaDMSO in DMSO is especially convenient in the generation of dimethyloxosulfonium methylide and dimethylsulfonium methylide.

=== Reaction with esters ===
NaDMSO condenses with esters (1) to form β-ketosulfoxides (2), which can be useful intermediates. Reduction of β-ketosulfoxides with aluminium amalgam gives methyl ketones (3). Reaction with alkyl halides followed by elimination gives α,β-unsaturated ketones (4). β-ketosulfoxides can also be used in the Pummerer rearrangement to introduce nucleophiles alpha to a carbonyl (5).

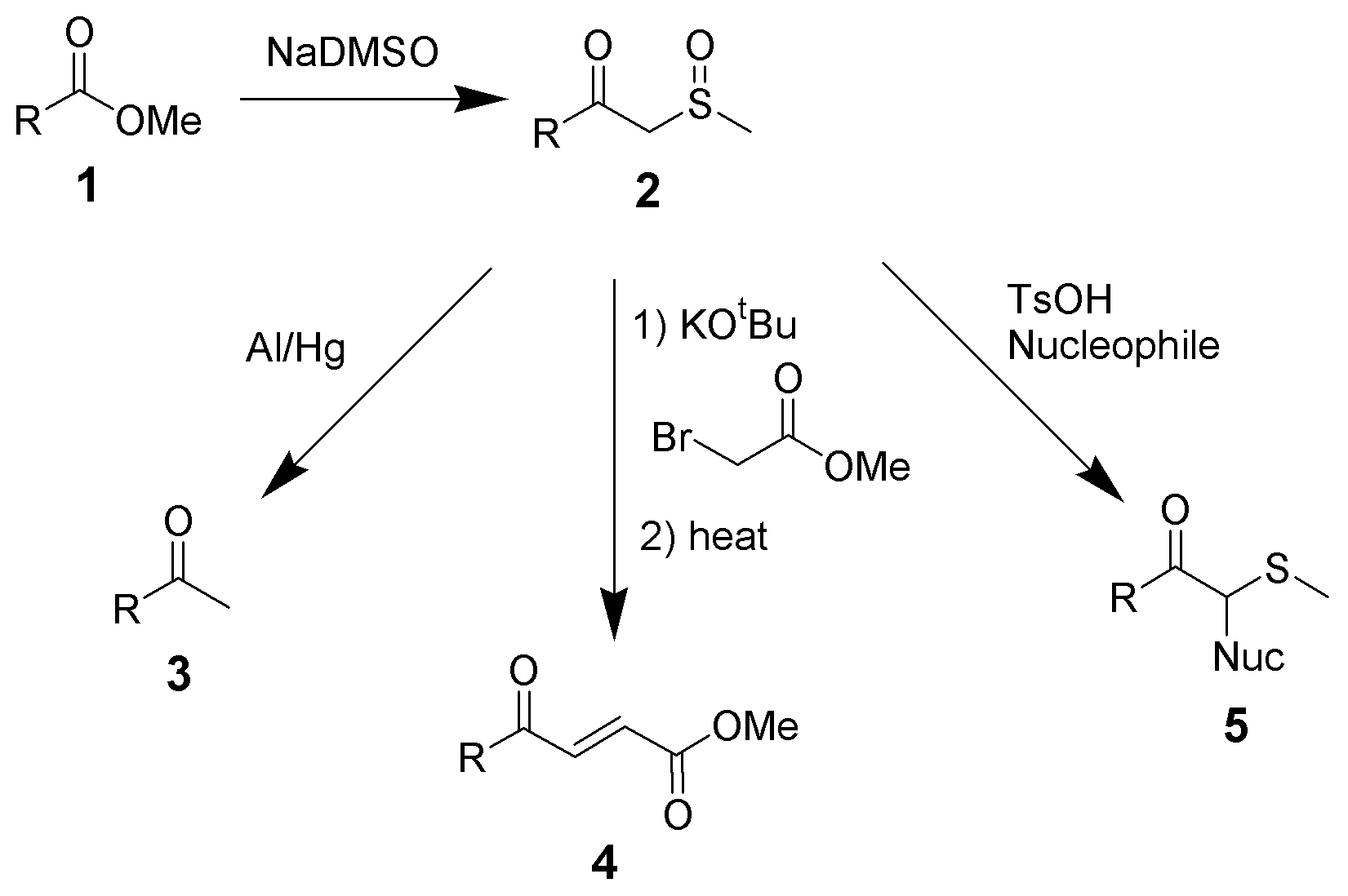

=== Methylation of sugars ===
Permethylation of sugars with dimsyl sodium was reported by Hakomori in 1964 This usage is sometimes called Hakomori methylation.
