= Diethyl sulfate =

- Diethyl sulfate

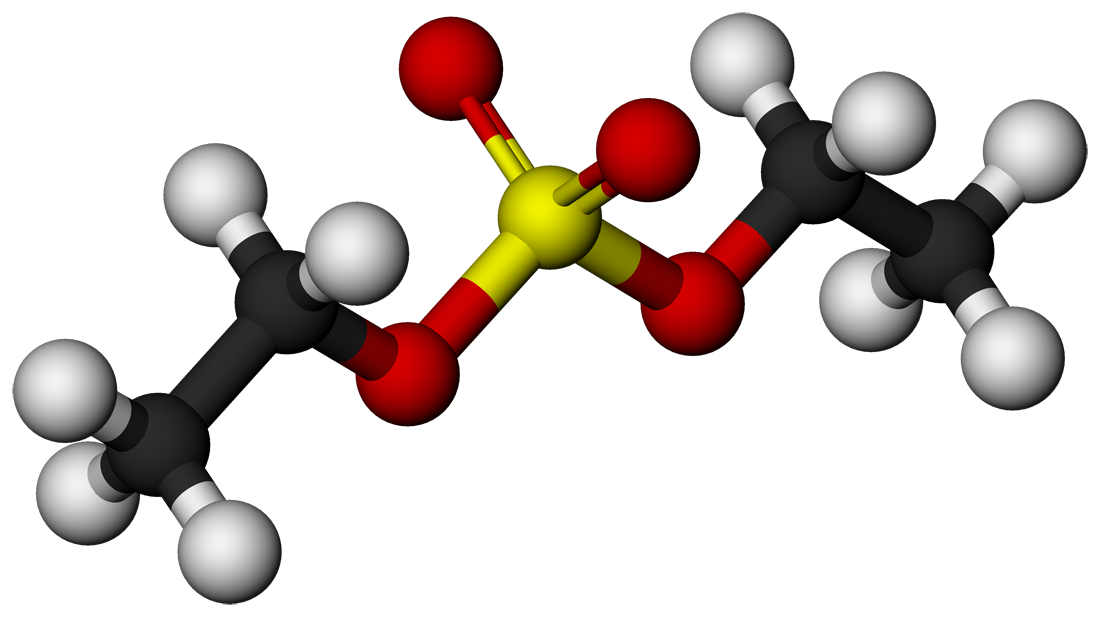

Names
- Preferred IUPAC name Diethyl sulfate
- Other names Sulfuric acid diethyl ester

Identifiers
CAS Number	64-67-5
3D model (JSmol)	Interactive image
Abbreviations	DES; Et_{2}SO_{4}
ChEBI	CHEBI:34699
ChEMBL	ChEMBL163100
ChemSpider	5931
ECHA InfoCard	100.000.536
KEGG	C14706
PubChem CID	6163
RTECS number	WS7875000
UNII	K0FO4VFA7I
CompTox Dashboard (EPA)	DTXSID1024045
- InChI: InChI=1S/C4H10O4S/c1-3-7-9(5,6)8-4-2/h3-4H2,1-2H3 Key: DENRZWYUOJLTMF-UHFFFAOYSA-N; InChI=1/C4H10O4S/c1-3-7-9(5,6)8-4-2/h3-4H2,1-2H3 Key: DENRZWYUOJLTMF-UHFFFAOYAR
- SMILES: O=S(=O)(OCC)OCC

Properties
Chemical formula	C_{4}H_{10}O_{4}S
Molar mass	154.18 g·mol^{−1}
Appearance	Colorless liquid
Density	1.2 g/mL
Melting point	−25 °C (−13 °F; 248 K)
Boiling point	209 °C (408 °F; 482 K) (decomposes)
Solubility in water	decomposes in water
Vapor pressure	0.29 mm Hg
Magnetic susceptibility (χ)	−86.8·10^{−6} cm^{3}/mol

Hazards
- GHS labelling
Pictograms	(GHS05: Corrosive) (GHS07: Exclamation mark) (GHS08: Health hazard)
Signal word	Danger
Hazard statements	H302, H312, H314, H332, H340, H350
Precautionary statements	P201, P202, P260, P264, P270, P271, P280, P281, P301+P312, P301+P330+P331, P302+P352, P303+P361+P353, P304+P312, P304+P340, P305+P351+P338, P308+P313, P310, P312, P321, P322, P330, P363, P405, P501
NFPA 704 (fire diamond)	3 1 1
Flash point	104 °C (219 °F; 377 K)

Related compounds
Related compounds	Dimethyl sulfate; diethyl sulfite
- Except where otherwise noted, data are given for materials in their standard state (at 25 °C [77 °F], 100 kPa). verify (what is ?) Infobox references

Diethyl sulfate (DES) is an organosulfur compound with the formula (C_{2}H_{5})_{2}SO_{4}. It occurs as a colorless, oily liquid with a faint peppermint odor. It is a toxic, combustible, and likely carcinogenic chemical compound. Diethyl sulfate is used as an ethylating agent.

== Structure and properties ==
Although the formula for diethyl sulfate is typically written (C_{2}H_{5})_{2}SO_{4}, a more descriptive formula would be (C_{2}H_{5}O)_{2}SO_{2}. It is a diester of sulfuric acid. Sulfur is tetrahedral.

Diethyl sulfate hydrolyzes readily, forming ethanol and ethyl sulfate. Eventually sulfuric acid is formed with excess water.

== Reactions ==
Diethyl sulfate is used to an alkylating agent to prepare ethyl ethers, ethyl amines and ammonium salts, and ethyl thioethers. In preparing ethyl esters of fatty acids, both equivalents of the ethyl electrophile are transferred, unlike the usual alkylation of phenoxides:

2 RCO_{2}Na + (C_{2}H_{5}O)_{2}SO_{2} → 2 RCO_{2}C_{2}H_{5} + Na_{2}SO_{4}

Both dimethyl sulfate and diethyl sulfate react with inorganic nucleophiles as well. For example, potassium iodide gives ethyl iodide.

== Preparation ==
Diethyl sulfate cannot be prepared efficiently analogously to the method used for dimethyl sulfate. The reaction of oleum with diethyl ether results in excessive oxidation of the ethyl groups. Instead, diethyl sulfate is prepared in two steps starting from chlorosulfuric acid:

ClSO_{3}H + C_{2}H_{5}OH → C_{2}H_{5}OSO_{3}H + HCl

The resulting ethyl sulfate is then heated with sodium sulfate, leading to a redistribution reaction:

2 C_{2}H_{5}OSO_{3}H + Na_{2}SO_{4} → (C_{2}H_{5}O)_{2}SO_{2} + 2 NaHSO_{4}

== Safety ==
Like other strong alkylating agents and especially dimethyl sulfate, diethyl sulfate is toxic and genotoxic. It is classified as a Group 2A (probably carcinogenic to humans) carcinogen by the IARC. Experimentation with animals has suggested this compound is likely carcinogenic to humans as it was implicated in the development of laryngeal cancer. Evidence of the effects of this chemical compound on reproductive or developmental health is also lacking.

=== Neutralization ===
Dialkyl sulfates can be rendered nontoxic by treatment with aqueous ammonia.
