= Pluripotency (biological compounds) =

Ability of certain substances to produce several distinct biological responses

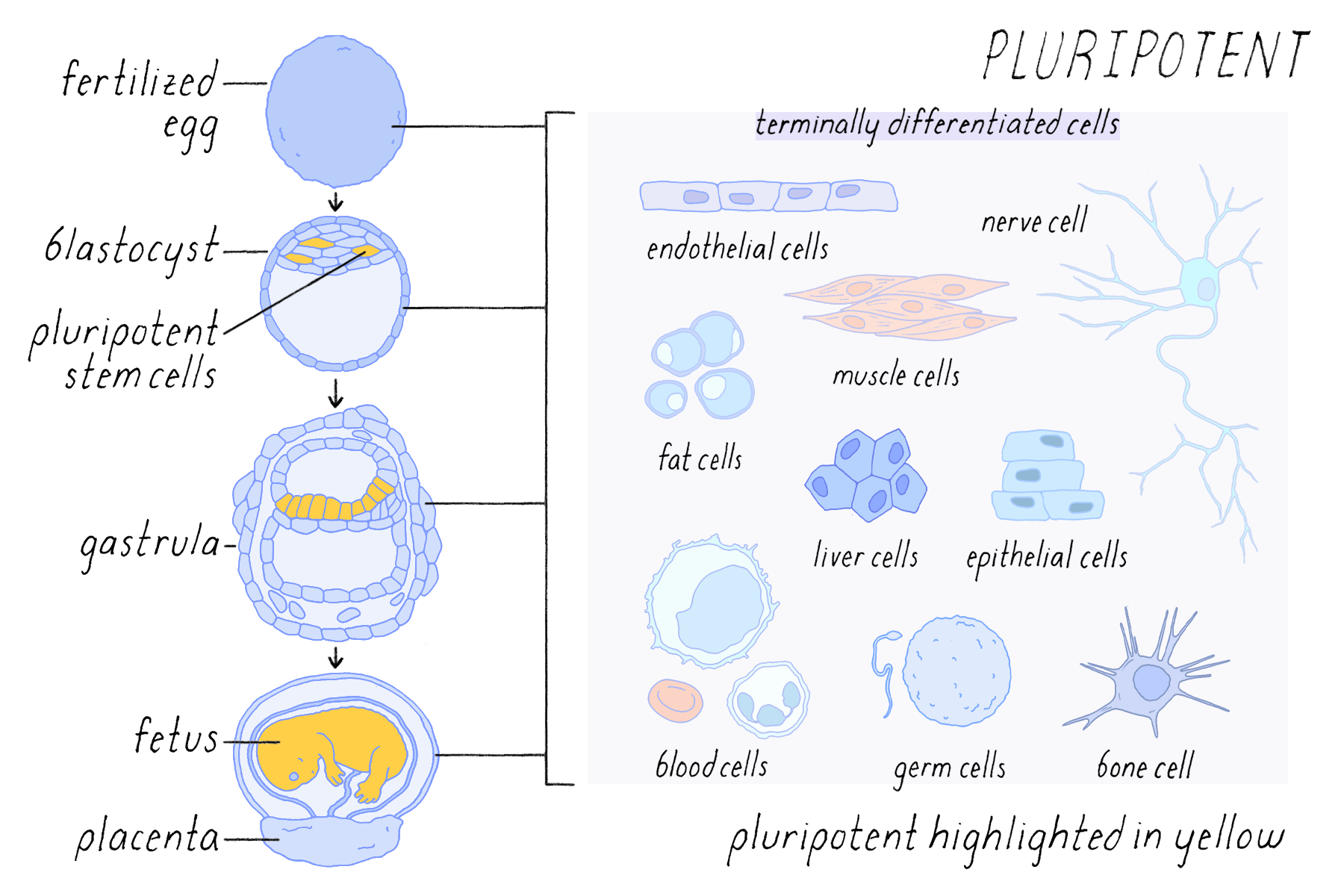
A type of stem cell that can become any type of cell in the adult body.

The pluripotency of biological compounds describes the ability of certain substances to produce several distinct biological responses. Pluripotent is also described as something that has no fixed developmental potential, as in being able to differentiate into different cell types in the case of pluripotent stem cells.

One type of pluripotent cell, called a hematopoietic stem cell, can differentiate into a large variety of cells with different functions. This stem cell can produce red blood cells, platelets, mast cells, dendritic cells, macrophages, lymphocytes, neutrophils, basophils, and eosinophils. Each of these cells have a different function, but they all work together as part of the immune system. Monocytes can differentiate into either dendritic cells or macrophages. Macrophages are covered with chemical receptors and phagocytose foreign particles, but are specific about what immune responses to be involved in. Dendritic cells phagocytose invaders; then they present the antigen on their surface to stimulate the acquired immune system (lymphocytes) as backup.

Another example are lymphocytes called naïve T-helper cells. These cells can differentiate into many subtypes once activated by antigen presenting cells (APCs) like dendrites. They divide into memory cells, TH1, TH17, and TH2 cells, to name a few. Memory cells are made solely for the purpose of having a template to use in the case of reinfection so the body has a jump start instead of starting over as if never infected. TH17 cells do a variety of tasks including recruiting neutrophils, creating defensins, and mediating inflammation in the intestinal epithelium and skin. TH2 cells produce cytokines that will trigger certain B cells. B cells can differentiate into memory cells or plasma cells. The B plasma cells produce the antibodies that are used to tag invading cells so they can be attacked, among other functions. TH1 cells are created to make cytokines, like interferon gamma, that activate macrophages and cytotoxic T lymphocytes (CTLs).

Interferon gamma represents an example of pluripotency in itself. Many cytokines are pluripotent, in that each of these compounds can activate specific behavior in some cell types and inhibit other behavior in other cell types. Once activated by T lymphocytes or Natural Killer cells, interferon gamma upregulates expression of macrophages and both types of major histocompatibility complex (MHC) antigens. In B lymphocytes (B cells), interferon gamma stimulates antibody class switching. All of these cells have different, specialized functions, but they all came from one pluripotent cell.

== See also ==
- Induced pluripotent stem cell
- Directed differentiation
- Dedifferentiation
