= Diethyl sulfoxide =

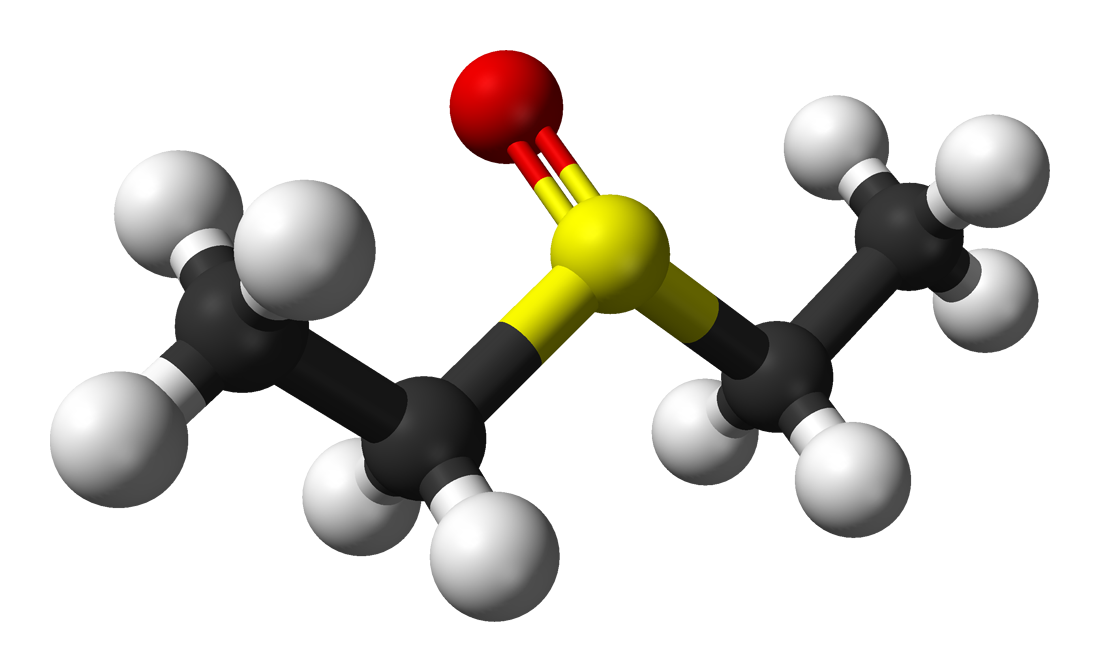

Names
- Preferred IUPAC name (Ethanesulfinyl)ethane
- Other names DESO, diethyl sulphoxide, ethyl sulfoxide, 1,1'-sulfinylbisethane

Identifiers
CAS Number	70-29-1
3D model (JSmol)	Interactive image
ChEMBL	ChEMBL174477
ChemSpider	6027
ECHA InfoCard	100.000.666
PubChem CID	6263
UNII	030Z61382M
CompTox Dashboard (EPA)	DTXSID70220253
- InChI: InChI=1S/C4H10OS/c1-3-6(5)4-2/h3-4H2,1-2H3 Key: CCAFPWNGIUBUSD-UHFFFAOYSA-N; InChI=1/C4H10OS/c1-3-6(5)4-2/h3-4H2,1-2H3 Key: CCAFPWNGIUBUSD-UHFFFAOYAI
- SMILES: O=S(CC)CC

Properties
Chemical formula	C_{4}H_{10}OS
Molar mass	106.18 g·mol^{−1}
Appearance	colorless viscous liquid
Density	1.066 g/cm^{3}
Melting point	14 °C (57 °F; 287 K)

Hazards
- Lethal dose or concentration (LD, LC)
LD_{50} (median dose)	5650 mg/kg (oral, rat)
- Except where otherwise noted, data are given for materials in their standard state (at 25 °C [77 °F], 100 kPa). verify (what is ?) Infobox references

Diethyl sulfoxide is the organosulfur compound with the formula (C_{2}H_{5})_{2}SO. It is closely related to the more common dimethyl sulfoxide.

Diethyl sulfoxide prepared by oxidation of diethyl sulfide.
