= Somatic epitype =

A somatic epitype is a non-heritable epigenetic alteration in a gene. It is similar to conventional epigenetics in that it does not involve changes in the DNA primary sequence. Physically, the somatic epitype corresponds to changes in DNA methylation, oxidative damage (replacement of GTP with oxo-8-dGTP), or changes in DNA-chromatin structure that are not reversed by normal cellular or nuclear repair mechanisms. Somatic epitypes alter gene expression levels without altering the amino acid sequence of the expressed protein. Current research suggests that somatic epitypes can be altered both before and after birth, and this alteration can be in response to exposure to heavy metals (such as lead), differences in maternal care, or nutritional or behavioral stress. There is no indication that somatic epitypes are heritable in a conventional epigenetic fashion. Some research suggests that methylation levels (and gene expression) can be reversed for some somatic epitypes by alterations in environmental factors such as diet.

== See also ==
- Epigenetics

== Sources ==
- Lahiri DK, Maloney B (2006). "Genes are not our destiny: the somatic epitype bridges between the genotype and the phenotype". Nature Reviews Neuroscience. 7 (12): 976. doi:10.1038/nrn2022-c1.
- Mathers JC (June 2006). "Nutritional modulation of ageing: genomic and epigenetic approaches". Mech. Ageing Dev. 127 (6): 584–9. doi:10.1016/j.mad.2006.01.018. PMID 16513160. S2CID 9187848.
