= Dimethyl sulfite =

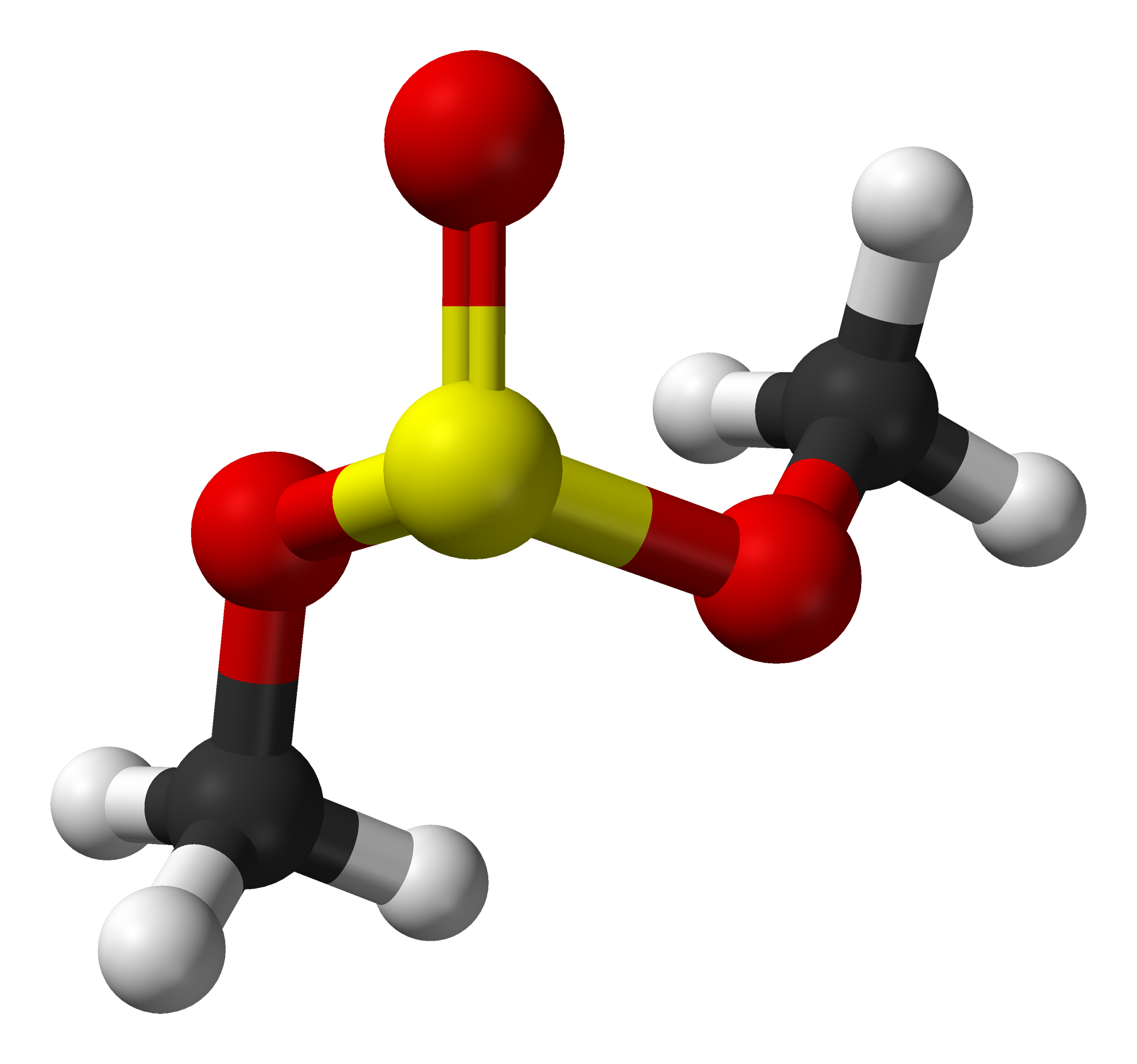

Names
- Preferred IUPAC name Dimethyl sulfite
- Other names Dimethyl sulphite Sulfurous acid, dimethyl ester DMSO_{3}

Identifiers
CAS Number	616-42-2
3D model (JSmol)	Interactive image; Interactive image
Abbreviations	DMSO_{3} Me_{2}SO3
ChEBI	CHEBI:48858
ChemSpider	62436
ECHA InfoCard	100.009.529
EC Number	210-481-0
PubChem CID	69223
UNII	9JFA40S66P
CompTox Dashboard (EPA)	DTXSID3060665
- InChI: InChI=1S/C2H6O3S/c1-4-6(3)5-2/h1-2H3 Key: BDUPRNVPXOHWIL-UHFFFAOYSA-N; InChI=1/C2H6O3S/c1-4-6(3)5-2/h1-2H3 Key: BDUPRNVPXOHWIL-UHFFFAOYAF
- SMILES: COS(=O)OC; O=S(OC)OC

Properties
Chemical formula	C_{2}H_{6}O_{3}S
Molar mass	110.13 g·mol^{−1}
Appearance	Clear liquid
Density	1.29 g/cm^{3}
Boiling point	126 °C (259 °F; 399 K)
- Except where otherwise noted, data are given for materials in their standard state (at 25 °C [77 °F], 100 kPa). verify (what is ?) Infobox references

Dimethyl sulfite is a sulfite ester with the chemical formula (CH_{3}O)_{2}SO.

Dimethyl sulfite is used as an additive in some polymers to prevent oxidation. It is also a potentially useful high energy battery electrolyte solvent.

== Structure and conformation ==
The dimethyl sulfite molecule can adopt several conformations. The most stable is the GG conformer. Each C–O bond is gauche to the S=O bond, depicted below.

== Preparation ==
Dimethyl sulfite is prepared from a 1:2 ratio of thionyl chloride and methanol. The reaction can be catalyzed by tertiary amine bases and likely proceeds via the chlorosulfinate (MeOS(O)Cl), this intermediate will exist only fleetingly in the presence of methanol and as such its decomposition to methyl chloride and sulfur dioxide (via the slower SNi mechanism) is not observed to any great extent.

SOCl_{2} + 2 CH_{3}OH → (CH_{3}O)_{2}SO + 2 HCl

== See also ==
- Methyl methanesulfonate, chemical isomer
- Diethyl sulfite, a similar sulfite ester
- Dimethyl sulfoxide
- Dimethyl sulfate, a sulfate ester
