= P19 cell =

Embryonic carcinoma cell line

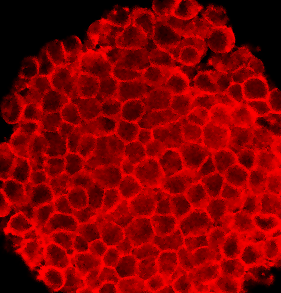
Mouse P19 embryonal carcinoma cells immunostained to show the location of beta-catenin at cell-to-cell contacts

P19 cells are an embryonic carcinoma cell line derived from an embryo-derived teratocarcinoma in mice. The cell line is pluripotent and can differentiate into cell types of all three germ layers. They can be induced into cardiac muscle cells and neuronal cells by different chemical treatments. Exposing aggregated P19 cells to dimethyl sulfoxide (DMSO) induces differentiation into cardiac and skeletal muscle. Exposing them to retinoic acid (RA) leads to neuronal cells.

== Origin of the P19 cell line ==
Cancer cells in humans may result in the patient's death if the aggressive cancer cell grows and metastasizes. However, researchers utilize these cells to study the development of cancer cells in order to find more specific treatments. For developmental biologists, embryonal carcinoma, which is derived from teratocarcinoma, is a good object for developmental study.

In 1982, McBurney and Rogers transplanted a 7.5 day mouse embryo into the testis to induce tumor growth. Cell cultures containing undifferentiated stem cells were isolated from the primary tumor which have a euploid karyotype. These stem cells were named embryonal carcinoma P19 cells. These derived P19 cells grew rapidly without feeder cells and were easy to maintain. Moreover, the multipotency of P19 cells was then confirmed by injecting the cells into blastocysts of another mouse strain. The researchers found that there were tissues from all three germ layers growing in the recipient mouse. Based on their continuous studies, they further derived subtype cell lines from original P19 cells: P19S18, P19D3, P19RAC65 and P19C16. The difference between these subtype cell lines is the ability to differentiate into neuronal cells or muscle cells in response to treatment with retinoic acid or DMSO, respectively. More recently, various studies generate cell lines that were initially derived from differentiated P19 cells. Due to the pluripotency of P19 cells, those new derived cell lines can be ectoderm, mesoderm and endoderm-like cells.

== Differentiation of P19 cells ==
P19 cells can be maintained in exponential growth because of a stable chromosomal composition. Because embryonal carcinoma can differentiate into cells of all three germ layers, P19 cells can also differentiate into those ectoderm, mesoderm and endoderm-like cells. When embryonal carcinoma cells are cultured at high density, they start to differentiate. By aggregating the cells into an embryonic body, EC cells can also process differentiation. In P19 cells, addition of non-toxic concentrations of drugs to aggregated embryoid body cells can induce differentiation of P19 cells into specific cell lines depending on the added drug. The two most common and effective drugs are retinoic acid (RA) and dimethyl sulfoxide (DMSO). Studies have shown that a certain concentration of RA can induce P19 cells to differentiate into neuronal cells, including neurons and glial cells, whereas 0.5% - 1% DMSO led P19 cells to differentiate into cardiac or skeletal muscle cells. In the RA treatment method, neurons, astroglia and fibroblasts can be identified after aggregation. Differentiated cells also have choline acetyltransferase and acetyl cholinesterase activities. When treated with DMSO, cardiac muscle cells developed after 5 days of exposure and skeletal muscle cells appeared after 8 days of exposure. Those studies showed that drug exposure causes multipotent P19 cells to differentiate into different layers of cells. Because the concentration of retinoic acid or DMSO is nontoxic to the cells, the drug-specific differentiation is due to induction of cells not selection. Mutants of P19 cells have been generated to investigate the mechanism of drug-specific differentiation. Moreover, signaling pathways related to neurogenesis and myogenesis were also investigated by studying gene expression or generating mutants of P19 cells.

== Neurogenesis in P19 cells. ==
Treatment of undifferentiated P19 cells with retinoic acid can specifically induce them into neuronal cells. Using doses between 1 μM to 3 μM of RA can generate neurons as the most abundant cell type. Neurons under this treatment reached the highest populations between six days and nine days. Several neuronal markers such as neurofilament proteins, HNK-1 antigen and tetanus toxin binding sites are expressed at highest levels during these days. After six to nine days of treatment, the relative neuronal population declines, likely because of faster proliferation of non-neuronal cells. After 10 days of exposure, astroglial cells can be detected using glial fibrillary acidic protein (GFAP), which is a specific marker of glial cells. Other than into neurons and astrocytes, P19 cells can also differentiate to oligodendrocytes, which can be detected using the specific markers, myelin-associated glycoprotein and 2',3'-Cyclic-nucleotide 3'-phosphodiesterase. Moreover, oligodendrocytes also developed and migrated into fiber bundles in mice when the RA-induced cells were transplanted into the brains.
Retinoic acid can induce not only P19 cells but also other progenitor cells or embryonic stem cells to differentiation. Since cells after retinoic acid treatment did not immediately express neuronal marker genes, RA must initiate some pathway to process cellular differentiation. Many studies used P19 cells to investigate the RA-induced mechanisms, including generating the mutant allele of retinoic acid receptor genes and studying the expression of receptor genes, Hox genes and retinol binding proteins while exposing to RA.

All of these studies indicate that the P19 cell is a good in vitro model system for investigating the mechanism of drugs that interfere with specific cellular pathway. Furthermore, by using the ability of RA-induced neurogenesis in P19 cell, many researchers started to identify the in vitro differentiation mechanisms of neuro- or gliogenesis. Several related pathways or including Wnt/β-catenin pathway, Notch pathway and hedgehog pathway are investigated either using gene expression or generating alleles for related genes.

== Myogenesis in the P19 cell line ==
Same as retinoic acid, DMSO induced differentiation is not specific to P19 cells. It could also induce neuroblastoma cells, lung cancer cells and mouse ES cells. At concentration of 0.5–1% DMSO induced P19 cells to aggregate and process mesodermal and endodermal cell types.
The cellular mechanism that occurs during aggregation and differentiation is still not fully studied. However, some studies showed that the cellular communication plays an important role in muscle differentiation in P19 cells which might explain why cells need to aggregate first to process the muscle differentiation.
In order to elucidate the mechanism of myogenesis in P19 cells, several cardiac specific transcription factors including GATA-4, MEF2c, Msx-1, Nkx2.5, MHox, Msx-2 and MLP are found to change during differentiation. Reports have shown that GATA-4, NKx2.5 and MEF2c were all upregulated after DMSO induction. In recent years, P19 cells were also used in studying the mechanism of cardiac differentiation and myogenesis. The main affected signaling pathway, bone morphogenetic proteins (BMPs) pathway is the most strongly studied signaling in P19 cells. By generating the P19CL6noggin cell line, which overexpresses the BMP antagonist noggin, they found that the mutant cells didn't differentiate into cardiomyocytes when treated with 1% of DMSO, suggesting that the BMPs were indispensable for cardiomyocyte differentiation in this system. They also provided the evidence showing that TAK1, Nkx-2.5, and GATA-4 are important in cardiogenic BMP signaling pathway.

== Future directions ==
P19 cells provide valuable formation of both neuronal cells and muscle cells in vitro. Since P19 cells are easy to maintain and culture compared to other embryonic stem cells, they are a convenient model to perform developmental studies in vitro. Techniques to manipulate this cell line to express or knock out certain genes allow for detailed investigation of signaling pathways, functional aspects and the regulation of protein expression of myogenesis and neurogenesis. The extended research can also elucidate the later stages of heart or brain development and maturation.
