= Methyl methanesulfonate =

Carcinogenic alkylating agent used in cancer treatment

- Skeletal formula

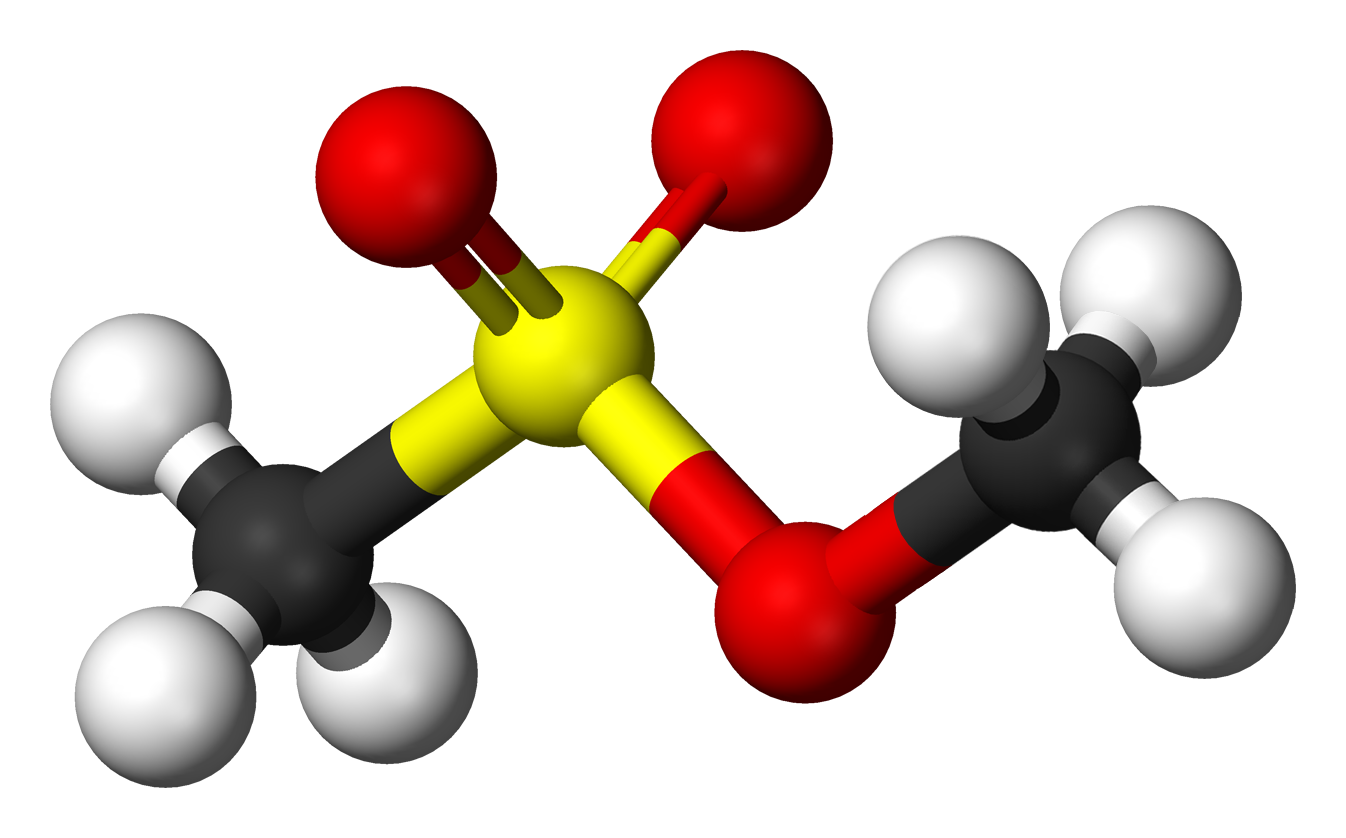
- Ball-and-stick model

Names
- Preferred IUPAC name Methyl methanesulfonate
- Other names: Methanesulfonic acid methyl ester; Methyl mesylate; MMS

Identifiers
CAS Number	66-27-3
3D model (JSmol)	Interactive image
ChEBI	CHEBI:25255
ChemSpider	4013
ECHA InfoCard	100.000.568
EC Number	200-625-0
KEGG	C19181
MeSH	D008741
PubChem CID	4156
UNII	AT5C31J09G
CompTox Dashboard (EPA)	DTXSID7020845
- InChI: InChI=1S/C2H6O3S/c1-5-6(2,3)4/h1-2H3 Key: MBABOKRGFJTBAE-UHFFFAOYSA-N; InChI=1/C2H6O3S/c1-5-6(2,3)4/h1-2H3 Key: MBABOKRGFJTBAE-UHFFFAOYAK
- SMILES: COS(=O)(=O)C

Properties
Chemical formula	CH_{3}SO_{2}OCH_{3}
Molar mass	110.13 g·mol^{−1}
Appearance	Colorless liquid
Density	1.3 g/mL at 25 °C
Boiling point	202 to 203 °C (396 to 397 °F; 475 to 476 K)

Related compounds
Related compounds	Ethyl methanesulfonate; Dimethyl sulfone; Dimethyl sulfate; S-Methyl methanethiosulfonate
- Except where otherwise noted, data are given for materials in their standard state (at 25 °C [77 °F], 100 kPa). verify (what is ?) Infobox references

Methyl methanesulfonate (MMS), also known as methyl mesylate, is an alkylating agent and a carcinogen. It is also a suspected reproductive toxicant, and may also be a skin/sense organ toxicant. It is used in cancer treatment. Its chemical formula is CH_{3}−SO_{2}−O−CH_{3}. It is a colorless liquid.

== Chemical reactions with DNA ==
MMS methylates DNA predominantly on N7-deoxyguanosine and N3-deoxyadenosine, and to a much lesser extent also methylates at other oxygen and nitrogen atoms in DNA bases, and also methylates one of the non-carbon bound oxygen atoms of the phosphodiester linkage. Originally, this action was believed to directly cause double-stranded DNA breaks, because homologous recombination-deficient cells are particularly vulnerable to the effects of MMS. However, it is now believed that MMS stalls replication forks, and cells that are homologous recombination-deficient have difficulty repairing the damaged replication forks.

== See also ==
- Dimethyl sulfite, a chemical with the same molecular formula but different arrangement
