= 2018 Australian strawberry contamination =

Food tampering event in Australia

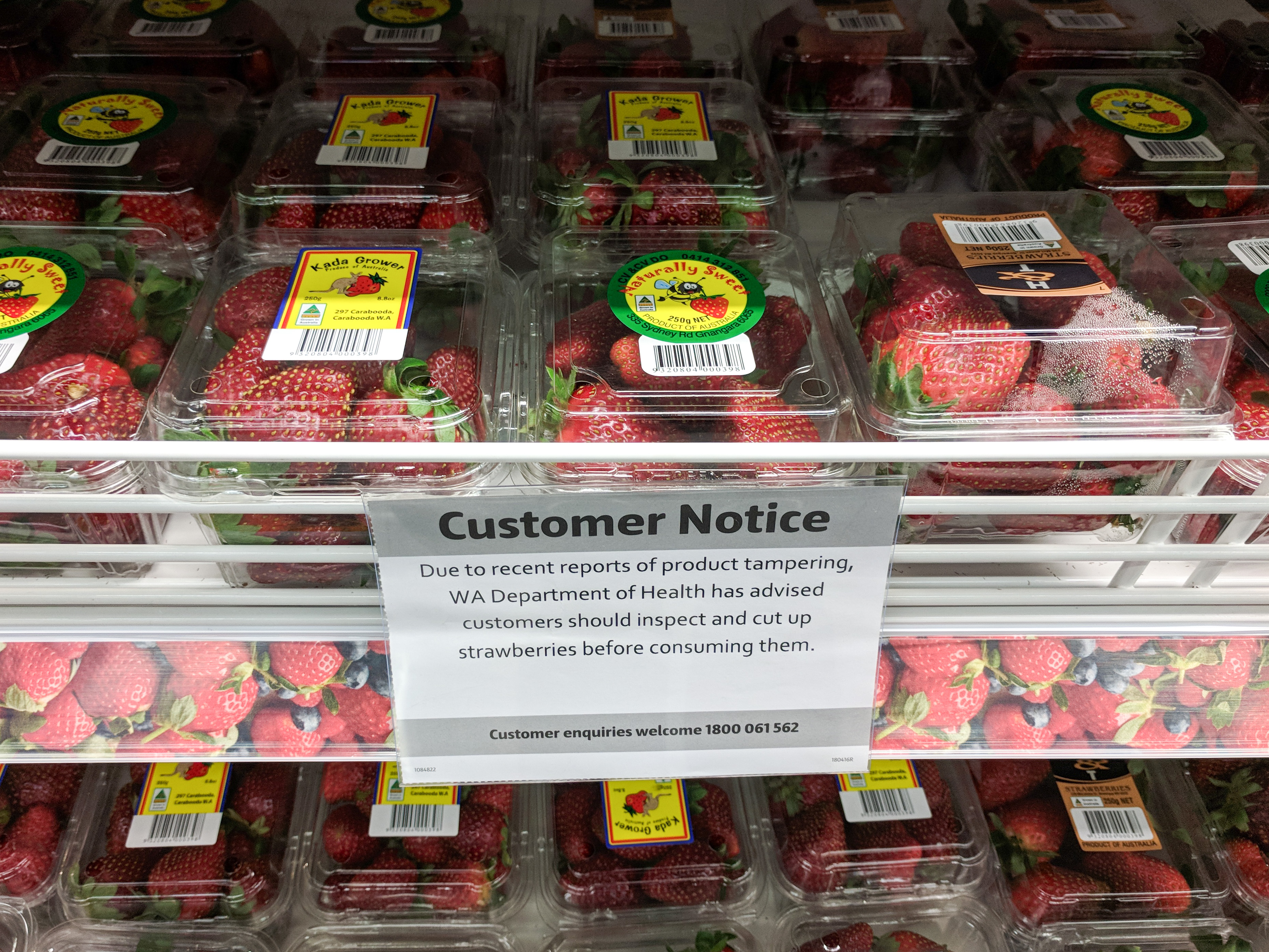
Strawberries on sale in Coles with a notice advising customers to inspect and cut up strawberries before consuming them

In a food safety crisis beginning in September 2018, numerous punnets of strawberries grown in Queensland and Western Australia were found to be contaminated with sewing needles. Queensland Police reported that by November 2018, there had been 186 reports of contamination nationally.

== Contamination ==
On 9 September 2018, several days prior to any official announcement of contamination, a Facebook user posted a warning about Berry Obsession strawberries purchased from Woolworths Strathpine Centre in Moreton Bay, north of Brisbane. The user reported that his friend had swallowed part of a needle and was in the emergency department at hospital. A second victim had called Woolworths on 11 September. The affected strawberries were not withdrawn and the contamination was not publicly reported until 12 September. In the following days, dozens of contaminated punnets of strawberries grown in Queensland and Western Australia were discovered in NSW, South Australia, Victoria and Tasmania.

Some cases are believed to be hoaxes. A South Australian man was arrested on 21 September after faking a contamination, and faced court in November 2018.

== Affected brands ==
By 16 September 2018, the following brands had been identified by authorities as being involved in the contamination:

Strawberries grown in Queensland:

- Donnybrook Berries
- Love Berry
- Delightful Strawberries
- Oasis brands
- Berry Obsession
- Berry Licious

Strawberries grown in Western Australia:

- Mal's Black Label
- Australian Choice

Police and state health authorities recommended consumers either dispose of affected brands or return them to the place of purchase. They also recommended that consumers cut up other brands before eating. Queensland chief health officer Jeannette Young stated that "If they do have any strawberries it would be safest to dispose of them."

Both Coles and Aldi Süd removed all strawberries from their shelves, but planned to restock after 18 September. Woolworths had only removed the affected brands. Woolworths later removed sewing needles from sale as a temporary measure. On 23 September, needles were found in "Australian Choice" brand strawberries sold in Auckland, New Zealand.

== Response ==
=== Investigation ===
The Queensland Strawberry Growers Association initially stated they had "reason to suspect" a "disgruntled" former packing employee was responsible for the contamination. Queensland Police Acting Chief Superintendent Terry Lawrence subsequently cast doubt upon that theory, stating "This was an earlier comment by the Strawberry Growers Association, it's something we don't subscribe to". Adrian Schultz, the vice-president of the Queensland Strawberry Growers Association described the contamination as an act of "commercial terrorism". Tony Holl, a strawberry grower from Western Australia told the ABC that he believed someone had a "vendetta" against the strawberry industry, suggesting otherwise the contamination could be a "terrorist act".

The ABC reported on Thursday that "Police believe they have contained the threat and assured consumers would be able to safely buy strawberries again from Thursday, when stock is replaced."

As of 19 September, Queensland Police had more than 100 officers, including 60 detectives, working on the investigation into the contamination. However, by 15 October Queensland Police scaled this back to one full-time detective amid a lack of clear leads.

=== Government response ===
On 15 September 2018, Queensland Premier Annastacia Palaszczuk announced a $100,000 reward for information leading to the arrest and conviction of anyone responsible for the sabotage. On 18 September, Palaszczuk announced a $1 million assistance package for the strawberry industry in the state, telling State Parliament that "This past week, Queensland has been the victim of an ugly, calculated and despicable crime." Also on 18 September, Premier of Western Australia Mark McGowan announced a $100,000 reward for information leading to a prosecution.

The two largest food retailers in New Zealand, Woolworths and Foodstuffs announced they would be removing Australian-grown strawberries from their shelves.

On 18 September 2018, Senator Bridget McKenzie, the Minister for Regional Services, issued a media statement, describing the contamination as "deliberate sabotage" and urging consumers to "exercise caution and cut up their fruit before consumption."

==== Criticism of response ====
As of 17 September 2018, a consumer-level food recall of any affected brands had yet to be issued. Instead, only a "trade recall" had been issued. Food Standards Australia New Zealand describes a trade recall as a recall "conducted when the food has not been sold directly to consumers. It involves recovery of the product from distribution centres and wholesalers". Professor Melissa Fitzgerald, a food safety expert at the University of Queensland, told the ABC she was "surprised" there had not been a consumer-level recall given the products had been sold to individual customers. The recall was not mentioned on supermarket or government food safety websites—something Professor Fitzgerald would have expected. Professor Fitzgerald said "I would expect people to go to the websites for information...People may be quite surprised not to find any information on the websites where they normally would." Professor Fitzgerald criticised the delay between the first incident on 9 September and the public warning on 12 September.

Queensland Strawberry Industry Development Officer Jennifer Rowling accused "some authoritative spokespeople" of mishandling the response to the incident. She also criticised a "sometimes hysterical media" and accused them of costing agricultural businesses millions of dollars. Rowling insisted only three brands had been affected and said "All other reported cases have either been copycats or unsubstantiated claims."

=== Grower measures and responses ===
On 15 September, Suncoast Harvest farm of the Sunshine Coast announced on Facebook that they were ceasing growing strawberries for the remainder of the year, resulting in job losses for 100 workers. Some growers started ordering and installing metal detectors to protect their strawberries from contamination.

Some farms had to dispose of strawberries in response to the crisis. Donnybrook Berries of Queensland, one of the brands affected, dumped truckloads of berries, sharing the resulting video footage which went viral with over a million views in a day. One Queensland farm burned off 500,000 strawberry plants deemed unsellable, as it was cheaper than harvesting.

=== Arrest ===
On 11 November 2018, My Ut Trinh, a 50-year-old farm supervisor, from Caboolture, was arrested in Brisbane and charged with seven counts of contaminating goods, relating to one of the initial cases of contamination involving the Berry Licious brand. Ms Trinh worked at the Berrylicious/Berry Obsession fruit farm north of Brisbane as a picking supervisor.

Shortly before the trial on 14 July 2021, charges against My Ut Trinh were dropped, as the prosecution deemed a conviction unlikely.

== Related incidents ==
On 17 September 2018, a 62-year-old woman suffering from a mental illness was cautioned after she allegedly contaminated a banana with a metal object at a supermarket in Maryborough, Queensland. Queensland Police stated the incident was not linked to the contamination crisis.

On 18 September, New South Wales Police announced needles had been discovered in bananas and apples in two separate incidents in the Sydney area. Detective Superintendent Daniel Doherty reminded the public of the importance to report incidents of contamination and "to be vigilant and exercise caution when buying strawberries and other fruit in NSW." Doherty confirmed police were investigating "more than 20 incidents in New South Wales, but nationally, the number is much higher." The apple was part of a pack of six, purchased from a Woolworths at The Ponds.

On 20 September, New South Wales Police reported that a young boy had been arrested after admitting to hiding sewing needles in strawberries as part of what police consider to be "a prank". The current penalty in New South Wales for the deliberate contamination of food is up to 10 years in jail; however, Australia's Prime Minister, Scott Morrison, had stated that "the government plans to increase the maximum jail term to 15 years.

On 20 September, a customer in West Gosford on the New South Wales Central Coast discovered a needle inside a mango.

In the wake of the needle crisis, Foodstuffs NZ made the decision to halt the distribution of Australian strawberries in all their New Zealand stores including New World, Pak'nSave, and Four Square. Countdown said that strawberries grown in New Zealand had not been affected, but it was in contact with New Zealand and Australian authorities.

== See also ==
- Food safety in Australia
