= Food Act =

Food Act may refer to:

- Food Act 1981, New Zealand
- Food Act 2006, Sweden
- Food Act 2014, New Zealand
