= Food Safety Authority =

Food Safety Authority may refer to:

- European Food Safety Authority
- New Zealand Food Safety Authority
- Norwegian Food Safety Authority
- Food Safety Authority of Ireland
- Food Safety and Standards Authority of India

== See also ==
- Food safety
- Food Standards Agency, UK
