= Food safety in New Zealand =

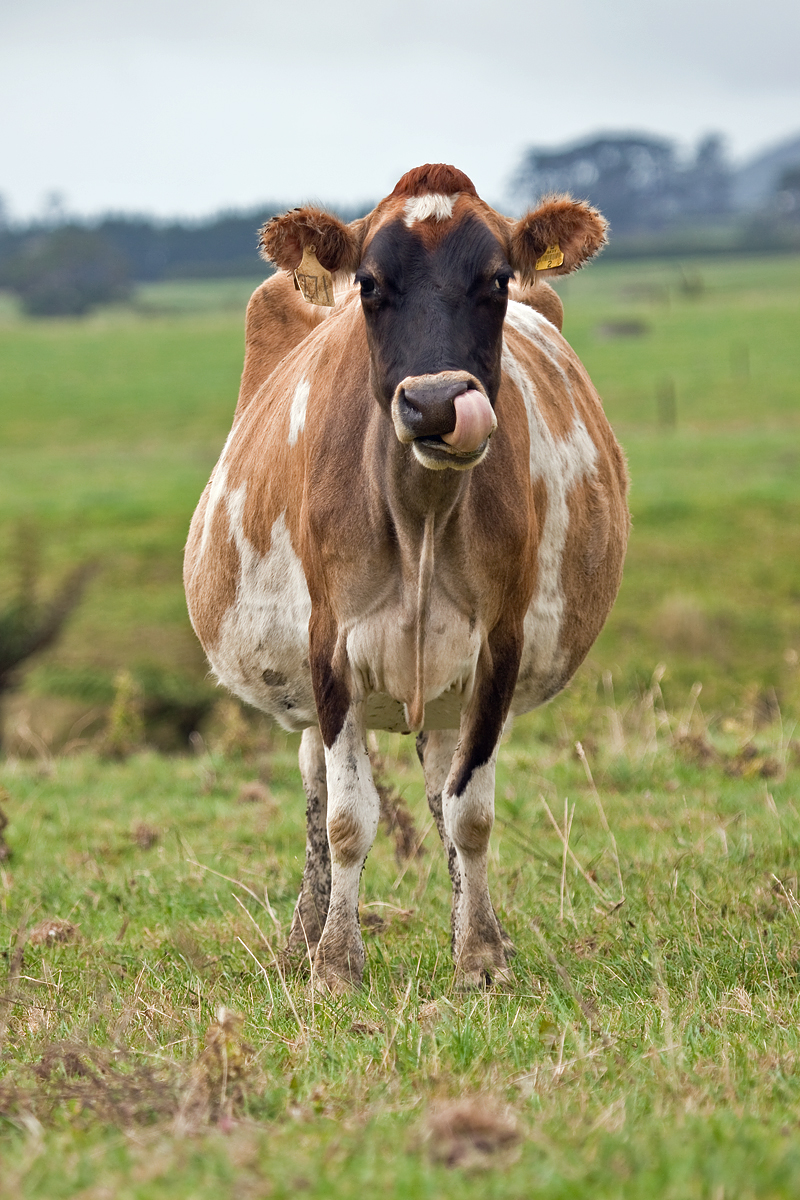
The dairy industry in New Zealand is a major sector of the economy. A "clean green" image cultivated by various sources gives foreign markets the perception of a high degree of food safety for New Zealand produce.

Food safety in New Zealand is a concern by the general public and the government takes measures to regulate it. The estimated cost to the country in 2009 of the six foodborne illnesses campylobacteriosis, salmonellosis, norovirus, yersiniosis, STEC and listeriosis was NZ$161 million.

The government launched an annual Foodsafe Week in 2007 to highlight food safety issues.

== Policy ==
The Food Act 2014, the primary legislation for governing food safety in New Zealand, is administered by the Ministry for Primary Industries, an amalgamation of the Ministry of Agriculture and Forestry, the Ministry of Fisheries, and the New Zealand Food Safety Authority (now all defunct). This act superseded the Food Act 1981 and made some fundamental changes to New Zealand's domestic food-regulatory regime. The new act was primarily intended to drive an export-led economic recovery for New Zealand, because the domestic food-regulatory regime is the platform for exports.

Food Standards Australia New Zealand (FSANZ) develops food standards after consulting with other government agencies and stakeholders.

Dr Ayesha Verrall became the Minister of Food Safety in November 2020, succeeding Damien O'Connor.

== Incidents ==
Major food safety incidents are rare but New Zealand was implicated in the 2008 Chinese milk scandal. Fonterra, New Zealand's largest dairy company, had a 43% stake in one of the affected companies. In another recent incident Fonterra found traces of DCD (2-Cyanoguanidine) in milk supplies. The levels were very low and attempts were made to prevent the test results from being reported in the media.

== Genetic engineering ==
The safety of genetically modified foods and ingredients has often been questioned, particularly since the wide-scale discussion and protests in the early 2000s.

== Pesticide residue ==
Pesticide residues are generally low and are thought to pose no detectable threat to health. The Soil & Health Association of New Zealand and the Pesticide Action Network Aotearoa New Zealand claim that the 2010 results for pesticide residue are the worst ever.

== See also ==
- Health care in New Zealand
- Agriculture in New Zealand
