= Te Uru Rākau =

New Zealand government institution managing state owned forests

New Zealand Forest Service
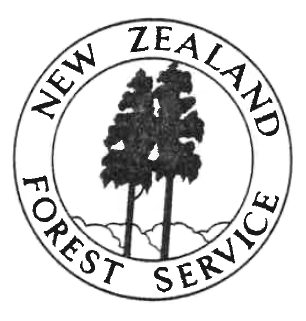

Agency overview
- Formed: 1919 (originally); 2018 (re-established)
- Dissolved: 1987 (original incarnation)
- Jurisdiction: New Zealand
- Minister responsible: Minister of Forests
- Parent department: Ministry for Primary Industries (2018–)

Te Uru Rākau – New Zealand Forest Service is the agency within the Ministry for Primary Industries that is responsible for the New Zealand forestry sector. It is headquartered in Rotorua.

It was re-established in 2018 after previously existing from 1919 to 1987.

== History ==
The New Zealand Forest Service was originally established in 1919 as the State Forest Service. The State Forest Service changed its name to the New Zealand Forest Service in 1949, at about the same time that the Forests Act of 1949 passed through Parliament.

The New Zealand Forest Service was responsible for the management of New Zealand's state-owned forests, including forestry, conservation and recreational functions, and was abolished in 1987. The Ministry of Forestry was the government agency responsible for forestry policy until its merger with the Ministry of Agriculture (into the Ministry of Agriculture and Forestry) in 1998. That ministry became part of the Ministry for Primary Industries (MPI) in 2012.

Te Uru Rākau – New Zealand Forest Service was established as a business unit within MPI in May 2018.

== Abolition ==
The New Zealand Forest Service was abolished in 1987.

- Its environmental and conservation functions were taken over by the newly established Department of Conservation.
- The logging operation and associated land was passed into the Forestry Corporation of New Zealand.
- The policy advice, biosecurity functions and remaining Crown forests on leased Māori land passed to the Ministry of Agriculture, later merged into the Ministry for Primary Industries.
- The logging operations and some land was sold, or leased to private logging companies in what were described as Crown Forest licences, under the management of Land Information New Zealand (LINZ).
- The New Zealand Forest Research Institute remained as a new state-owned institute, later re-branded as Scion (Crown Research Institute)

Special Areas Responsibility for the Crown's production forests on the West Coast operation passed onto Timberlands West Coast Limited in 1990.

=== Crown Forests ===
In 1987, the New Zealand Forest Service was disbanded and the New Zealand Government began selling Forest assets. The majority of forests were sold between 1990 and 1992, with the SOE Forestry Corporation of New Zealand sold in 1996.

In order to offset against future Waitangi Tribunal Claims the Crown (public/government) retained ownership of the land, and sold a licence to fell the trees to a commercially operated forestry company. These forestry companies operated under what is known as Crown Forest Licences. The Crown Forestry Rental Trust works to expedite the settlement of Māori claims against the Crown, which involve or could involve Crown forest licensed lands.

=== Recreation provisions in Crown Forest Licences ===
Crown licensed forests contain limited recreational access, to reflect the historic public access in New Zealand forests and the continued Crown ownership. It is a commonly held belief in New Zealand that all Crown Forests are open to the public for any recreation. The Crown Forest Licences usually only provide for public access for walkers.

Recreational access may be provided for through Section 7, Public Access Easements or Appendices which set out "Continuing Recreational Use" for organisations (clubs) within the control of the Licensee (and with the ability for the licensee to charge for use). In practice, the licensed tree harvesting companies frequently breach these contracts, and LINZ does little or nothing to enforce the licence conditions on behalf of the public, nor rectify these breaches.

Anyone can obtain a copy of a Crown Forest Licence from LINZ. On each licence, Section 6 sets out the conditions for Public Entry.

=== Waiuku Forest ===
In 1966, the Crown entered into a 100-year mining licence with New Zealand Steel to extract iron sand. Trees are cleared before mining can start so a large area of the forest is not planted and is unavailable for public access. Once mining is complete over an area, mine tailings are re-spread and the area replanted. One of the last remaining Crown Forests, Waiuku offers a wide range of free recreational opportunities to the Auckland, and Waikato communities.

== Relaunch ==
The New Zealand Forest Service was relaunched by the Labour–NZ First Coalition Government as Te Uru Rākau on 11 May 2018.
