= Food safety in Australia =

Food safety in Australia concerns the production, distribution, preparation, and storage of food in Australia to prevent foodborne illness, also known as food safety. Food Standards Australia New Zealand is responsible for developing food standards for Australia and New Zealand.

In recent years the quality and integrity of the food supply in Australia has been under observation. Incidents such as the contaminated frozen berries during the second half of 2014 and the rockmelon listeriosis outbreak in early 2018 saw a concern in particular for the health of mothers and the elderly due to the contaminants reportedly capable of causing listeria and cholera. It was reported in 2013 that, in comparison with other developed countries, Australia has higher rates for many illnesses due to foodborne pathogens. This may be caused by greater identification of cases, higher rates of detection and increased risk factors.

Australia has followed the international trend away from government oversight towards a focus on preventive measures taken by the food industry.

== History ==
The first law regulating food in Australia was the Victorian Public Food Act 1854. It was enacted in response to concerns with adulterated foods and allowed the Board of Health to inspect, seize and destroy unwholesome foods.

After federation the states retained control of food safety. These initially covered the manufacture and sale of food. Powers were expanded to include labelling requirements. A lack of uniformity amongst the various state laws hampered interstate trade and led to a series of conferences held between 1910 and 1927. In 1936, the National Health and Medical Research Council (NHMRC) was established within the Department of Health to advise on matters of public health, which included food. It wasn't until 1952 that the NHMRC pressed for national uniformity of food and drug regulations. Eventually the Food Standards Committee was created to recommend food standards for states to adopt. The first major issue was chemical additives, followed by microbiological standards. In 1989, the responsibility for food standards was transferred to the Bureau of Consumer Affairs within the Attorney-General's Department.

== Standards ==
Australia and New Zealand have a joint standards body for food safety: Food Standards Australia New Zealand (FSANZ). It is an independent statutory agency established by the Food Standards Australia New Zealand Act 1991. FSANZ is part of the Australian federal Department of Health, Disability and Ageing's portfolio.

FSANZ develops standards that regulate the use of ingredients, processing aids, colourings, additives, vitamins and minerals. Their standards also includes the composition of some foods, e.g. dairy, meat and beverages as well as standards developed by new technologies such as genetically modified foods. FSANZ is also responsible for some labelling requirements for packaged and unpackaged food, e.g. specific mandatory warnings or advisory labels. FSANZ must ensure that labelling of packaged foods includes: name and description of the product, mandatory warning and advisory statements, ingredient list, date marking, nutrition information panel, percentage labelling, directions for storage and use. Another main role of FSANZ is to manage food recall systems. When a product is declared to have safety issues like harmful bacteria or the presence of allergens the products needs to be removed from retail shelves and people's homes to ensure the health and safety of consumers.

== Governance ==
The Minister for Agriculture, Fisheries and Forestry and the Department of Agriculture, Fisheries and Forestry are responsible for food safety in Australia. They work with industry and other Australian government agencies, in particular the Department of Health, Disability and Ageing and FSANZ, to develop policy and food standards. The Australia and New Zealand food regulatory system involves the governments of Australia, New Zealand, and the governments of the Australian states and territories. Food standards are developed under the Australia New Zealand Food Standards Code, administered by FSANZ and enforced by state and territory governments.

A relevant agency in each state and territory monitors compliance with the code, while the Department of Agriculture, Fisheries and Forestry is responsible for the inspection and sampling of imported food. The Department administers relevant legislation at the Australian border, and imported food must meet Australia's biosecurity requirements under the Biosecurity Act 2015, as well as food safety requirements of the Imported Food Control Act 1992. Labelling on imported food must comply the requirements, and is regulated under the Imported Food Inspection Scheme.

== Raw milk ==
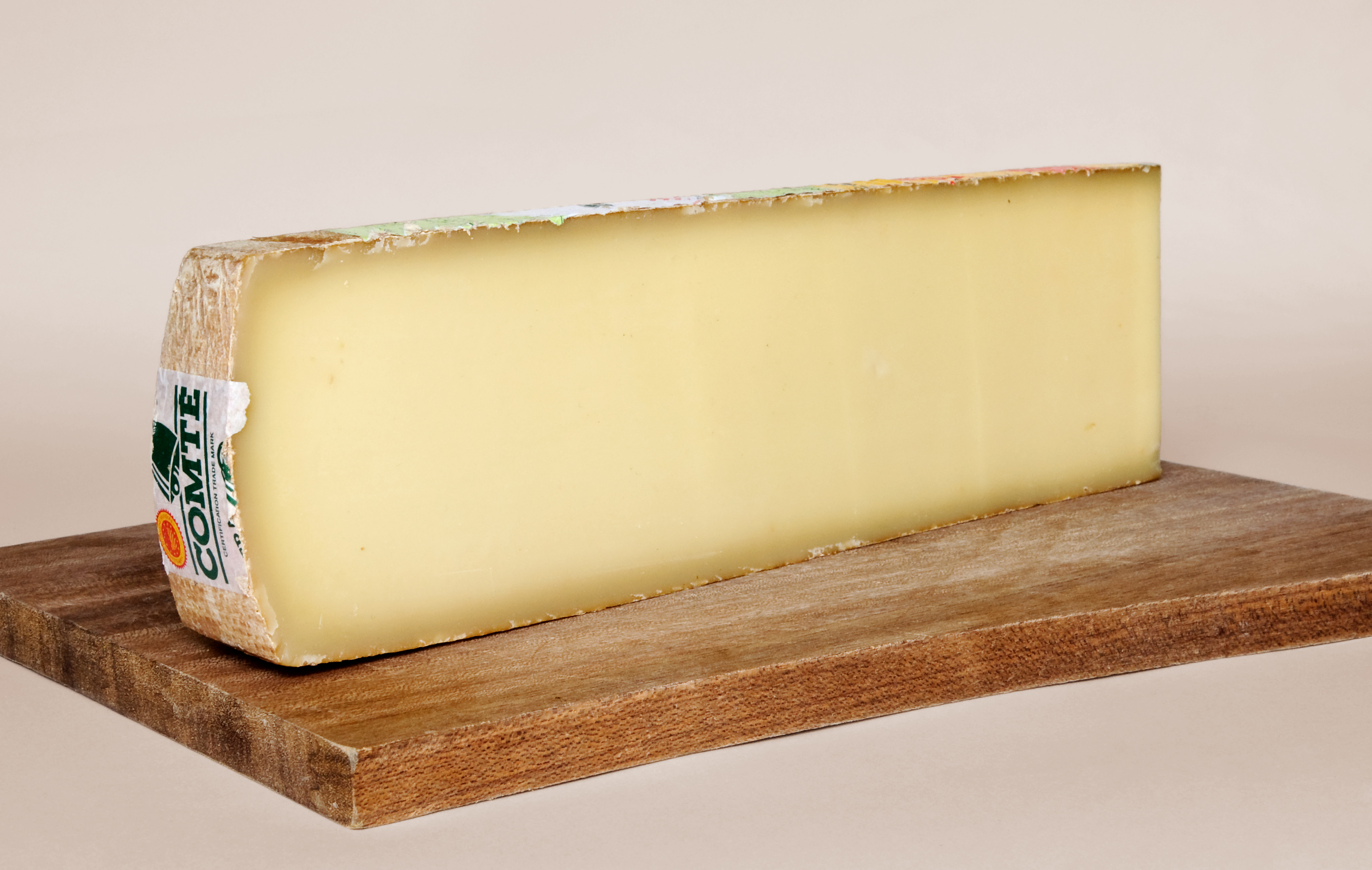
Raw milk cheese cannot be manufactured in Australia.

Raw milk (i.e. unpasteurised milk) can be sold in Australia but must be labelled as "not for human consumption". It is often sold as "bath milk" for bathing. Raw milk contains such bacteria as salmonella, E. coli and listeria, which are the cause of many foodborne illnesses. However this product is consumed by people who have a desire to drink raw milk, usually because they perceive it to a more natural less processed food.

== Domestic food safety ==
It is important to consider the spread of disease via the mishandling of food in homes, as experts agree this is a last line of defence against diseases that are food-borne. Research conducted using families in Australia has highlighted the lack of distributed knowledge in regards to food handling both domestically and generally in the community, as seen by a relatively poor knowledge of this subject. The questioning of 524 families showed that 70% poorly handled cooked food products, 42% poorly handled raw foods and 47% of families did not appropriately wash their hands to maintain hygiene while preparing food. Further research of food stage practices showed that 81% of families placed food in refrigerators inappropriately and unsafe thawing of chicken was carried out by 76% of families. These statistics raised the issue of unsafe handling of food and the need for families to be reminded of the detrimental health risks caused by the mishandling of food products in order to initiate change.

== Incidents ==
Mandatory reporting requirements exist in Australia for food disease outbreaks. The Office of Health Protection within the Department of Health, Disability and Ageing manages the OzFoodNet program, which employs epidemiologists around the country who investigate foodborne disease and develop appropriate responses to cases.

1995

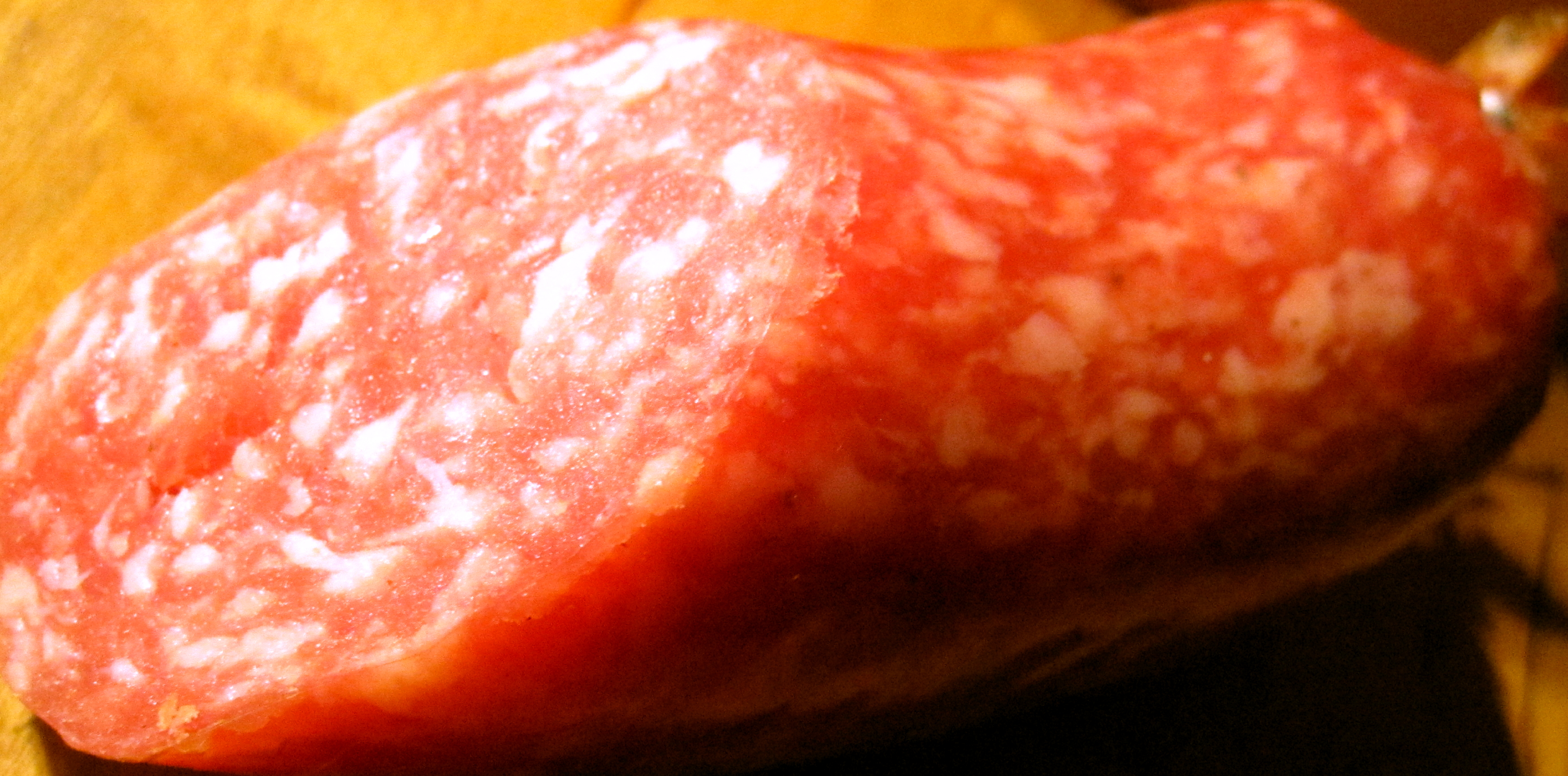
Mettwurst sausage

In 1995 a 4-year-old girl died from a fatal stroke after eating mettwurst produced by the Garibaldi company, and many other people were hospitalised. Toxins in the meat attacked blood vessels and kidneys. 23 children developed lifelong damage to their kidneys, suffering Hemolytic-uremic syndrome.

1996

In 1996, more than 500 people fell ill after consuming peanut butter contaminated with Salmonella. Around 50 of these cases were linked to Kraft peanut butter, where the peanuts had been contaminated with mouse droppings in the roasting process.

1999

Nippy's fresh chilled fruit juices were found to contain traces of Salmonella Typhimurium, infecting 507 people. Relevant juice products were recalled and the contamination was eventually traced to fruit from one supplier.

2007

In March 2007, Long and Linda Fou, owners of the Homebush French Golden Hot Bakery in NSW, pleaded guilty to handling and selling unsafe food. They were fined $42,000. 319 people were poisoned during the incident.

2010

Around 500 people alleged they had suffered thyroid dysfunction after dangerous levels of iodine were found in Bonsoy brand soy milk, due to the formulation used in the product between 2004 and 2009, which replaced pure kombu seaweed with kombu powder. In 2014, the milk's Japanese producers and Australian distributors agreed to pay a $25 million class action settlement—the largest ever food safety settlement in Australia.

2014

In December 2014, a 3-year-old girl died, apparently after drinking raw milk sold as bath milk. Other children were admitted to hospital.

2015

In February 2015, a recall of frozen berries imported from China was issued after at least 12 people contracted hepatitis A following their consumption of the product. Poor hygiene by Chinese workers or contaminated water supplies in China are suspected as the cause.

2018

At least five people died, 17 became ill and one woman miscarried after eating rockmelon contaminated with Listeria monocytogenes. The outbreak was traced to Rombola Family Farms in the Riverina region of New South Wales. The NSW Food Authority recommends "vulnerable populations", which include children under 5 years, people over 70 years of age, diabetics, pregnant women, people with cancer and suppressed immune systems avoid consuming rockmelons. The authority also issues advice for the correct handling of rockmelons for the general public.

2018

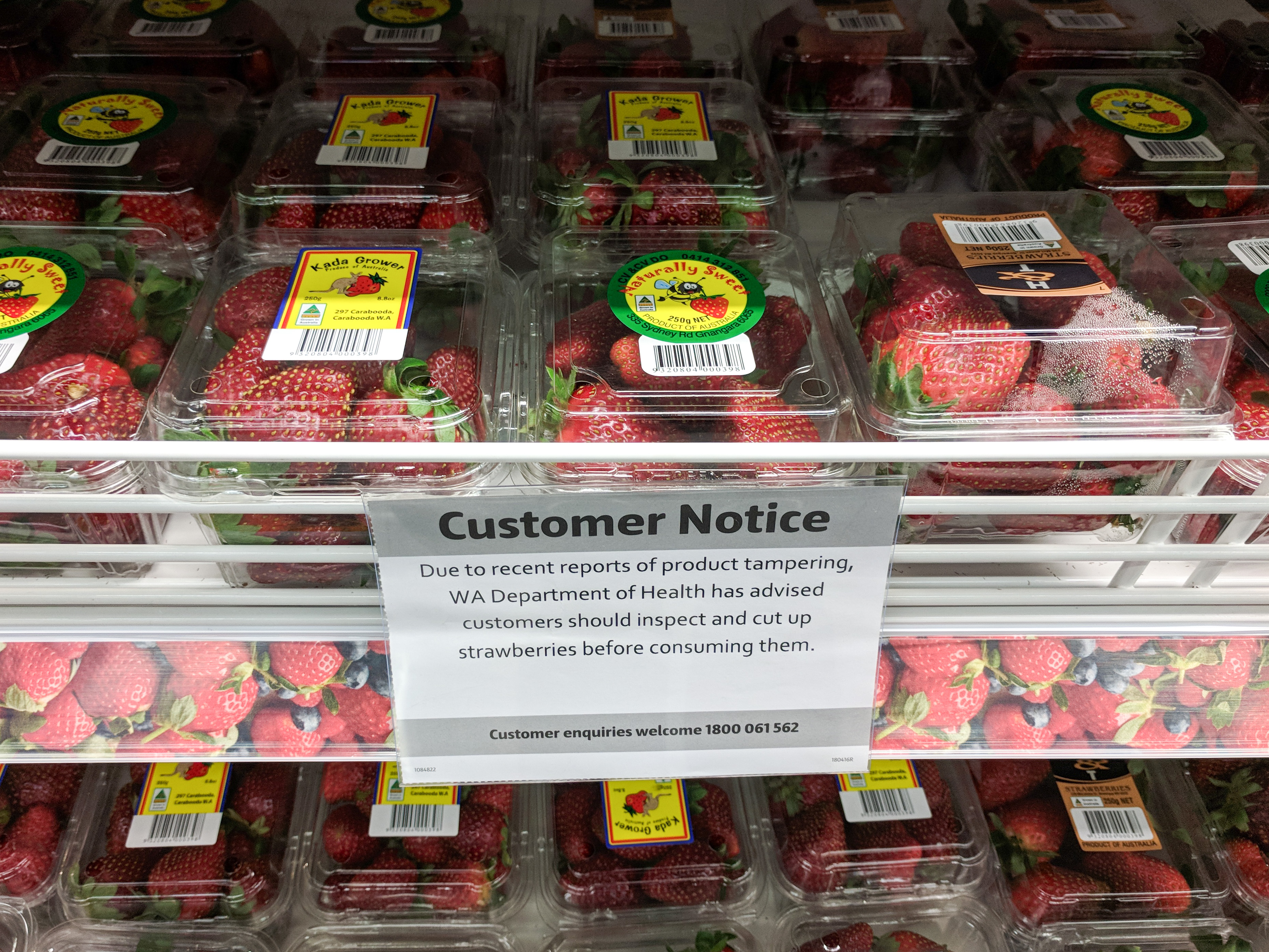
Strawberries on sale in Coles with a notice advising customers to inspect and cut up strawberries before consuming them

During September 2018 strawberries, originating initially from Queensland and later expanding to those from Western Australia were found contaminated with needles in Queensland, New South Wales, Victoria and South Australia. At least one person was hospitalised after swallowing part of a needle.

2024

The Food Safety Information Council has renewed warnings against foraging wild mushrooms in Australia, following recent deaths and poisonings. A 98-year-old woman died in May 2024 after eating death cap mushrooms from her garden. These mushrooms, toxic even when cooked, can cause fatal organ failure.

== See also ==
- Biosecurity in Australia
- Food safety
