= Australian Food Safety Information Council =

Health promotion charity

The Australian Food Safety Information Council is a health promotion charity The Council develops consumer-targeted food safety information to address the number of Australians getting sick from food poisoning by providing simple, easy to follow consumer information on the handling, storage and preparation of food. A study by Food Standards Australia New Zealand and the Australian National University in 2022 estimated there are 4.67 million cases of food poisoning in Australia each year that result in 47,900 hospitalisations, 38 deaths and a cost to the economy of $2.1 billion.

== History and governance ==
The council was founded in 1997 as the Food Safety Campaign Group and incorporated in 1999 as the Food Safety Information Council. It is supported by state and territory health and food safety agencies, local government, CSIRO, leading professional, industry and community organisations.

The current Council Chair is ANU Honorary Professor Dr Scott Crerar Previous Chairs have been Cathy Moir who was appointed in March 2019., Rachelle Williams who was appointed in July 2015, Professor Michael Eyles who was appointed in August 2007 and his predecessor was Professor Tom McMeekin AO. Before that Barry Shay was the 2nd Chair and the founding Chair was Bruce Bevan.

== Activities ==
The Food Safety Information Council provides consumer information on the handling, storage and preparation of food. They organize Australian Food Safety Week held during the second week of November each year.

To ensure the advice the Council provides is scientifically based, the Council has a Scientific Committee who vet all educational material before it is published.

The council also has a role in providing consumer advice on food recalls and emergencies such as the Listeria in rockmelons/canteloupes outbreak in March 2018 and frozen berries Hepatitis A recall in February 2015 They also take part in education events such as World Health Day which focussed on food safety.

== Research topics and education ==
As part of its educational activities, the Food Safety Information Council has carried out consumer research into food safety knowledge. The main causes were Norovirus, pathogenic Escherichia coli, Campylobacter spp. and non-typhoidal Salmonella spp., although the causes of approximately 80% of illnesses were unknown. A question and answer fact sheet published by the Australian Department of Health together with this study references the Food Safety Information Council's consumer advice as a means of reducing food borne disease. Most foodborne disease outbreaks in Australia have been linked to raw or minimally cooked eggs or poultry. The Food Safety Information Council estimates that one third of cases of food poisoning occur in the home.

=== Handwashing ===
Consumer research released in October 2019, found that more than 20% of Australians reported that they didn't always wash their hands after using the toilet and nearly 40% of respondents stated they didn't always wash before handling food. A further 43% of Australian adults said they don't always wash after handing raw eggs. The research showed gender differences, as men were less likely than women to always wash hands after going to the toilet (76% of men versus 82% of women) and before touching food (59% men versus 66% women). A 2025 survey got similar results. In the 2019 survey, people under age 34 were less likely to wash their hands.

A previous 2007 study found that 97 per cent of Australians knew that washing their hands before handling food is essential, this compared with 54 per cent who didn't wash their hands in 1997 – a 43 per cent improvement.

=== Eggs ===
The council's egg survey, published in November 2019, found that 25% of Australians over the age of 18 were consuming raw or minimally cooked eggs with 12% eating them at least once a month. Raw or lightly cooked egg dishes have been linked to cases of Salmonella infection in Australia

=== Lunch boxes ===
A 2012 lunchbox survey found almost 80 percent of adults take a packed lunch to work, yet many fail to make sure it's kept cool. About 17 percent admitted they made no effort to put their lunch in a fridge at work, and 29 per cent don't put them in coolers even if they're working outside.

=== Food safety risks ===
An October 2015 national Australian survey by OmniPoll for Australian Food Safety Week found that 71% of those Australians surveyed blamed pasteurized milk for food poisoning while 83% identified raw egg dishes as a problem and 12% even considered raw egg dishes unlikely to be a risk. The survey found that most people correctly recognised that chicken (95%), minced meat (90%) and seafood (96%) were food poisoning risks if not handled properly.

=== Cooking temperatures for riskier foods ===
An October 2016 national Australian survey by OmniPoll for Australian Food Safety Week 2017 showed that 70% of those surveyed reported that they didn't know the safe cooking temperature for foods high-risk foods such as hamburgers, sausages and poultry. Of those that reported they did know the correct temperature, most were wrong with 15% saying below the safe temperature of 75 °C and 9% stating it should be 100 °C or more.

=== Listeria ===
2018 Omnipoll research that shows that one in three Australians are either at risk of getting the potentially fatal Listeria infection themselves or live in a household with someone at risk. This research also showed a third of these people who are at risk, or living with someone at risk, had never heard or Listeria infection and two in ten of these couldn't name any of the foods they needed to avoid or cook to prevent Listeria infection.

=== Airfryers ===
A 2024 research study four 2 in 3 Australian households had an air fryer but only 44% found air fryer cooking instructions most of the time on packaged food.

=== Food poisoning causes ===
In 2025 66% of Australians surveyed recall experiencing some form of food poisoning or gastro and 51% of those incorrectly blame the last thing they ate
