= Minister for Biosecurity =

- Coat of arms of New Zealand

- Flag of New Zealand

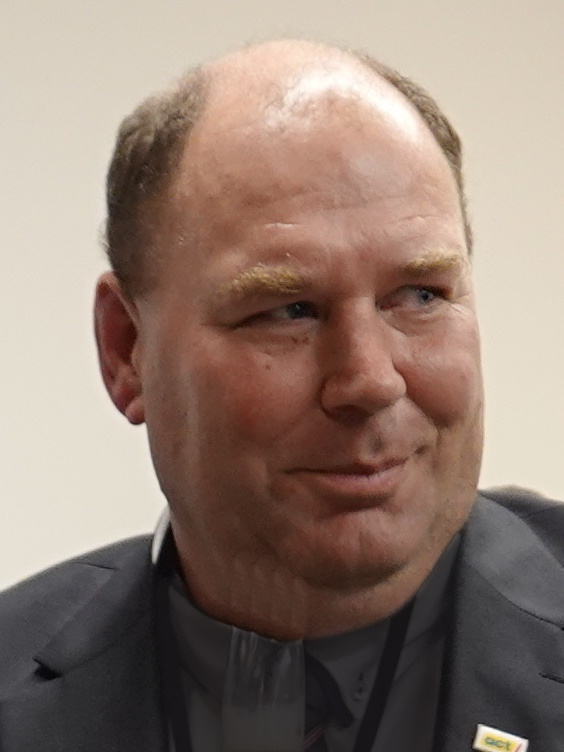
- Incumbent; Andrew Hoggard since 27 November 2023
- Style: The Honourable
- Member of: Cabinet of New Zealand; Executive Council
- Reports to: Prime Minister of New Zealand
- Appointer: Governor-General of New Zealand
- Term length: At His Majesty's pleasure
- Formation: 16 December 1996
- First holder: Simon Upton

The Minister for Biosecurity is a minister in the New Zealand Government with the responsibility of managing biosecurity.

The current Minister for Biosecurity is Andrew Hoggard.

== History ==
The portfolio was created after the 1996 general election. Previously, biosecurity matters had been under the purview of the Minister of Agriculture; it was John Falloon, acting in that portfolio, who had been responsible for the passage of the Biosecurity Act 1993. Briefly from 1998 to 1999 and again from 2011 to 2017, the portfolio was consolidated with other primary industries portfolios, first as the Minister for Food, Fibre, Biosecurity and Border Control and latterly as the Minister for Primary Industries.

== List of ministers for biosecurity ==
The following ministers have held the office of Minister for Biosecurity.

Color key (for political parties)
National	Labour	Progressive	ACT

No.	Name	Portrait	Term of office		Prime Minister
1	Simon Upton		16 December 1996	8 December 1997	Bolger
2	John Luxton (Note: From 31 August 1998 until 10 December 1999, the portfolio was titled Minister for Food, Fibre, Biosecurity and Border Control and responsibility for the former Biosecurity portfolio was delegated to the associate minister, David Carter.)		8 December 1997	10 December 1999	Bolger
2	John Luxton		8 December 1997	10 December 1999	Shipley
3	Marian Hobbs		10 December 1999	23 February 2001	Clark
4	Jim Sutton		28 March 2001 (Note: Sutton acted in the portfolio from 23 February 2001.)	19 October 2005	Clark
5	Jim Anderton		19 October 2005	19 November 2008	Clark
6	David Carter		19 November 2008	14 November 2011	Key
Office not in use: See Minister for Primary Industries
7	Damien O'Connor		26 October 2017	27 November 2023	Ardern
7	Damien O'Connor		26 October 2017	27 November 2023	Hipkins
8	Andrew Hoggard		27 November 2023	Incumbent	Luxon
