= Joint Food Standards Treaty =

1995 Australia-New Zealand treaty

Agreement between the Government of Australia and the Government of New Zealand Concerning a Joint Food Standards System
- Signed: 5 December 1995
- Location: Wellington, New Zealand
- Effective: 5 July 1996
- Parties: Australia; New Zealand
- Citations: [1996] ATS 12
- Language: English

The Joint Food Standards Treaty is a bilateral treaty between Australia and New Zealand, signed in Wellington on 5 December 1995, which entered into force on 5 July 1996. It constitutes the legal basis for the two countries' harmonised system of food standards, the chief elements of which are Food Standards Australia New Zealand (FSANZ) and the Australia New Zealand Food Standards Code (ANZFSC).
