= Food Standards Australia New Zealand =

Australian government body

- FSANZ

Agency overview
- Formed: 1991
- Employees: 102 (2016)
- Website: Official website

Food Standards Australia New Zealand (FSANZ) (Māori: Te Mana Kounga Kai – Ahitereiria me Aotearoa), formerly Australia New Zealand Food Authority (ANZFA), is the statutory authority in the Australian Government Health portfolio that is responsible under the Joint Food Standards Treaty for developing the Australia New Zealand Food Standards Code, which contains food standards for Australia and New Zealand.

== Description ==
FSANZ develops the standards in consultation with experts, other government agencies and stakeholders; the standards are enforced by state and territory departments, agencies and local councils in Australia, the Ministry for Primary Industries in New Zealand, and the Australian Department of Agriculture, Water and the Environment for food imported into Australia. According to legislation, the recommendations made by the body should be open and accountable, and based upon a rigorous scientific assessment of risk to public health and safety, though FSANZ's commitment to this has been disputed by leading public health and consumer representatives across Australia and New Zealand.

All decisions made by FSANZ must be approved by the Australia and New Zealand Food Regulation Ministerial Council, which is composed of the Health Minister from each of the Australian states and territories, and the Health Minister from New Zealand, and other participating Ministers nominated by each jurisdiction.

Publications from FSANZ include the Australian Total Diet Survey and Shoppers' Guide to Food Additives and labels.

== History ==
FSANZ began as an Australia-only agency, the National Food Authority, established under the National Food Authority Act 1991. In 1995, the National Food Authority's jurisdiction was extended to New Zealand, under the Joint Food Standards Treaty, and it was consequently renamed the Australia New Zealand Food Authority (ANZFA). It subsequently adopted its present name, Food Standards Australia New Zealand, in 2001.

== Nomenclature ==
This authority is sometimes cited variously as Australia and New Zealand Food Standards/Safety Authority (ANZFSA), possibly incorrect nomenclature arising due to confusion with the old initialism ANZFA, and with the acronym of the New Zealand authority, New Zealand Food Safety, which previously managed such questions in New Zealand.

== Fellows ==
In 2000, FSANZ established a programme to appoint fellows to provide expert advice. As of 2024, there are 24 such fellows. Notable fellows include Louise Burke, Jim Mann, Cliona Ni Mhurchu, Indrawati Oey, and Nicole Roy.

== See also ==
- Australian Competition & Consumer Commission
- Australian Food Safety Information Council
- Food quality
- Food safety
- Food safety in Australia
- Food safety in New Zealand
- New Zealand Food Safety Authority
- Standards Australia
