= Food Act 2014 =

Act of Parliament in New Zealand

New Zealand Parliament
- Assented to: 6 June 2014
- Administered by: Ministry for Primary Industries

Legislative history
- Bill title: Food Bill 160-2

Repeals
- Food Act 1981
- Status: Current legislation

The Food Act is a New Zealand Act of Parliament passed in 2014. It came into force on 1 March 2016 and progressively replaced the Food Act 1981 for the next three years.

It was introduced as the Food Bill 160-2 on 26 May 2010 to make some fundamental changes to New Zealand's domestic food regulatory regime. Significantly, for an export led economic recovery for New Zealand, the domestic food regulatory regime is the platform for exports. The New Zealand domestic standard is used as the basis for negotiating equivalence arrangements with trading partners. This minimizes the excessive importing country requirements that may be imposed but which do not go to food safety. If passed into law and fully implemented, it would replace the Food Act 1981 and the Food Hygiene Regulations 1974. Food Bill will also make consequential amendments to the Animal Products Act 1999 and the Wine Act 2003 to improve the interface of regulatory processes across food sectors.

== Background ==
- In 2009, the New Zealand Food Safety Authority prepared a Regulatory Impact Statement (RIS) to cover a "Reformed Food Regulatory Regime". In it the Agency outlines its theory about the importance of negotiating equivalence arrangements with New Zealand's trading partners on the first page.
- A background justification for an appropriate food law to be used by countries worldwide was jointly developed by the Food and Agriculture Organization of the United Nations (FAO) and World Health Organization (WHO). In 2005 FAO & WHO produced a document called Perspectives and guidelines on food legislation, with a new model food law which presents three model food laws that serve as the template(s) from which Food Bill 160-2 was subsequently elaborated.
  - FAO and WHO also established a body known as the Codex Alimentarius Commission in 1963

== Codex Alimentarius ==
- Codex Alimentarius (Latin for "Book of Food") is a collection of internationally recognised standards, codes of practice, guidelines and other recommendations relating to foods, food production and food safety.
- Codex is controversial
- Codex Alimentarius is recognised by the World Trade Organization as an international reference point for the resolution of disputes.

=== New Zealand’s Strategic Objectives in Codex ===
- MAF manages New Zealand's participation in Codex and sets strategic priorities which ensure that Codex standards have the widest possible application.
- New Zealand attaches great importance to the work of Codex and has been a member since its formation in 1962. The New Zealand Food Safety Authority (NZFSA), as the lead agency, is responsible for managing New Zealand's input and participation in Codex.
- In 2009, NZFSA developed a new Statement of Intent which underlines New Zealand's commitment to a risk-based regulatory system and standards development programme, underpinned by sound science, and an effective government role in facilitating commerce and market access. This also provides a framework for challenging protectionism and technical barriers to trade in the global trading environment. Therefore, in alignment with its domestic position, New Zealand has an interest in ensuring that Codex standards, and related texts, are risk-based and founded on sound science and that Codex is efficient and responsive to the needs of its members. Furthermore, as a trading nation, New Zealand sees the work of Codex as central to reducing technical barriers to trade and facilitating greater market access through the development of sound international standards with wide application.

=== Food Bill gateway to Codex ===
- Food Bill includes provisions to implement Codex Alimentarius regulations into New Zealand's domestic food regime through two primary mechanisms:
  - Material incorporated by reference:
    - The term "incorporation by reference" is used to describe a technique that gives legal effect to provisions contained in a document without repeating those provisions in the text of the incorporating legislation.
    - Food Bill section 403 Material incorporated by reference
  - By Order in Council (with no requirement for public consultation)
    - Food Bill Section 346 "The Governor-General may, by Order in Council made on the recommendation of the Minister, make regulations setting standards in relation to food that specify the criteria that all or any of the following must meet to ensure that food is safe and suitable"
    - Food Bill Section 355 "Regulations about definitions (1) The Governor-General may, by Order in Council made on the recommendation of the Minister, make regulations – (a) declaring anything to be food for the purposes of this Act"
  - Domestic regulations must match export regulations
    - Food Bill SOP 276, Section 346 – "Regulations about standards in relation to food – (6) Regulations made under this section must not set a standard for food sold for export that is different from the standard set for food sold on the domestic market."

== History ==
- Date of Domestic Food Review (DFR): 2002–2006
- Date of Introduction: 26 May 2010
- Select Committee: Primary Production
- Closing date for public submissions was originally: Thursday, 2 September 2010
- Date of report back from Select Committee: 16 December 2010
- Food Safety Minister Kate Wilkinson was dumped and a new Minister Nikki Kaye was appointed on 22 Jan 2013
- Food Bill Supplementary Order Paper 278 was released 17 July 2013, termed a Substantive amendment, 456 pages long
  - Closing date for public submissions was 16 Aug 2013.
  - Primary Production Select Committee receives 567 written submissions
  - Primary Production Select Committee hears 19 of the 567 submissions in person in Wellington 20-21 Feb 2014
  - Primary Production Select Committee releases a report on the Food Bill, with a recommendation that it be passed with amendments. 5 May 2014
- Food Bill Second Reading happened on 13 May 2014. Download Transcript here. Watch videos here
- Food Bill in Committee of the Whole House happened 14 May 2014. Download Transcript here. Watch videos here
- Food Bill Third Reading happened 27 May 2014. Download Transcript here. Watch videos here

=== Progress ===
- The Food Act 2014 becomes effective on 1 March 2016 when all new business will need to conform to the new Act and there will be a three-year transition period ending 28 February 2019 for all existing food premises that are not otherwise exempted to move over to either a Food Control Plan or National Programme.

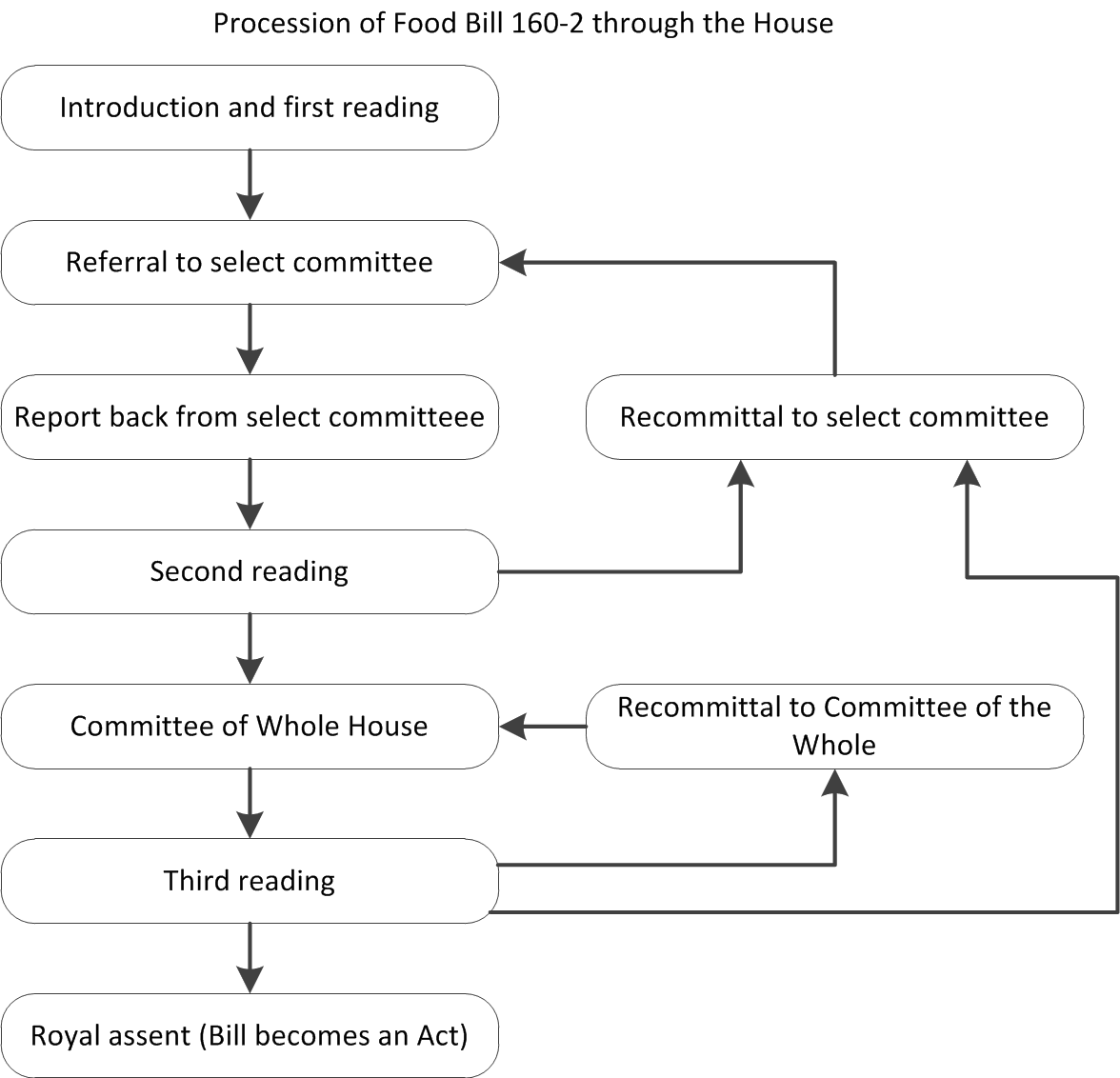

== Food legislation in other common law countries ==
New Zealand is one of 165 member nations of Codex Alimentarius. Other codex member nations are also passing or are proposing to pass similar legislative changes:

=== United States ===
- Food Safety Modernization Act
- Text as passed by Senate

=== Canada ===
- Canada Food Safety and Inspection Act
- Reaction
- BILL C-80 (first reading)
- BILL C-27: Canadian Food Inspection Agency Enforcement Act
- Current news on food biotechnology

== Related New Zealand Legislation ==
=== Trans Pacific Partnership Agreement (TPPA) ===
- Trans Pacific Partnership Agreement (TPP, or TPPA)

=== Hazardous Substances and New Organisms Act 1996 ===
- HSNO protects New Zealand against biological contamination from genetically modified organisms being introduced into New Zealand's unique island nation biodiversity.
- At least one New Zealand Minister of Parliament (Steffan Browning) has noted that the "genetic modification of food" has been deleted from the first draft of the Food Bill 160-2 as if the Minister for Food Safety is proposing that genetic modification is not a matter of food safety, which is very much as odds with the national opinion (New Zealand) on genetic modification.
- Hazardous Substances and New Organisms Act 1996
- Whereas USA production as of 2011 was 94% GMO Soy beans and 88% GMO Corn, New Zealand remains unadulterated to production of genetically modified organisms within its borders

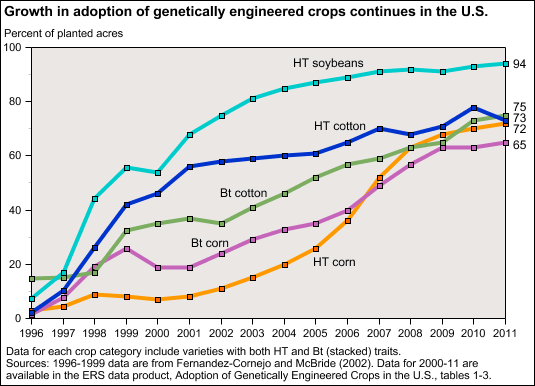

=== Natural Health Products Bill 324-1 ===
- Natural Health Products Bill 324-1

== Consultation with the public ==
The NZFSA (now part of MAF) commenced consultation on the Domestic Food Review in 2004 with a series of public discussion papers. The outcome of the Review was the proposals for the Food Bill. The public were actively consulted with from 2007 to 2010 on the Domestic Food Review and the Food Bill. This consultation has included forums and consumer groups, discussion papers and public submission processes. The publications and information on the Food Bill have been available throughout this process on the NZFSA website and were used to support consultation. During the public consultation on the Food Bill by the Primary Production Committee from 22 July to 2 September 2010, 66 submissions were received. These can be viewed on the Parliamentary website (see the link at the end of Q4).

Public enquiries by phone and email up until 2010 numbered 1670 and there have been over 70,000 page views for the Domestic Food Review, Food Bill and the Food Control Plan. A Consumers Forum was established in 2002 and met 3-4 times a year until November 2008 the Domestic Food Review and subsequently the Food Bill were regularly an item on their agenda. The Forum's mailing list included 61 consumer organisations and 88 individual representatives. More information on the Consumers Forum is here: Staying in touch with people

== Criticism and Public Concern ==
Concerns have been raised about a number of different aspects of the proposed Food Bill 160-2. They are broadly categorised as:

=== Food Bill Issues ===
1. The costs-of-food-sickness justification for Food Bill 160-2 were grossly exaggerated, and hence the real motives have not been fully disclosed by the New Zealand government.
2. Food sovereignty will be reduced by Food- Bill 160-2.
3. Food Bill 160-2 would restrict seed sharing and reduce biodiversity.
4. Food Bill 160-2 contains legal loopholes which would allow the Food Safety minister to make significant changes without public consultation.
5. Motives for Food Bill 160-2 are more about enhancing New Zealand trade than they are about food safety for New Zealanders.
6. Food Bill 160-2 will erode New Zealand Civil Liberties, principally due to powers afforded Food Safety Officers.
7. Food Bill 160-2 will be used to introduce additional Genetically Modified Organisms into New Zealand's domestic food supply.
8. New Zealand's local food regulations will be subject to international market forces because local regulations must match export regulations.
9. Compliance costs for small food producers.
10. Codex Alimentarius being forced upon New Zealand's food supply.
11. Maori culture being negatively impacted by Food Bill 160–2.

=== Codex Alimentarius Controversy ===
Critics say that once Codex standards become law, consumers will have inferior food rules imposed upon them, while food standards and trade will be completely controlled worldwide. Codex may ultimately:

- Prohibit the use of natural substances to prevent and treat disease
- Legalize genetically modified organisms
- Mandate antibiotics and hormones in animal feed
- Raise the allowable level of pesticides, toxins and drugs in foods
- Prohibit consumers from purchasing traditional herbs and medicines

=== Petition to oppose Food Bill ===
- An online petition was created in August 2011, stating: "Sharing food is a basic human right. The Food Bill 160-2 will seriously impede initiatives like community gardens, food co-ops, heritage seed banks, farmers markets, bake sales, and roadside fruit & vegetable stalls. Sign this petition to show that you oppose Food Bill 160-2"
- Within 5 months it had received over 40,000 signatures. As of May 2012 it has 42303 signatures which represent almost 1% of New Zealand's 4.36m population.
- While this demonstrates that the Food Bill is a matter of national concern, it falls far short of the requirements to trigger a citizen's initiated referendum, which would need votes equivalent to 10% of all eligible registered electors (approx. 300,000 votes required.)
- Even if a citizen's initiated referendum proceeded, it would be non-binding on the Government.
