= New Zealand Food Safety =

Former New Zealand government agency

- Haumaru Kai Aotearoa (Māori)

Agency overview
- Jurisdiction: New Zealand
- Minister responsible: Andrew Hoggard, Minister for Food Safety
- Parent agency: Ministry for Primary Industries
- Website: www.mpi.govt.nz/food-safety-home

New Zealand Food Safety (NZFS; Māori: Haumaru Kai Aotearoa), a business unit of the Ministry for Primary Industries, is the New Zealand government body responsible for food safety, and is the controlling authority for imports and exports of food and food-related products.

NZFS administers the Food Act 2014, the Animal Products Act 1999, and the Agricultural Compounds and Veterinary Medicines (ACVM) Act 1997 to ensure that food is safe and suitable for consumers.

In July 2007, the then New Zealand Food Safety Authority (NZFSA) was separated from the Ministry of Agriculture and Forestry to form a new Public Service Department. On 1 July 2010, the New Zealand Food Safety Authority (NZFSA) was amalgamated back into the Ministry of Agriculture and Forestry.In April 2012, it was merged into the Ministry for Primary Industries.

The NZFSA administered legislation covering:

- food for sale in New Zealand
- primary processing of animal products and official assurances related to their export
- exports of plant products and the controls surrounding registration, and
- use of agricultural compounds and veterinary medicines.

== Food Bill 160-2 ==
Food Bill 160-2 was introduced on 26 May 2010 to make some fundamental changes to New Zealand's domestic food regulatory regime. Significantly, for an export-led economic recovery for New Zealand, the domestic food regulatory regime is the platform for exports. The New Zealand domestic standard is used as the basis for negotiating equivalence arrangements with trading partners. This minimizes the excessive importing country requirements that may be imposed but which do not go to food safety. If passed into law and fully implemented, it would replace the Food Act 1981 and the Food Hygiene Regulations 1974. Food Bill will also make consequential amendments to the Animal Products Act 1999 and the Wine Act 2003 to improve the interface of regulatory processes across food sectors.

MAF (through NZFSA) managed New Zealand's participation in Codex Alimentarius and set strategic priorities which ensure that Codex standards have the widest possible application.

== See also ==
- About New Zealand Food Safety
- Food safety in New Zealand
- Food Standards Australia New Zealand
- Food Act 1981 - New Zealand
- Food Act 2014 - New Zealand
