= Andrew Hoggard =

New Zealand politician

The Honourable Andrew Hoggard MP
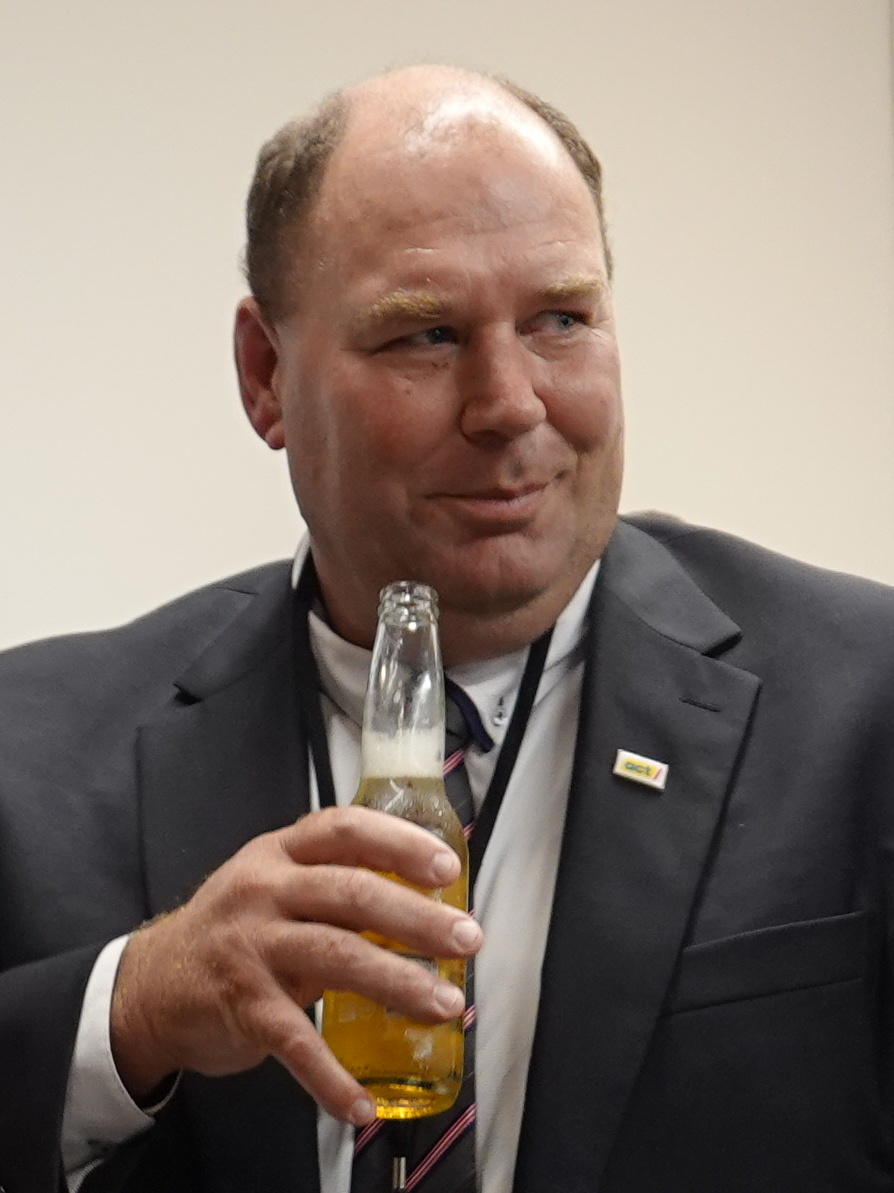
- Hoggard in 2024

8th Minister for Biosecurity
- Incumbent
- Assumed office 27 November 2023
- Prime Minister: Christopher Luxon
- Preceded by: Damien O'Connor

Member of the New Zealand Parliament for ACT party list
- Incumbent
- Assumed office 14 October 2023

President of Federated Farmers
- In office 26 June 2020 – 8 May 2023
- Preceded by: Katie Milne
- Succeeded by: Wayne Langford

Personal details
- Born: Andrew John Hoggard; 1974 or 1975 (age 51–52)
- Party: ACT (since 2019)
- Education: Heretaunga College
- Alma mater: Massey University
- Occupation: Dairy farmer

Andrew John Hoggard (born 1974 or 1975) is a New Zealand dairy farmer and politician.

Hoggard held leadership roles with the farmers' advocacy group Federated Farmers from 2014 to 2023, including as president for the final three years. He stepped down ahead of his election to the New Zealand House of Representatives as an ACT New Zealand list Member of Parliament.

He is Minister for Biosecurity and Minister for Food Safety in the Sixth National Government.

== Early life ==
Hoggard was born in 1974 or 1975, the eldest son of Mike and Lynette Hoggard. He was educated at Heretaunga College in Upper Hutt, and went on to study at Massey University, graduating with a Bachelor of Agricultural Economics degree in 1996.

== Farming career ==
The Hoggards moved from Upper Hutt to a 186-hectare (460-acre) farm at Kiwitea in Manawatū in 1998, with Andrew 50% sharemilking 440 Holstein Friesian cows on the farm owned by his parents.

In 2001, Hoggard competed in the Taranaki–Manawatū regional final of the Young Farmer of the Year contest. The following year, he was again a regional finalist in the event, placing third, and in 2003 he won the Taranaki–Manawatū Young Farmer of the Year title. He went on to compete in the 2003 national final, but finished outside the top four. In 2004, Hoggard finished third in the Taranaki–Manawatū regional final.

Hoggard served as chair of the Federated Farmers Dairy Industry Group from 2014 to 2017, and was Federated Farmers vice-president from 2017 to 2020. On 26 June 2020, he succeeded Katie Milne as president of the organisation. He was elected to the board of the International Dairy Federation in November 2020. Hoggard resigned as Federated Farmers president on 8 May 2023, two months before his term of office was due to end.

In October 2022 Hoggard, as Federated Farmers national president, criticised the Labour Government's plans to tax the emissions produced by farm animals by 2025. Agricultural emissions by farm animals including burping and urination account for about half of New Zealand's emissions. Hoggard claimed that the tax would hurt the farming sector by discouraging farmers from making a living.

== Political career ==
New Zealand Parliament
Years	Term	Electorate	List	Party
2023–2026	54th	List	5	ACT
2026–present	55th	List	3	ACT

Hoggard became a member of ACT New Zealand in 2019. On 9 May 2023, one day after stepping down as president of Federated Farmers, he was named as the ACT candidate in the Rangitīkei electorate for the 2023 New Zealand general election. Hoggard was subsequently ranked fifth on ACT's party list for the election.

=== First term, 2023–2026 ===
During the 2023 election, Hoggard came third place in the Rangitīkei electorate, which was won by National Party candidate Suze Redmayne. He was however elected to Parliament on the ACT party list.

Following the formation of the National-led coalition government, Hoggard became Minister for Biosecurity, Minister for Food Safety, Associate Minister of Agriculture, and Associate Minister of the Environment in late November 2023. In the agriculture portfolio he is responsible for animal welfare, skills and significant natural areas. In the environment portfolio he is responsible for the Jobs for Nature programme, biodiversity, and freshwater regulations for farmers.

On 14 March 2024 Hoggard, as Associate Environment Minister, announced that the government would suspend the obligation for councils to impose Significant Natural Areas (SNAs) under the previous Sixth Labour Government's National Policy Statement for Indigenous Biodiversity for three years, while the Resource Management Act 1991 is being replaced. Significant Natural Areas are places in New Zealand where rare or threatened plants or animals are found. Their protection was previously required under the Resource Management Act. On 15 March he released a statement saying his 14 March comment had been misunderstood: "To be clear, there has been no change to statutory and regulatory obligations on councils at this point. If my statement has been read in a way that suggested that the change had already come into effect, this was not the intention". University of Otago law Professor Andrew Geddis said the statement was "misleading at best, and borderline unlawful at worst. No minister can by mere announcement remove an existing legal obligation imposed by a parliamentary enactment."

In August 2024, Hoggard as Minister for Food Safety announced the government was not going to sign up to new infant formula quality standards developed by Food Standards Australia New Zealand and would instead develop a separate New Zealand standard over the next five years. The announcement was welcomed by the dairy industry but was criticised by the New Zealand College of Midwives. In April 2025 RNZ reported that Hoggard had been heavily lobbied by dairy industry representatives, including his sister. Soon after, RNZ reported that the government was considering signing up to the standards, following a change of position by the dairy lobbyists.

In early December 2024, Hoggard as Biosecurity Minister halted all New Zealand poultry exports following an outbreak of the H7N6 subtype of avian influenza at a Moeraki farm.

In October 2025, Hoggard announced a rewrite of pig welfare laws, cancelling the previous government's plans to ban farrowing crates in favor of a legislative amendment that retained them with stricter regulations and a 10-year transition period. Released documents subsequently revealed that the National Animal Welfare Advisory Committee (NAWAC), the government's independent expert body, had disagreed with the reforms, advising that the continued confinement of sows likely did not meet the standards of the Animal Welfare Act.

On 10 March 2026, Hoggard as Associate Agricultural Minister confirmed that the Government would not progress with an ACT and National pledge to reverse the previous government's ban on live animal exports during the 54th New Zealand Parliamentary term, stating that he had been unable to secure consensus within the New Zealand Cabinet. He said that the Government would instead focus on implementing its reforms to the Resource Management Act 1991.

On 11 May 2026, Hoggard confirmed that the Government would support the creation of investor-funded voluntary carbon and nature projects. In 12 May, Hoggard expressed support for an "open seat rule" to allow school children to use rural school buses in order to boost rural school attendance.

=== Second term, 2026–present ===
During the 2026 New Zealand general election, Hoggard was ranked third on the ACT a party list and contested the Rangitīkei electorate. Based on preliminary elections, Hoggard came fourth place in the Rangitīkei electorate with 3,248 votes. He was re-elected to Parliament on the ACT party list.
