= Australia New Zealand Food Standards Code =

Legislation

The Australia New Zealand Food Standards Code (ANZFSC) is the legal code governing food safety and food labelling in Australia and New Zealand. It is administered by Food Standards Australia New Zealand. Officially, it is issued as Australian secondary legislation and then adopted by New Zealand secondary legislation. It contains certain chapters labelled as "Australia only" which do not apply in New Zealand, and the New Zealand government has the discretion to refuse to adopt amendments which it disagrees with–an example is New Zealand's decision not to adopt the new Kava standard which significantly reduced the legal availability of Kava, on the grounds that doing so interfered with the cultural rights of Pasifika peoples. Within Australia, enforcement of the Code for domestically produced products is primarily the responsibility of the state and territory governments, with the federal government's enforcement role focused on food imports.

== History ==
In 1995, Australia and New Zealand signed the Joint Food Standards Treaty, which provided the legal basis for the Code. In New Zealand, the Code was adopted in February 2001 and entered fully into force in December 2002.

== Contents ==
The Code is divided into four chapters:

- Chapter 1 contains standards that apply to all foods, including labelling requirements, additives, contaminants, genetically modified foods. All the standards in this chapter apply to both Australia and New Zealand, except for Standards 1.4.2 (Agvet chemicals) and 1.6.2 (Processing requirements for meat), which apply to Australia only.
- Chapter 2 contains chapters for specific types of foods, which each chapter only governing foods of that type. All the standards in this chapter apply to both countries, except for Standard 2.8.3 (Native bee honey) which applies in Australia only, and Standard 2.9.6 (Transitional standard for special purpose foods (including amino acid modified foods)), which applies in New Zealand only.
- Chapter 3 contains food safety standards which apply to Australia only, focused on retail premises and equipment used for food preparation, and commercial kitchens (restaurants, cafes, canteens, hospitals and prisons, etc.)
- Chapter 4 contains food safety standards which apply to Australia only, focused on safe primary production and manufacturing of foodstuffs

== Criticisms ==
The Code's cheese-making standards have been criticised as a "a wholly dysfunctional combination of prescriptive and performance-based regulation".
