= Standards of identity for food =

What a food product must contain to be marketed under a certain name

Standards of identity for food are mandatory requirements that are set by a governing body to determine what a food product must contain to be marketed under a certain name in allowable commerce. Mandatory standards, which differ from voluntary grades and standards applied to agricultural commodities, protect the consumer by ensuring a label accurately reflects what is inside (for example, that mayonnaise is not an imitation spread or that ice cream is not a similar but different frozen dessert).

A US trade organization defines the term as follows:

A standard of identity sets out what ingredients a product must contain, which ingredients it may contain, and any requirements of manufacturing.

For example, "whisky" is defined as "a potable alcoholic distillate obtained from a mash of cereal grain saccharified by diastase of malt or by other enzymes and fermented by the action of yeast". It may contain caramel and flavouring. No other ingredients are allowed. If someone were to produce a whisky containing a dye, they would not be permitted to call the product "whisky", since dye is not a permitted additive.

Standards of identity are set out in the Food and Drug Regulations. They may be identified by the symbol "[S]" following the product name in boldface type. As such, they are official common names for products and no other name can be substituted.

A 2014 lawsuit in the United States illustrated one usage of such regulations. When Hampton Creek implied in its advertising that mayonnaise being marketed by Unilever was not "real" mayonnaise, the latter sued Hampton for defamation and cited the definitions promulgated by the Food and Drug Administration.

== United States ==
Each individual state within the United States reserves the authority to set standards of identity for foods marketed within that state. In addition, the departments of the federal government carry authority to set requirements for food products that are offered for interstate commerce. Such standards are issued by the U.S. Department of Agriculture, the Food and Drug Administration or the Bureau of Alcohol, Tobacco, Firearms and Explosives.

== Canada ==
The Canadian Food Inspection Agency issues standards of identity.

== Australia and New Zealand ==
The Commonwealth nations use many of the same terms employed by the Canadian Food Inspection Agency. Food Standards Australia New Zealand, formerly Australia New Zealand Food Authority (ANZFA), is the governmental body responsible for developing food standards for Australia and New Zealand.

== France ==
- Appellation d'Origine Contrôlée (AOC), "term of controlled origin" is the French certification granted to certain French geographical indications for wines, cheeses, butters, and other agricultural products.

== Italy ==
Denominazione di Origine Controllata is the Italian quality assurance label for food products and especially wines.

== In PDOs around the world ==
- Protected designation of origin – Geographical indication of food origin
  - List of Protected Designation of Origin products by country

== See also ==
- Codex Alimentarius – Collection of internationally recognized food standards
- FDA Food Safety Modernization Act – 2011 United States law
