= Salmonella virus SopEphi =

Felsduovirus SopEphi

Virus classification
- (unranked): Virus
- Realm: Duplodnaviria
- Kingdom: Heunggongvirae
- Phylum: Uroviricota
- Class: Caudoviricetes
- Order: Caudovirales (abolished 2021)
- Family: Myoviridae
- Genus: Felsduovirus
- Species: Felsduovirus SopEphi

Virus

Salmonella virus SopEphi is a virus of the family Peduoviridae, genus Felsduovirus.

As a member of group I of the Baltimore classification, Salmonella virus SopEphi is a dsDNA viruses. All the family Myoviridae members share a nonenveloped morphology consisting of a head and a tail separated by a neck. Its genome is linear. The propagation of the virions includes attaching to a host cell (a bacterium, as Salmonella virus SopEphi is a bacteriophage) and the injection of the double stranded DNA; the host transcribes and translates it to manufacture new particles. To replicate its genetic content requires host cell DNA polymerases and, hence, the process is highly dependent on the cell cycle.
