= Food Act 1981 =

Act of Parliament in New Zealand

New Zealand Parliament
- Long title: An Act to consolidate and amend the law relating to the sale of food
- Assented to: 14 October 1981

Amended by
- Food Amendment Act 1996 Food Amendment Act 2002 and others

Repealed by
- Food Act 2014
- Status: Repealed

The Food Act 1981 was an Act of Parliament in New Zealand. It is administered by the Ministry for Primary Industries.

The Food Act 2014 replaced the Food Act progressively over three years from when it came into force in 2016.

== Provisions ==
Whereas previous food legislation in New Zealand had primarily focused on the purity of foods, the Food Act 1981 was a consumer protection law focused on the regulation of food sales, advertising, hygiene, and safety standards. It was the principal act governing food safety in the country until its repeal and replacement by the Food Act 2014, which came into full effect on 28 February 2019.

Alongside the Food Hygiene Regulations 1974 and the Health Act 1956, it mandated that the manufacturing, packaging, processing, and sale of food occur in registered food premises.

Under the provisions of the Food Act 1981, Governor General of New Zealand David Beattie presided over an Order in Council to introduce the Dietary Supplements Regulations 1985, as a way to regulate dietary supplements.

== See also ==
- Food safety in New Zealand
