= Food Safety Initiative =

The Food Safety Initiative is an interagency initiative begun under the Clinton administration in 1997 to coordinate the activities of the Food and Drug Administration (FDA), the Centers for Disease Control and Prevention (CDC), Environmental Protection Agency (EPA), and the Department of Agriculture (USDA) Food Safety and Inspection Service to reduce the annual incidence of foodborne illness.
