= Food safety =

Scientific discipline

Food safety (or food hygiene) is a scientific method describing handling, preparation, and storage of food in a way or ways that prevent foodborne illness. Food contamination consists of harmful substances in food that can make it unsafe to eat. There are types of contaminations that consist of biological, chemical, and physical contamination. The occurrence of two or more cases of similar illness resulting from the ingestion of a common food is known as a food-borne disease outbreak.

Food safety includes a number of routines that should be followed to avoid potential health hazards. In this way, food safety often overlaps with food defense to prevent harm to consumers. The tracks within this line of thought are safety between industry and the market and then between the market and the consumer. In considering industry-to-market practices, food safety considerations include the origins of food including the practices relating to food labeling, food hygiene, food additives and pesticide residues; as well as policies on biotechnology and food and guidelines for the management of governmental import and export inspection and certification systems for foods. In considering market-to-consumer practices, the usual thought is that food ought to be safe in the market and the concern is safe delivery and preparation of the food for the consumer. Food safety, nutrition and food security are closely related. Unhealthy food creates a cycle of disease and malnutrition that affects infants and adults as well.

Food can transmit pathogens, which can result in the illness or death of the person or other animals. The main types of pathogens are bacteria, viruses, parasites, and fungus. The World Health Organization estimated that foodborne pathogens cause 866 million cases of diseases and 1.52 million deaths per year. Food can also serve as a growth and reproductive medium for pathogens. In developed countries, there are intricate standards for food preparation, whereas in lesser developed countries there are fewer standards and less enforcement of those standards. Food poisoning cannot be completely avoided due to the number of persons involved in the supply chain, as well as the fact that pathogens can be introduced into foods.

== Issues ==
Food safety issues and regulations concern:

- Agriculture and animal husbandry practices
- Food manufacturing practices
- Food additives
- Novel foods
- Genetically modified foods
- Food label
- Food contamination

== Food contamination ==
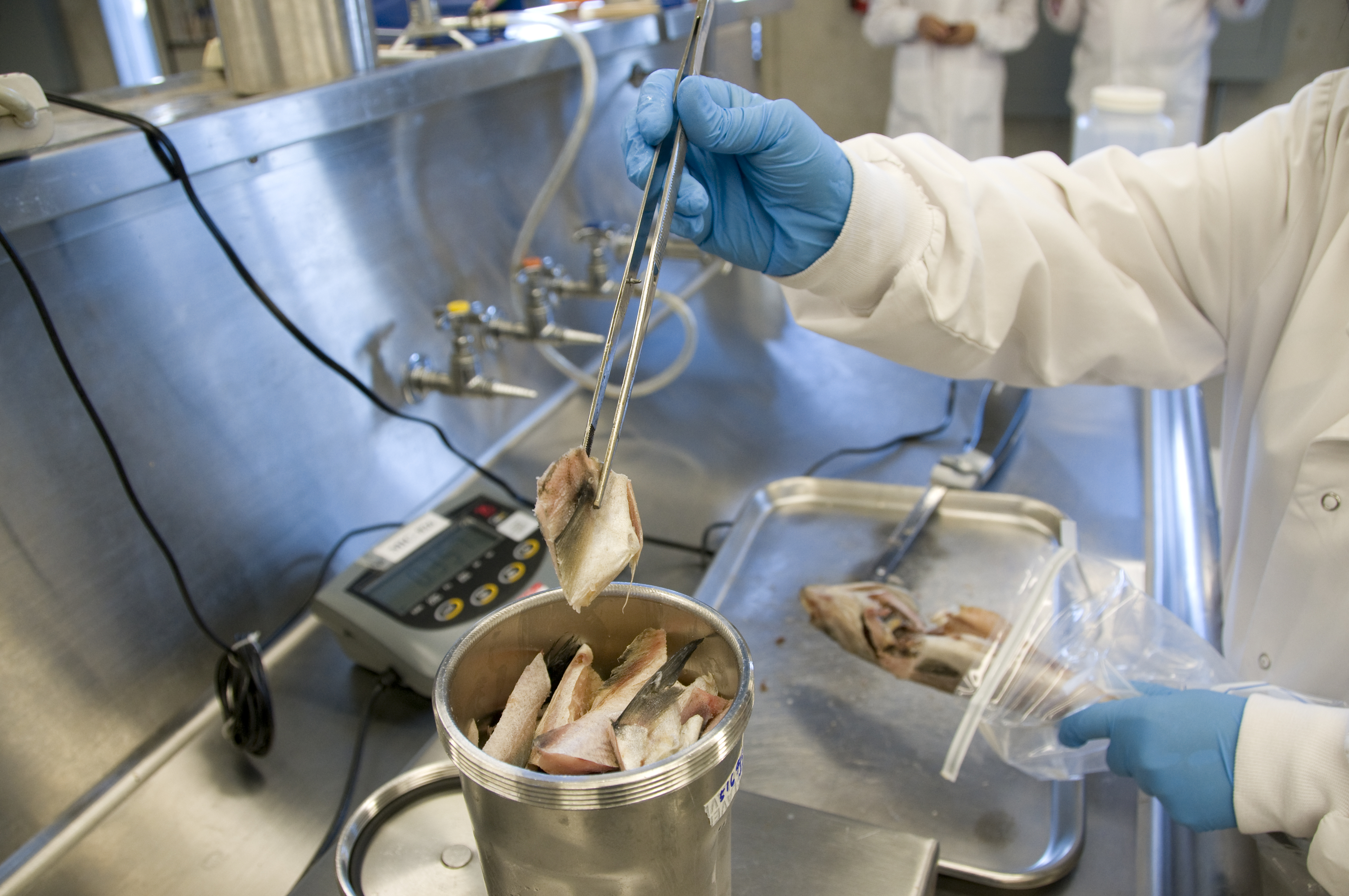
FDA lab tests seafood for microorganisms.

Food contamination happens when foods are corrupted with another substance. It can happen in the process of production, transportation, packaging, storage, sales, and cooking process. Contamination can be physical, chemical, or biological.

=== Physical contamination ===
Physical contaminants (or 'foreign bodies') are objects such as hair, plant stalks or pieces of plastic and metal. When a foreign object enters food, it is a physical contaminant. If the foreign objects contain bacteria, both physical and biological contamination will occur. Common sources of physical contaminations include hair, glass or metal, pests, jewelry, dirt, and fingernails.

Physical food contamination is a hazardous yet natural accident of contaminating food with dangerous objects around the kitchen or production base when being prepared. If kitchens or other places where food may be prepared are unsanitary, it is very likely that physical contamination will occur and cause negative consequences. Dangerous objects such as glass and wire may be found in food which can cause many issues with the individuals who consume it including choking, breaking of teeth and cutting the insides of the body. Children and the elderly are at the highest risk of being harmed by food contamination due to their weaker immune systems and fragile structures. The most common reasoning for physical contamination to occur is when the food is left uncovered without lids. To prevent such contamination and harm to those consuming food from restaurants, cooks are recommended to wear hair nets, remove jewelry, and wear gloves when necessary, especially over wounds with bandages.

=== Chemical contamination ===
Chemical contamination happens when food is contaminated with a natural or artificial chemical substance. Some of the most common chemical contaminants consist of pesticides, industrial chemicals, heavy metals, and chemicals that migrate from packaging materials. Other sources can include: herbicides, veterinary drugs, contamination from environmental sources (water, air or soil pollution), cross-contamination during food processing, presence of natural toxins, or use of unapproved food additives and adulterants. The health effects that can come from chemical contamination include gastrointestinal problems, organ damage, neurological problems, increase in certain cancers, and reproductive and developmental problems.

==== How contamination enters food ====
One of the two main reasons for chemical contamination occurring is through agricultural production and from environmental exposure. During agricultural production pesticides, fertilizers, and chemicals are used on crops. Farmers use those to protect the crops, but they can leave residues that can stay on or inside food.

During environmental exposure, the plant is exposed to pollution, contaminated soil, and contaminated water. When these chemicals enter the plants, it can be absorbed naturally from polluted air, contaminated soil, or water sources. Animals can also absorb these substances through feed and environmental contact, which can even enter products such as meat and milk.

==== Processing and packaging ====
Contamination does not just originate from farms, it can still happen in the processing and the packaging stages. During processing, food is handled with machinery and industrial chemicals. Chemicals used during this process can contaminate the food.

Chemicals from packaging itself can move into the food when using materials such as plastics, coatings, and adhesives, especially when it is hot or has been in storage for a long period of time. This is known as chemical migration, which also tends to happen with fatty foods, as they are able to absorb it more. This raises concerns about food safety.

=== Biological contamination ===
Biological contamination happens when the food has been contaminated by substances produced by living creatures, such as humans, rodents, pests or microorganisms. This includes bacterial contamination, viral contamination, or parasite contamination that is transferred through saliva, pest droppings, blood or fecal matter. Bacterial contamination is the most common cause of food poisoning worldwide. If an environment is high in starch or protein, water, oxygen, has a neutral pH level, and maintains a temperature between 5 °C and 60 °C (danger zone) for even a brief period of time (~0–20 minutes), bacteria are likely to survive.

In April and May 2018, 26 states in the United States suffered an outbreak of the bacteria strain E. coli O157:H7, associated with tainted romaine lettuce. Several investigations show the contamination might have come from the Yuma, Arizona, growing region. This outbreak, which began 10 April, is the largest US flare-up of E. coli in a decade. One person in California died. At least 14 of the people affected developed kidney failure. The most common symptoms of E. coli include diarrhea, bloody diarrhea, abdominal pain, nausea and vomiting.

== Safe food handling procedures (from market to consumer) ==
The five key principles of food hygiene, according to the World Health Organization (WHO), are:

1. Prevent contaminating food with pathogens spreading from people, pets, and pests.
2. Separate raw and cooked foods to prevent contaminating the cooked foods.
3. Cook foods for the appropriate length of time and at the appropriate temperature to kill pathogens.
4. Store food at the proper temperature.
5. Use safe water and safe raw materials.

Proper storage, sanitary tools and work spaces, heating and cooling properly and to adequate temperatures, and avoiding contact with other uncooked foods can greatly reduce the chances of contamination. Tightly sealed water and air proof containers are good measures to limit the chances of both physical and biological contamination during storage. Using clean, sanitary surfaces and tools, free of debris, chemicals, standing liquids, and other food types (different from the kind currently being prepared, i.e. mixing vegetables/meats or beef/poultry) can help reduce the chance of all forms of contamination. However, even if all precautions have been taken and the food has been safely prepared and stored, bacteria can still form over time during storage. Food should be consumed within one to seven (1–7) days while it has been stored in a cold environment, or one to twelve (1–12) months if it was in a frozen environment (if it was frozen immediately after preparation). The length of time before a food becomes unsafe to eat depends on the type of food it is, the surrounding environment, and the method with which it is kept out of the danger zone.

- Always refrigerate perishable food within 2 hours—1 hour when the temperature is above 90 °F (32.2 °C).
- Check the temperature of your refrigerator and freezer with an appliance thermometer. The refrigerator should be at 40 °F (4.4 °C) or below and the freezer at 0 °F (−17.7 °C) or below.

ISO 22000 is a standard developed by the International Organization for Standardization dealing with food safety. This is a general derivative of ISO 9000. The ISO 22000 international standard specifies the requirements for a food safety management system that involves interactive communication, system management, prerequisite programs, and hazard analysis and critical control points principles. ISO 22000 was first published in 2005. It is the culmination of all previous attempts from many sources and areas of food safety concern to provide an end product that is safe as possible from pathogens and other contaminants. Every 5 years standards are reviewed to determine whether a revision is necessary, to ensure that the standards remain as relevant and useful to businesses as possible.

Although consumers often claim to understand the importance of hand washing during food preparation, observational studies consistently show that this practice is frequently neglected, particularly after handling raw meat. Inadequate hand washing contributes significantly to the risk of cross-contamination in domestic kitchens, as pathogens from raw foods can be easily transferred to ready-to-eat items.

== Incidence ==
A 2003 WHO report concluded that about 30% of reported food poisoning outbreaks in the WHO European Region occur in private homes. According to the WHO and Centers for Disease Control and Prevention (CDC), in the US alone, annually, there are 76 million cases of foodborne illness leading to 325,000 hospitalizations and 5,000 deaths.

== Food safety inspection ==
Health protection measures, specifically food safety inspections, play a crucial role in preventing foodborne illnesses and are implemented by governments globally. The challenge of quantifying the impact of foodborne illness arises from disparities in the effectiveness of public health surveillance systems, variations in reporting, co-morbidities, underreporting, diagnostic uncertainties, healthcare accessibility, and individual experiences of illness. In 2010, the WHO estimated approximately 600 million cases of foodborne illness worldwide, resulting in an estimated 420,000 deaths.

Governments worldwide have introduced health protection measures and regulatory systems to address foodborne illness. One such method is food safety inspection, which can take different forms at various stages of the food production system. Food safety inspection involves analyzing food samples to determine composition, contamination levels, or quality, particularly in the case of imported foods or those entering the consumer market. Additionally, traditional food safety inspection includes evaluating food handling practices and production environments, commonly applied in the food retail sector, food manufacturing, farms, and slaughterhouses. Inspectors often employ observational and qualitative methods to assess food handling practices and identify potential contamination risks.

The implementation of food safety inspection varies across jurisdictions. Some jurisdictions follow a prescriptive approach, setting specific food safety requirements for businesses and using inspection to measure compliance. This compliance-check approach typically involves inspection checklists and numerical scoring or grading systems, which may carry different weights for various non-compliance. Regulatory systems often prescribe actions based on score ranges, such as enforcement measures or adjustments to inspection frequency. The application of food safety inspection also differs in motivating compliance. Traditionally, inspections aimed to identify and report safety deficiencies to food business operators for resolution within a specified time frame. Regulatory frameworks may include compliance motivators such as monetary penalties and other enforcement measures triggered by inspection findings.

Artificial intelligence (AI) and machine learning (ML) are increasingly applied in food safety to detect foodborne hazards and contamination, and support risk prediction and assessment. These approaches can integrate chemical, microbiological, imaging, and supply-chain data to complement conventional food safety monitoring and inspection methods.

== Regulations by jurisdiction and agency ==
=== WHO and FAO ===
In 1963, the WHO and the UN Food and Agriculture Organization published the Codex Alimentarius, which serves as an guideline to food safety. However, according to Unit 04 – Communication of Health & Consumers Directorate-General of the European Commission:

The Codex, while being recommendations for voluntary application by members, Codex standards serve in many cases as a basis for national legislation. The reference made to Codex food safety standards in the World Trade Organizations' Agreement on Sanitary and Phytosanitary measures means that Codex has far reaching implications for resolving trade disputes. WTO members that wish to apply stricter food safety measures than those set by Codex may be required to justify these measures scientifically.

So, an agreement made in 2003, signed by all member states, inclusive all EU, in the codex Stan Codex 240 – 2003 for coconut milk, sulphite containing additives like E223 and E 224 are allowed till 30 mg/kg, does NOT mean, they are allowed into the EU, see Rapid Alert System for Food and Feed entries from Denmark: 2012.0834; 2011.1848; en 2011.168, "sulphite unauthorised in coconut milk from Thailand". Same for polysorbate E 435: see 2012.0838 from Denmark, unauthorised polysorbates in coconut milk and, 2007.AIC from France. Only for the latter the EU amended its regulations with (EU) No 583/2012 per 2 July 2012 to allow this additive, already used for decades and absolutely necessary.

=== Australia ===
Food Standards Australia New Zealand requires all food businesses to implement food safety systems. These systems are designed to ensure food is safe to consume and halt the increasing incidence of food poisoning, and they include basic food safety training for at least one person in each business.

Food safety training is delivered in various forms by, among other organisations, Registered Training Organisations (RTOs), after which staff are issued a nationally recognised unit of competency code on their certificate.

=== China ===
Food safety is a growing concern in Chinese agriculture. The Chinese government oversees agricultural production as well as the manufacture of food packaging, containers, chemical additives, drug production, and business regulation. In recent years, the Chinese government attempted to consolidate food regulation with the creation of the State Food and Drug Administration in 2003, and officials have also been under increasing public and international pressure to solve food safety problems. However, it appears that regulations are not well known by the trade. Labels used for "green" food, "organic" food and "pollution-free" food are not well recognized by traders and many are unclear about their meaning. A survey by the World Bank found that supermarket managers had difficulty in obtaining produce that met safety requirements and found that a high percentage of produce did not comply with established standards.

Traditional marketing systems, whether in China or the rest of Asia, presently provide little motivation or incentive for individual farmers to make improvements to either quality or safety as their produce tends to get grouped together with standard products as it progresses through the marketing channel. Direct linkages between farmer groups and traders or ultimate buyers, such as supermarkets, can help avoid this problem. Governments need to improve the condition of many markets through upgrading management and reinvesting market fees in physical infrastructure. Wholesale markets need to investigate the feasibility of developing separate sections to handle fruits and vegetables that meet defined safety and quality standards.

=== European Union ===
The European Commission and the Parliament of the European Union (EU) produce legislation in the form of directives and regulations, many of which are mandatory for member states and which therefore must be incorporated into individual countries' national legislation. As a very large organisation that exists to remove barriers to trade between member states, and into which individual member states have only a proportional influence, the outcome is often seen as an excessively bureaucratic 'one size fits all' approach. However, in relation to food safety the tendency to err on the side of maximum protection for the consumer may be seen as a positive benefit. The EU parliament is informed on food safety matters by the European Food Safety Authority.

Individual member states may also have other legislation and controls in respect of food safety, provided that they do not prevent trade with other states, and can differ considerably in their internal structures and approaches to the regulatory control of food safety.

From 13 December 2014, new legislation – the EU Food Information for Consumers Regulation 1169/2011 – require food businesses to provide allergy information on food sold unpackaged, in for example catering outlets, deli counters, bakeries and sandwich bars. A further addition to the 2014 legislation, named 'Natasha's Law', came into force in the United Kingdom in October 2021: Following the death of Natasha Ednan-Laperouse, who died after eating a sandwich containing the allergen sesame, foods pre-packed on premises for direct sale will require individual ingredients labelling – this replaces the historic requirement for outlets to provide ingredients information for these types of food upon request.

=== France ===
Agence nationale de sécurité sanitaire de l'alimentation, de l'environnement et du travail is a French governmental agency dealing with food safety.

=== Germany ===
The Federal Ministry of Food, Agriculture and Consumer Protection is a Federal Ministry of the Federal Republic of Germany.

The Federal Office of Consumer Protection and Food Safety is under the control of the Federal Ministry of Food, Agriculture and Consumer Protection. It exercises several duties, with which it contributes to safer food and thereby intensifies health-based consumer protection in Germany. Food can be manufactured and sold within Germany without a special permission, as long as it does not cause any damage on consumers' health and meets the general standards set by the legislation. However, manufacturers, carriers, importers and retailers are responsible for the food they pass into circulation. They are obliged to ensure and document the safety and quality of their food with the use of in-house control mechanisms.

=== Greece ===
In Greece, the Hellenic Food Authority governing body supervised by the Ministry of the Environment and Energy (Greek: Υπουργείο Περιβάλλοντος και Ενέργειας), it is in charge of ensuring food sold is safe and fit for consumption. It controls the food business operators including agricultural producers, food processors, retailers, caterers, input material suppliers and private laboratories.

=== Hong Kong ===
In Hong Kong SAR, the Food and Environmental Hygiene Department is in charge of ensuring food sold is safe and fit for consumption.

=== Hungary ===
In Hungary, the National Food Chain Safety Office controls the food business operators including agricultural producers, food processors, retailers, caterers, input material suppliers and private laboratories. Its activities also cover risk assessment, risk communication and related research.

=== India ===
Food Safety and Standards Authority of India, established under the Food Safety and Standards Act, 2006, is the regulating body related to food safety and laying down of standards of food in India. Hence, it regulates the manufacture, storage, distribution, sale, and import of food articles, while also establishing strict standards to ensure food safety.

=== Japan ===
To ensure the safety of imported foods and related products, Article 27 of the Food Sanitation Act obliges importers to submit import notification. As Article 27 of the Food Sanitation Act states that "Those who wish to import food, food additives, apparatuses, or container/packages for sale or for use in business, shall notify the Minister of Health, Labour, and Welfare on each occasion as prescribed by the Ministerial Ordinance," the imported foods and related products must not be used for sale without import notification.

=== New Zealand ===
The New Zealand Food Safety Authority (NZFSA), or Te Pou Oranga Kai O Aotearoa is the New Zealand government body responsible for food safety. NZFSA is also the controlling authority for imports and exports of food and food-related products. The NZFSA as of 2012 is now a division of the Ministry for Primary Industries and is no longer its own organization.

=== Pakistan ===
The Pure Food Ordinance 1960 consolidates and amends the law in relation to the preparation and the sale of foods. Its aim is to ensure purity of food being supplied to people in the market and, therefore, provides for preventing adulteration.

Pakistan Hotels and Restaurant Act, 1976 applies to all hotels and restaurants in Pakistan and seeks to control and regulate the standard of service(s) by hotels and restaurants. In addition to other provisions, under section 22(2), the sale of food or beverages that are contaminated, not prepared hygienically or served in utensils that are not hygienic or clean is an offense.

=== South Korea ===
==== Ministry of Food and Drug Safety ====
The Ministry of Food and Drug Safety has been working for food safety since 1945. It is part of the Government of South Korea.

IOAS-Organic Certification Bodies Registered in KFDA: "Organic" or related claims can be labelled on food products when organic certificates are considered as valid by KFDA. KFDA admits organic certificates which can be issued by 1) IFOAM (International Federation of Organic Agriculture Movement) accredited certification bodies 2) Government accredited certification bodies – 328 bodies in 29 countries have been registered in KFDA.

Food Import Report: According to Food Import Report, it is supposed to report or register what you import. Competent authority is as follows:

Product	Authority
Imported agricultural products, processed foods, food additives, utensils, containers & packages or health functional foods	MFDS (Ministry of Food and Drug Safety)
Imported livestock, livestock products (including dairy products)	NVRQS (National Veterinary Research and Quarantine Service)
Packaged meat, milk & dairy products (butter, cheese), hamburger patties, meat ball and other processed products which are stipulated by Livestock Sanitation Management Act	NVRQS (National Veterinary Research and Quarantine Service)
Imported marine products; fresh, chilled, frozen, salted, dehydrated, eviscerated marine produce which can be recognized its characteristics	NFIS (National Fisheries Products Quality Inspection Service)

==== National Institute of Food and Drug Safety Evaluation ====
National Institute of Food and Drug Safety Evaluation (NIFDS) is functioning as well. The National Institute of Food and Drug Safety Evaluation is a national organization for toxicological tests and research. Under the Korea Food & Drug Administration, the Institute performs research on toxicology, pharmacology, and risk analysis of foods, drugs, and their additives. The Institute strives primarily to understand important biological triggering mechanisms and improve assessment methods of human exposure, sensitivities, and risk by (1) conducting basic, applied, and policy research that closely examines biologically triggering harmful effects on the regulated products such as foods, food additives, and drugs, and operating the national toxicology program for the toxicological test development and inspection of hazardous chemical substances assessments. The Institute ensures safety by investigation and research on safety by its own researchers, contract research by external academicians and research centers.

=== Taiwan ===
In Taiwan, the Ministry of Health and Welfare in charge of Food and Drug Safety, also evaluate the catering industry to maintenance the food product quality. Currently, US $29.01 million budget is allocated each year for food safety-related efforts.

=== Turkey ===
In Turkey, the Ministry of Agriculture and Forestry, is in charge of food safety and they provide their mission as "to ensure access to safe food and high-quality agricultural products needed by Turkey and world markets" among other responsibilities. The institution itself has research and reference laboratories across the country helping the control and inspection of food safety as well as reviewing and updating the current regulations and laws about food safety constantly.

=== United Kingdom ===
In the UK the Food Standards Agency is an independent government department responsible for food safety and hygiene across the England, Wales and Northern Ireland, while Food Standards Scotland is responsible for Scotland. They work with businesses to help them produce safe food, and with local authorities to enforce food safety regulations. In 2006 food hygiene legislation changed and new requirements came into force. The main requirement resulting from this change is that anyone who owns or run a food business in the UK must have a documented Food Safety Management System, which is based on the principles of Hazard Analysis Critical Control Point. Furthermore, according to UK legislation, food handlers and their supervisors must be adequately trained in food safety. Although food handlers are not legally obliged to hold a certificate they must be able to demonstrate to a health officer that they received training on the job, have prior experience, and have completed self-study. In practice, the self-study component is covered via a food hygiene and safety certificate. Common occupations which fall under this obligation are Nannys, childminders, teachers, food manufacturers, chefs, cooks and catering staff.

In early 2019, as part of US-UK negotiations to arrive at a trade deal prior to Brexit, the Trump administration asked the UK to eliminate its existing ban on chlorinated chicken, genetically modified plants and hormone-injected beef, products that the US would like to sell in the UK.

=== United States ===
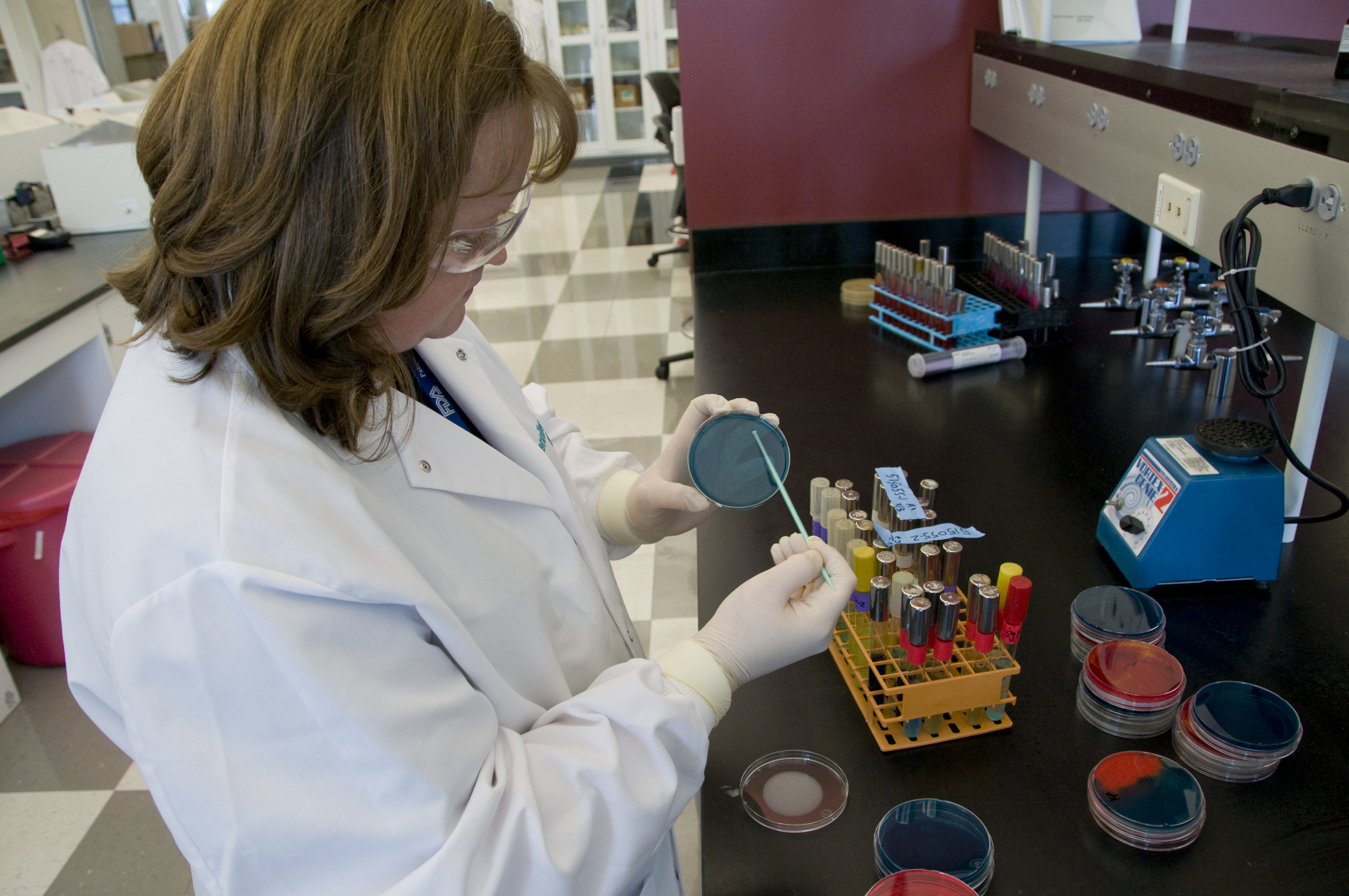
US FDA scientist tests for Salmonella.

The US food system is regulated by numerous federal, state and local officials. Since 1906 tremendous progress has been made in producing safer foods as can be seen in the section below. Still, it has been criticized as lacking in "organization, regulatory tools, and not addressing food borne illness".

==== Federal level regulation ====
The Food and Drug Administration (FDA) publishes the Food Code, a model set of guidelines and procedures that assists food control jurisdictions by providing a scientifically sound technical and legal basis for regulating the retail and food service industries, including restaurants, grocery stores and institutional food service providers such as nursing homes. Regulatory agencies at all levels of government in the United States use the FDA Food Code to develop or update food safety rules in their jurisdictions that are consistent with national food regulatory policy. According to the FDA, 48 of 56 states and territories, representing 79% of the US population, have adopted food codes patterned after one of the five versions of the Food Code, beginning with the 1993 edition.

In the United States, federal regulations governing food safety are fragmented and complicated, according to a February 2007 report from the Government Accountability Office. There are 15 agencies sharing oversight responsibilities in the food safety system, although the two primary agencies are the US Department of Agriculture (USDA) Food Safety and Inspection Service (FSIS), which is responsible for the safety of meat, poultry, and processed egg products, and the FDA, which is responsible for virtually all other foods.

The Food Safety and Inspection Service has approximately 7,800 inspection program personnel working in nearly 6,200 federally inspected meat, poultry and processed egg establishments. FSIS is charged with administering and enforcing the Federal Meat Inspection Act, the Poultry Products Inspection Act, the Egg Products Inspection Act, portions of the Agricultural Marketing Act, the Humane Slaughter Act, and the regulations that implement these laws. FSIS inspection program personnel inspect every animal before slaughter, and each carcass after slaughter to ensure public health requirements are met. In fiscal year (FY) 2008, this included about 50 billion pounds of livestock carcasses, about 59 billion pounds of poultry carcasses, and about 4.3 billion pounds of processed egg products. At US borders, they also inspected 3.3 billion pounds of imported meat and poultry products.

==== US legislation history ====
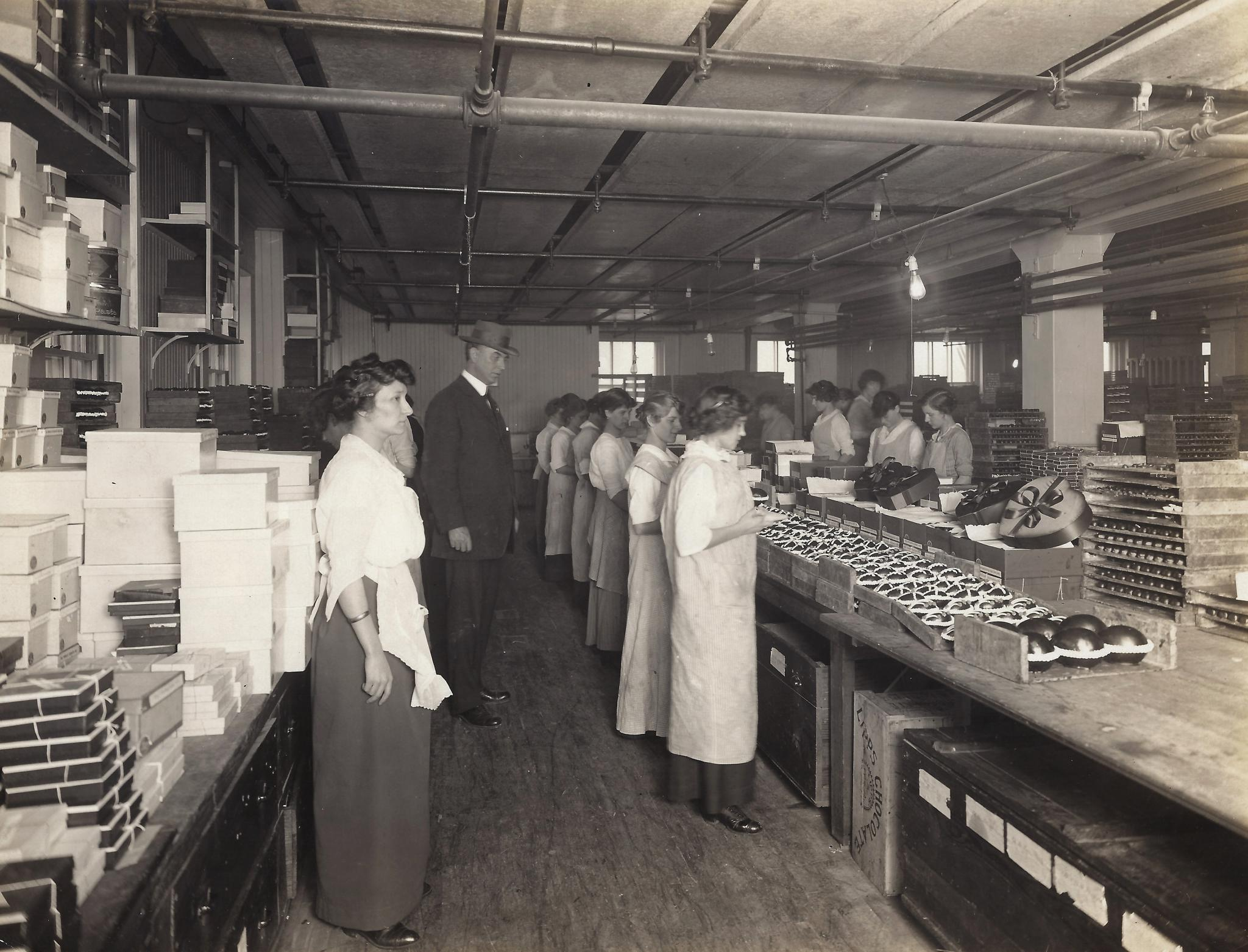
FDA official inspecting a candy factory c. 1911

Recognition of food safety issues and attempts to address them began after Upton Sinclair published the novel The Jungle in 1906. It was a fictional account of the lives of immigrants in the industrial cities in the US around this time. Sinclair spent nine months undercover as an employee in a Chicago meat plant doing research. The book inadvertently raised public concern about food safety and sanitization of the Chicago meat packing industry. Upon reading The Jungle, President Theodore Roosevelt called on Congress to pass the Pure Food and Drug Act and the Federal Meat Inspection Act (FMIA), which passed in 1906 and 1907 respectively. These laws were the first to address food safety in the US, misbranding and adulteration were defined as they concerned food additives and truth in labeling. Food preservatives such as formaldehyde and borax used to disguise unsanitary production processes were also addressed.

The first test and major court battle involving the Pure Food and Drug Act was United States v. Forty Barrels and Twenty Kegs of Coca-Cola, an attempt to outlaw Coca-Cola due to its excessive caffeine content. The Meat Inspection Act led to the formation of the Food and Drug Administration (FDA). Between 1906 and 1938, acts were created that monitored food coloration additives, and other chemical additives such as preservatives, as well as food labeling and food marketing.

During the winter of 1924–1925, the worst food-borne illness to date in the US occurred because of improper handling of oysters. This produced a typhoid fever epidemic, and food-borne illness outbreaks gained national attention. Unfortunately, it was not until 1969 that the FDA began sanitization programs specifically for shellfish and milk, and began its focus and implementation on the food service industry as a whole.

In 1970 the Centers for Disease Control and Prevention (CDC) began keeping records on food-borne illness deaths. This was the beginning of effective record keeping that could be used to control and prevent similar outbreaks in the future. The first major food recall in the US was caused by canned mushrooms in 1973. This outbreak of botulism produced the National Botulism Surveillance System. This system collected the data on all confirmed cases of botulism in the US This led to processing regulations for low-acid foods to ensure proper heat treating of canned foods. The Jack in the Box E. coli outbreak of 1993 led the Clinton administration to put $43 million into the Food Safety Initiative to create many of the common specific regulations in place today. This initiative produced regulations on seafood, meat, poultry, and shell-eggs. This initiative produced a program for DNA fingerprinting to help track outbreaks and to determine their source. It also called for a cooperative detection and response effort between the CDC, FDA, USDA and local agencies called FoodNet.

In 2011 the Food Safety Modernization Act (FSMA) produced what is considered the most significant food safety legislation in over 70 years. The significant difference between this and previous acts was that it shifted to focus from response and containment of food-borne disease outbreaks to their prevention. This act is still in the early implementation phase but gives the FDA authority to regulate the way foods are grown, processed, and harvested.

Under Hazard Analysis and Critical Control Point (HACCP) guidelines, meat and poultry manufacturers are required to have an HACCP plan in accordance with 9 CFR part 417, juice manufacturers are required to have an HACCP plan in accordance with 21 CFR part 120, and seafood manufacturers are required to have an HACCP plan in accordance with 21 CFR part 123.

===== Industry pressure =====
There have been concerns over the efficacy of safety practices and food industry pressure on US regulators. A study reported by Reuters found that "the food industry is jeopardizing US public health by withholding information from food safety investigators or pressuring regulators to withdraw or alter policy designed to protect consumers". A 2010 survey found that 25% of US government inspectors and scientists surveyed had experienced during the past year corporate interests forcing their food safety agency to withdraw or to modify agency policy or action that protects consumers. Scientists observed that management undercuts field inspectors who stand up for food safety against industry pressure. According to Dr. Dean Wyatt, a USDA veterinarian who oversees federal slaughterhouse inspectors, "Upper level management does not adequately support field inspectors and the actions they take to protect the food supply. Not only is there lack of support, but there's outright obstruction, retaliation and abuse of power." A growing number of food and beverage manufacturers are improving food safety standards by incorporating a food safety management system which automates all steps in the food quality management process.

==== State and local regulation ====
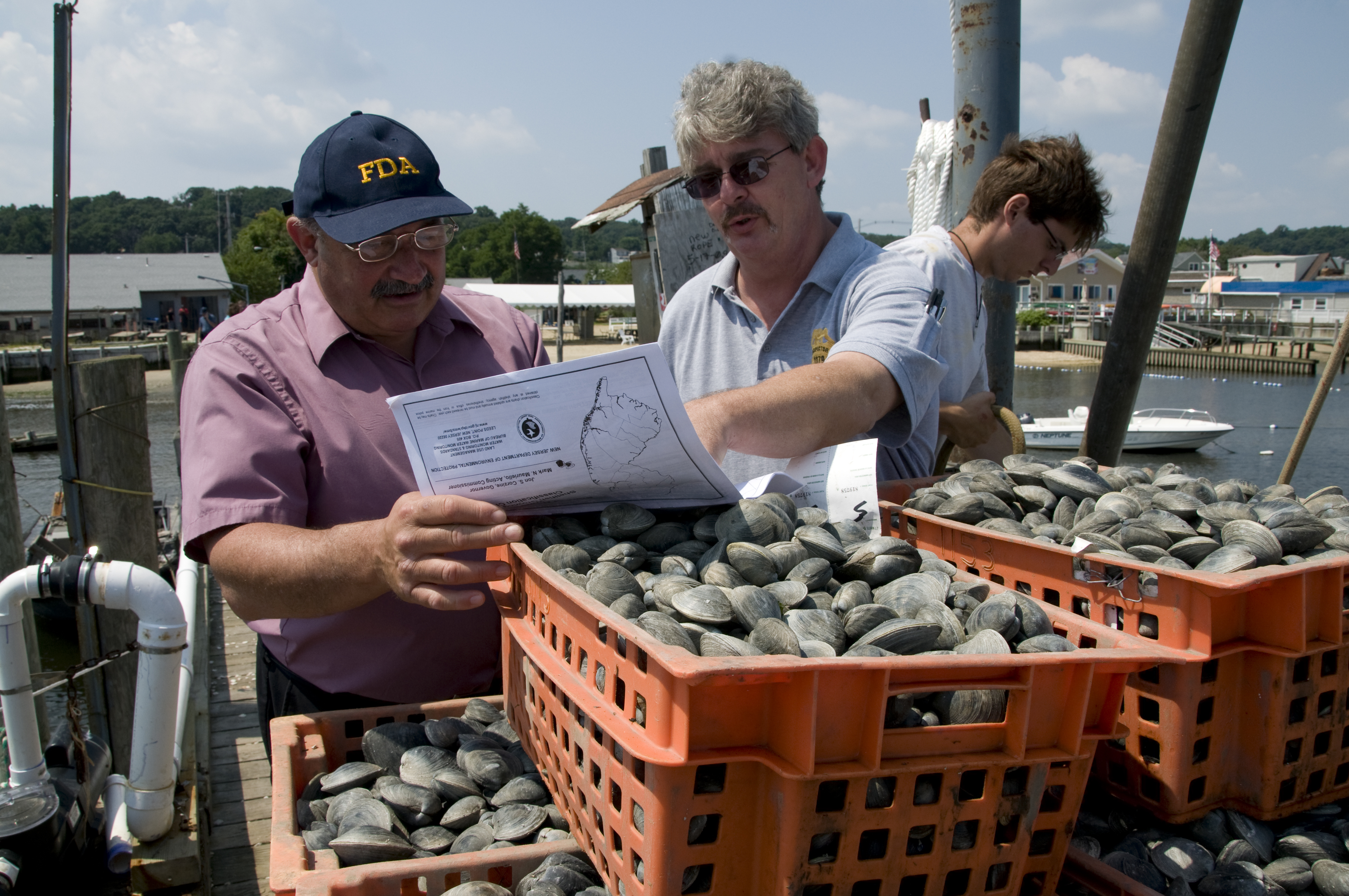
FDA official and New Jersey state inspector review harvest of clams.

A number of US states have their own meat inspection programs that substitute for USDA inspection for meats that are sold only in-state. Certain state programs have been criticized for undue leniency to bad practices. Contrastingly, there are some state-level programs that supplement Federal inspections rather than replacing them. These programs generally operate with the goal of increasing consumer confidence in their state's produce, play a role in investigating outbreaks of food-borne disease bacteria such as in the 2006 outbreak of pathogenic Escherichia coli O157:H7 and in promoting better food processing practices to eliminate food-borne threats. Additionally, several states which are major producers of fresh fruits and vegetables (including California, Arizona and Florida) have their own state programs to test produce for pesticide residues.

The food system represents one of the most significant components of the U.S. economy. It affects the social and economic well-being of nearly all Americans and plays a significant role in the well-being of the global community. The U.S. food and fiber system accounted for 18 percent of employment 4 percent of imported goods, and 11 percent of exports in 2011. The relative economic contribution of each various step of the U.S. food supply chain has changed significantly over the past 100 years. Generally speaking, the economic importance of the farm production subsector has steadily diminished relative to the shares of the other components of the food supply chain.

Restaurants and other retail food establishments fall under state law and are regulated by state or local health departments. Typically these regulations require official inspections of specific design features, best food-handling practices, and certification of food handlers. In some places a letter grade or numerical score must be prominently posted following each inspection. In some localities, inspection deficiencies and remedial action are posted on the Internet. In addition, states may maintain and enforce their own model of the FDA Food Code. For example, California maintains the California Retail Food Code (CalCode), which is part of the Health and Safety Code and is based on most current and safe food handling practices in the retail industry.

It has been argued that restaurant hygiene ratings, though useful at times, are not informative enough for consumers.

=== Vietnam ===
The Vietnam Food Administration manages food hygiene, safety, and quality and has made significant progress since its establishment in 1999. Food safety remains a high priority in Vietnam with the growth of export markets and increasing food imports raising the need to rapidly build capacity of the Food Administration to reduce threats of foodborne disease. The Food Administration has demonstrated commitment to the food safety challenges it faces, and has embarked on an innovative capacity building activity with technical assistance from the WHO.

== Consumer labeling ==
=== United States ===
With the exception of infant formula and baby foods which must be withdrawn by their expiration date, Federal law does not require expiration dates. For all other foods, except dairy products in some states, freshness dating is strictly voluntary on the part of manufacturers. In response to consumer demand, perishable foods are typically labelled with a 'SELL BY' date. It is up to the consumer to decide how long after the 'SELL BY' date a package is usable. Other common dating statements are 'BEST IF USED BY' date, 'USE BY' date, 'EXPIRES/EXPIRATION' date, 'GUARANTEED FRESH' date, and 'PACKED/PACKED ON' dating. When used, freshness dating must be validated using AOAC International (Association of Official Analytical Collaboration International) guidelines. Although this dating requires product testing throughout the entire time frame, accelerated shelf life testing, using elevated temperatures and humidity, can be used to determine shelf life before the long-term results can be completed.

In the United States a study showed that most adults, over the age of 18, did not fully understand what the terms "BEST BY", "SELL BY" or "USE BY" meant. Over the years this had led to billions of pounds of food being discarded prematurely. The primary reason the prevention of foodborne illness, which affects 48 million people annually in the United States. With lack of federal regulation, and standardization of date labeling those from low socioeconomic backgrounds showed to be most affected, often lacking the tools and awareness to safely handle and store food.

The Natural Resource Defense Council and Harvard University Food Law and Clinic Policy have both stated the importance of food date regulation needing to be standardized so consumers are able to make more informed decision on food safety. Most of the packaging dates from the manufacturer are intended for store use, to reflect when an item is at peak quality, not to inform consumers when food is no longer safe to eat. A study conducted in 2019 found that 86% of adults discarded food near the packaging date occasionally. Over a third of the participants also believed that date labeling is federally regulated. The results also showed that adults ranging from 18–34 more frequently misunderstood and relied on the date labeling when deciding to discard food, showing that consumer education is needed for adults in this range. Families from low socioeconomic backgrounds have been shown to have less knowledge about food safety. With food security being an issues for millions of americans it is important for such individuals to be educated on food safety practices.

=== Australia and New Zealand ===
Guide to Food Labelling and Other Information Requirements: This guide provides background information on the general labelling requirements in the Code. The information in this guide applies both to food for retail sale and to food for catering purposes. Foods for catering purposes means those foods for use in restaurants, canteens, schools, caterers or self-catering institutions, where food is offered for immediate consumption. Labelling and information requirements in the new Code apply both to food sold or prepared for sale in Australia and New Zealand and food imported into Australia and New Zealand.

Warning and Advisory Declarations, Ingredient Labelling, Date Marking, Nutrition Information Requirements, Legibility Requirements for Food Labels, Percentage Labelling, Information Requirements for Foods Exempt from Bearing a Label.

== Food recall ==
Food recalls are typically initiated by the manufacturer, distributor of the product, or by a government agency responsible for food safety. Once a safety or quality concern with food products that are already on the market has been recognized, a recall is issued to prevent further damage to the public.

The batch number tracking technique is one of the methods which can be used by manufacturers to recall contaminated food products. In 2015, 19 people in the US suffered food poisoning caused by E. coli O157:H7 after consuming Costco rotisserie chicken salad. Health officials issued a recall on all the uneaten salads with batch number 37719.

== See also ==
- Adulterated food
- Aseptic processing
- Biosecurity
- Codex Alimentarius
- Food microbiology
- Food packaging
- Food spoilage
- Food technology
- Global Food Safety Initiative
- Infant food safety
- Hazard analysis and critical control points
