= Ministry of Agriculture and Forestry (New Zealand) =

Former New Zealand ministry

- Te Manatu Ahuwhenua, Ngāherehere
- Ministry of Agriculture and Forestry logo

Agency overview
- Jurisdiction: New Zealand

The Ministry of Agriculture and Forestry (in Māori, Te Manatu Ahuwhenua, Ngāherehere) was a state sector organisation of New Zealand which dealt with matters relating to agriculture, forestry and biosecurity. It was commonly known by its acronym "MAF".

In April 2012, it became part of the newly formed Ministry for Primary Industries.

== History ==
The New Zealand Ministry of Agriculture and Forestry was formerly known as the Ministry of Agriculture and Fisheries, but in 1995 responsibilities for fisheries were passed to the newly formed Ministry of Fisheries. However, the government of New Zealand decided that, despite the loss of Fisheries, the newly created Ministry of Agriculture should continue to be known by the acronym "MAF", and should still use the same logo, because of the high recognition and regard for the name and logo amongst the country's overseas trading partners. In 1998, this Ministry of Agriculture and the Ministry of Forestry merged to become the Ministry of Agriculture and Forestry.

On 1 July 2010, the Food Safety Authority and MAF were amalgamated, and on 1 July 2011 the Ministry of Fisheries was also merged into MAF. MAF in turn merged with the New Zealand Food Safety Authority in April 2012 to form the Ministry for Primary Industries. The name change proved problematic however, with New Zealand shipments of meat prevented from entering the lucrative Chinese market due to incorrect documentation.

The Sixth Labour government announced it would break up MPI and re-established the separate portfolios of Minister of Agriculture, Minister for Biosecurity and Minister of Forestry. However, MPI was not disestablished; instead, it was restructured with Biosecurity New Zealand and Forestry New Zealand established as new business groups within the larger agency, alongside an agriculture and investment services unit.

== Responsibilities ==
The ministry was responsible for biosecurity, managing New Zealand's state forests, supporting rural communities, ensuring the humane and responsible use of animals, and helping win access to overseas markets for New Zealand products. It also worked to promote sustainability in the New Zealand rural sector, and managed land, water and irrigation in rural New Zealand.

== See also ==
- Agriculture in New Zealand
- Biosecurity in New Zealand
- Forestry in New Zealand
