= Ministry for Primary Industries =

Government ministry of New Zealand

- Māori: Manatū Ahu Matua

Ministry overview
- Formed: 30 April 2012
- Preceding agencies: Ministry of Agriculture and Forestry; Ministry of Fisheries; New Zealand Food Safety Authority
- Jurisdiction: New Zealand
- Headquarters: Charles Fergusson Building; 34–38 Bowen Street; Pipitea; Wellington; WELLINGTON 6011
- Annual budget: Total budgets for 2019/20; Vote Agriculture, Biosecurity, Fisheries and Food Safety ▼$848,779,000; Vote Forestry ▲$277,099,000
- Ministers responsible: Todd McClay, Agriculture, Forestry; Andrew Hoggard, Biosecurity, Food Safety; Shane Jones, Oceans and Fisheries; Mark Patterson, Rural Communities
- Ministry executive: Ray Smith, Director-General
- Child agencies: Agriculture & Investment Services; Biosecurity New Zealand; Fisheries New Zealand; New Zealand Food Safety; Te Uru Rākau (Māori for 'Forestry New Zealand')

The Ministry for Primary Industries (MPI; Māori: Manatū Ahu Matua) is the public service department of New Zealand charged with overseeing, managing and regulating the farming, fishing, food, animal welfare, biosecurity, and forestry sectors of New Zealand's primary industries.

== History ==
MPI was formed in April 2012 by a merger of the Ministry of Agriculture and Forestry (MAF), the Ministry of Fisheries (MFish), and the New Zealand Food Safety Authority (NZFSA).

At the 2017 general election, the Labour Party campaigned on disestablishing the Ministry and restoring the previous agencies. However, MPI was not disestablished; instead, it was restructured with Fisheries New Zealand, Forestry New Zealand, Biosecurity New Zealand and New Zealand Food Safety established as new business groups within the larger agency, alongside an agriculture and investment services unit.

Te Uru Rākau, the New Zealand Forest Service, was re-established in May 2018 after its 1987 disestablishment. It is based in Rotorua.

In March 2024, the Ministry proposed cutting 384 jobs following a cost-saving directive from the National-led coalition government. In May 2024, the Ministry confirmed that it would be slashing 391 jobs, which amounted to ten percent of its workforce. These included 65 early redundancies, 193 vacant positions and 133 non-frontline roles. Those made redundant would be able to apply for new positions. Following a submission from its Biosecurity NZ unit for the retention of its animal and plant health directorate, 22 jobs were retained.

== Structure ==
The Ministry is structured into ten business units. Each business unit is led by a Deputy Director-General.

- Agriculture and Investment Services
- Biosecurity New Zealand
- China Relations
- Corporate Services
- Fisheries New Zealand
- Māori Partnerships and Investment
- New Zealand Food Safety
- Policy and Trade
- Public Affairs
- Te Uru Rākau (New Zealand Forest Service)

== List of ministers ==
The Ministry serves 6 lead portfolios along with 3 associate ministers for Agriculture.

Officeholder	Portfolio(s)	Other responsibility(ies)
Hon Todd McClay	Minister of Agriculture; Minister of Forestry	
Hon Shane Jones	Minister of Oceans and Fisheries	
Hon Andrew Hoggard	Minister for Biosecurity; Minister for Food Safety	Associate Minister of Agriculture (Animal Welfare, Skills)
Hon Mark Patterson	Minister for Rural Communities	Associate Minister of Agriculture
Nicola Grigg		Associate Minister of Agriculture (Horticulture)

== Minister for Primary Industries ==
A consolidated portfolio, the Minister for Primary Industries, was created ahead of the ministry's formation in December 2011 by merging the agriculture, fisheries, forestry and biosecurity portfolios. Separate portfolios were restored in October 2017. A similar consolidated portfolio, the Minister for Food, Fibre and Biosecurity had previously been in use from August 1998 to December 1999.

Colour key
(for political parties)
National

No.	Name	Portrait	Term of office		Party
1	David Carter		14 December 2011	28 January 2013	Key
2	Nathan Guy		28 January 2013	26 October 2017	Key
2	Nathan Guy		28 January 2013	26 October 2017	English

== See also ==
- Biosecurity in New Zealand
  - National Animal Identification and Tracing
- Regulation of animal research in New Zealand
