= List of food labeling regulations =

Regulations and standards for food labeling

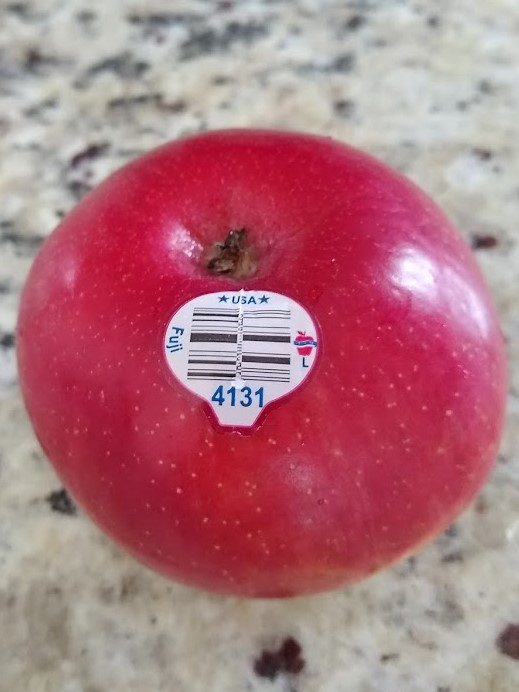
A bar code label on a Fuji apple

The packaging and labeling of food is subject to regulation in most regions/jurisdictions, to prevent false advertising and to promote food safety, and increasingly to provide greater information to consumers relating to quality or lifestyle concerns.

The regulation of food labels has evolved alongside the industrialization of food production and the growth of global mass food markets. In many countries, early food laws focused on preventing adulteration and fraud, often by mandating clear product names and ingredient listings. Over time, governments developed more detailed regulatory frameworks to manage food quality and public health through standardized labeling. Scholars have noted that as food systems scaled up and grew more impersonal, regulators across regions—from Europe and North America to East Asia—began using labels to simulate the trust once derived from local, interpersonal food markets. Labels became instruments of “informational governance,” conveying safety, nutritional value, and even moral or environmental claims. This trend reflects a global shift toward transparency in food commerce, often relying on scientific authority and consumer rights to shape regulatory standards.

== Regulations by type ==
=== Multi-faceted ===
- Codex Alimentarius (international voluntary standard)

=== Ingredients and basic nutrition ===
- Calorie count laws (restaurants)
- Ingredients list
- Nutrition facts label
- [Name & address of manufacturer]
- [Date:]

=== Nutritional rating systems ===
- Nutri-Score
- Traffic light rating system
- Health Star Rating System

=== Veracity ===
- False advertising
- Health claims

=== Food-handling materials ===
The wine glass and fork food safe symbol

- Food safe symbol

=== Specific foods ===
- Olive oil regulation and adulteration
- Food grading labels
- Instructions for Use
- Exp: Date

=== Vegan ===
- "Certified Vegan" by Vegan Awareness Foundation trademark for vegan companies and organizations
- "PETA-Approved Vegan" by PETA for vegan products (clothing and accessory companies), United States, available worldwide
- "Sunflower symbol" by The Vegan Society, United Kingdom trademark for vegan food, available worldwide
- "V-Label" by the European Vegetarian Union, Swiss trademark for vegan items (specified by product), available worldwide
- "Biocyclic Vegan" by BNS Biocyclic Network Services Ltd., Cyprus, for vegan organic production (e.g. vegetable production without manure)

=== Vegetarian ===
- "The green dot symbol" (Vegetarian mark), Indian requirement for food, available worldwide
- "V-Label" by the European Vegetarian Union, Swiss trademark for vegan and vegetarian items (specified by product), available worldwide
- "Vegetarian Society Approved" by the Vegetarian Society, United Kingdom, available worldwide

=== Farming practices ===
- Free range
- Grass fed beef
- Organic certification
- Sustainable agriculture
  - UTZ Certified

=== Religious certifications ===
- Halal (Islamic dietary laws)
- Kashrut (Kosher foods in Jewish law)

=== Controversies ===
- Ag-gag

=== Named geographic origin ===
- Appellation
- Geographical indication
- Country of origin
- Protected Geographical Status (European Union)
- Appellation d'origine contrôlée (France)
- Denominazione di Origine Controllata (Italy)

=== Genetic and commercial origin ===
- Labeling of genetically modified food
- Produce traceability
- Standards of identity for food

=== Preparation at site of consumption ===
- Shake well

=== Pricing ===
- Pay what you want (PWYW)
- Pay what you can (PWYC)
- Dine and dash
- Maximum retail price (MRP)

=== Safety information ===
- Alcohol abuse
- Danger zone (food safety)
- Five-second rule
- Food allergy
- Food intolerance
- Food safety
- Food sampling
- Food spoilage
- International Food Safety Network
- ISO 22000
- Shelf life dates ("Use by" and "Best before")
- Warning label
- Food Allergen Declaration FALCPA

== By region ==
- FAO GM Foods Platform
- Food Administration

=== Asia ===
==== India ====
- Food Safety and Standards Authority of India (FSSAI) — the statutory body established under the Food Safety and Standards Act, 2006, to regulate and supervise food safety in India.

==== Thailand ====
- Phuket: "Yellow flag" for vegetarian food during ‘ngan kin jeh’ vegetarian festival

=== North America ===
==== Canada ====
- Food and Drugs Act
- Monsanto Canada Inc v Schmeiser

==== Mexico ====
- NOM-051-SCFI/SSA1-2010

==== United States ====
- Acceptable Market Name
- Adulteration of Coffee Act 1718
- American Agricultural Law Association
- Dietary exposure assessments in the United States
- Dietary Supplement Health and Education Act of 1994
- Fair Packaging and Labeling Act (US) — enacted in 1966, requiring product identity, manufacturer, and net quantity labeling.
- Nutrition Labeling and Education Act of 1990 — mandated standardized nutrition labeling and regulated health claims on food packages.
- FDA Food Safety Modernization Act
- Federal Food, Drug, and Cosmetic Act
- Federal Meat Inspection Act
- Food and Drug Administration Amendments Act of 2007
- Food and Drug Administration Modernization Act of 1997
- Food libel laws
- Food Quality Protection Act
- Generally recognized as safe
- Global Food Security Act of 2009
- Kevin's Law
- Mandatory country-of-origin labeling of food sold in the United States
- Personal Responsibility in Food Consumption Act
- Public Law 114-214, regulating GMO food labeling
- Pure Food and Drug Act — passed in 1906, it prohibited misbranded or adulterated food and laid the foundation for modern U.S. food law.
- Standards of identity for food
- Title 21 of the Code of Federal Regulations
- United States v. Correll
- United States v. Ninety-Five Barrels Alleged Apple Cider Vinegar

=== Europe ===
==== European Union ====
- Regulation (EC) No. 834/2007 of 28 June 2007 on organic production and labelling of organic products
- Regulation (EU) No 1169/2011 — on the provision of food information to consumers.
- Regulation (EU) No 1151/2012 on quality schemes for agricultural products and foodstuffs: defines "labelling" as "any words, particulars, trade marks, brand name, pictorial matter or symbol relating to a foodstuff and placed on any packaging, document, notice, label, ring or collar accompanying or referring to such foodstuff".

==== United Kingdom ====
- Assize of Bread and Ale
- McLibel case
- The Weights and Measures (Packaged Goods) Regulations 2006

=== Oceania ===
- Food Standards Australia New Zealand

==== New Zealand ====
- Food Act 1981

=== South America ===
==== Brazil ====
- RDC Anvisa 429/2020

==== Chile ====
- Food Labelling and Advertising Law (Law 20.606, 2012) — requires front-of-package warning labels for high sugar, salt, calories, or fat.

== See also ==
- Food and drink prohibitions
- Food safety
- Food security
