= Misconsumption =

Consumption that brings more harm than benefits

Misconsumption also called misuse is consumption that brings harmful results rather than benefits - or that brings more harm than benefits. Products commonly cited as misconsumption include alcohol, cigarettes, and high calorie foods.

== Health ==
MIsconsumption can damage human health, by increasing the rates of chronic diseases such as diabetes, cancer, and heart disease. These diseases account for as much as 85 % of healthcare costs. People who are overweight, or underweight are more likely to undergo problems.

In addition to increasing cancer rates, side-effects of alcohol consumption include road accidents, domestic violence and lost productivity.

== Environment ==
=== Over-fishing ===
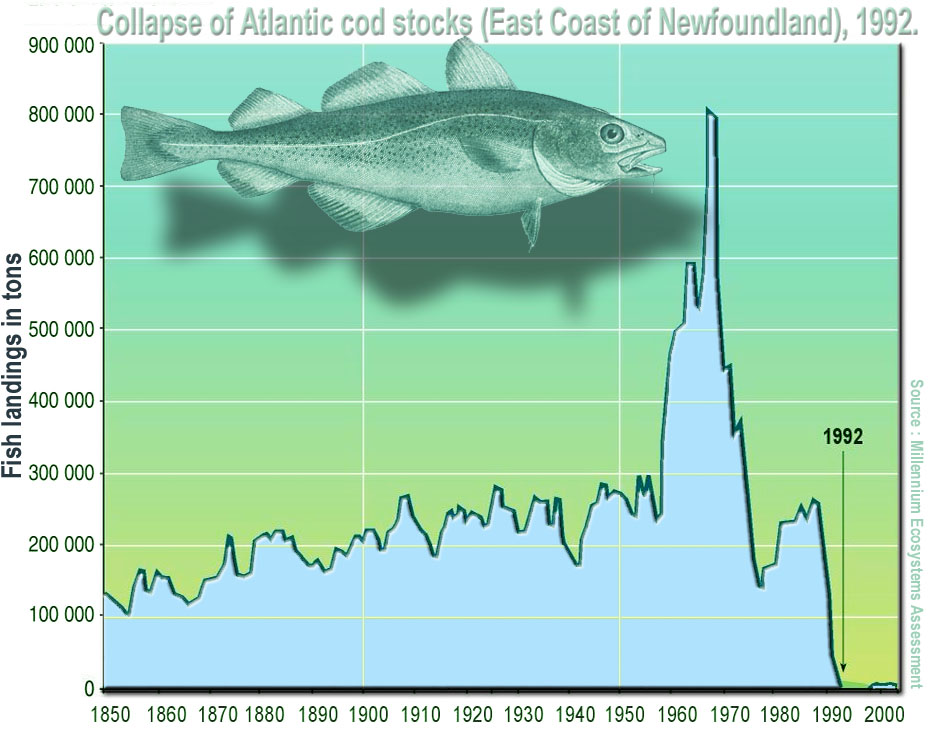

Consumption of marine fish and seafood can drive over-fishing and other poor fishing practices that damage marine environments and deplete fisheries.

=== Travel ===
Overuse of vehicles, and discretionary travel by air and ship generate air pollution, which harms human health and contributes to climate change.

== Policy ==
The European Union estimated that its Common Agricultural Policy resulted in a deadweight loss 13% as of 2008. This resulted from misallocation of resources that transferred benefits from consumers to produces, but with a reduction in total benefits.

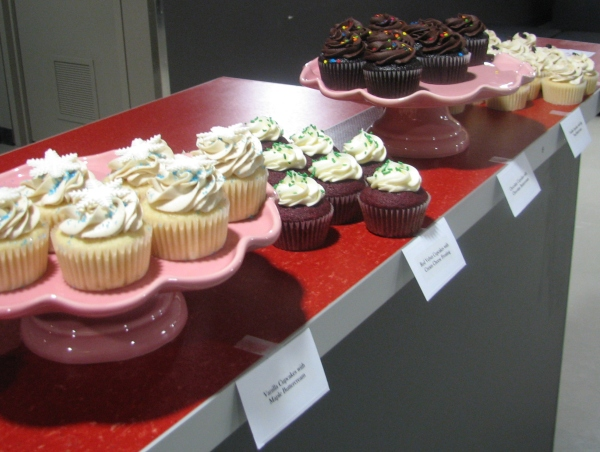
Christmas' typical items tend to be more expensive and elaborate than regular items.

== Responses ==
Responses to avoid the costs include:

- Prohibition (as for drugs or alcohol)
- Prevention (such as Nutriscore)
- Discouraging use or encouraging alternatives (virtuous goods)
- Regulation
- Phase-outs. (such as for older vehicles that do not meet subsequent standards)
- Taxes and fees (sometimes referred to as "sin taxes")
- Favoring or encouraging conservation

== See also ==
- Prohibition
