= Territorial supply constraint =

Alleged economic practice in the EU

Territorial supply constraints (TSCs) are alleged restrictions of parallel trade imposed by some multi-national manufacturers to prevent retailers and wholesalers from sourcing where they wish within the European Single Market.

The definition, terminology, prevalence and effects of such practices remain topics of contention. Critics also note that the debate often overlooks the role of retailers themselves in differentiating stock keeping units (SKUs) for their own private‑label products and varying prices for those products between borders. They point out that private‑label strategies routinely involve tailoring product ranges, packaging, and pricing to local markets—practices that are rarely scrutinised in the same way during TSC discussions.

The only major existing attempt at an EU-wide study on the issue to date, authored by consultancy VVA and published by the European Commission, consists of an often misquoted survey of 34 "large operators" in retail, whom the authors noted "may pose a selection bias". The study concludes that there is "no hard or documentary evidence [...] available" to attest for their existence. A 2022 critical analysis of the study notes how the original authors find the "very same cross-country retail price patterns for both branded manufacturers’ products and retailers’ private label products." As private labels are fully under the control of retailers, it concludes that the study's assumption that "a given part of the variation in wholesale prices observed across Member States is due to the possible existence of [manufacturer imposed] TSCs" is thus "untenable", and that "no policy conclusions" should be drawn from the flawed study.

In 2025, the European Commission included in its Single Market Strategy that it would "develop tools" — falling short of a legislative proposal — to act against "unjustified" territorial supply constraints, citing the 2020 study with a "degree of uncertainty". It neither defined Territorial Supply Constraints, nor the concept of "unjustified TSCs".

== Forms of restrictions ==
Some industry and policy evidence shows that many of the so‑called “restrictions” arise from legal obligations, cost realities, and consumer demand.

National laws in many EU Member States require that product information, safety warnings, and instructions appear in the local language; for example, France’s Toubon Law mandates French‑language labelling. Safety and quality regulations also vary between countries, with certain categories—such as hygiene and food products—subject to national rules that differ from EU‑wide standards. (Note: In 2024, for instance, France introduced specific guidance for tampons reducing the maximum recommended usage time from eight to six hours.)

Environmental and recycling obligations are similarly fragmented, as national recycling systems accept different packaging materials. A package considered “fully recyclable” in one country may not meet recyclability standards in another, necessitating packaging variations. In addition, local labelling schemes such as Nutri‑Score (Note: As an example of a retailer-imposed TSC, in 2021 a leading German retailer introduced the Nutri-Score on all private label products. It demanded that brand manufacturers follow suit: “we expect the food manufacturers to also label their products with the Nutri-Score.”), Triman, Blue Angel, and national organic certifications (e.g., AB in France, AIAB in Italy) impose country‑specific labelling requirements, further contributing to product differentiation.

Consumer preferences also play a significant role in shaping product offerings. Tastes, preferred product formats, scents, and marketing messages vary widely across Member States. (Note: For example, shower gels in France tend to emphasise natural fragrances, whereas Italian consumers prioritise skincare benefits, and in other markets low price is the dominant factor.) These variations mean that the same formulation or packaging is not always commercially viable in every market, even where regulatory conditions are similar.

== Retailer Role in Pricing, Placement, and Product Variation ==
In the EU, retailers set the final retail prices of branded products supplied by manufacturers. Under EU and national competition laws, suppliers cannot fix retail prices, meaning that pricing decisions rest solely with the retailer. This gives retailers considerable influence over price differences between Member States, regardless of wholesale conditions.

Retailers also determine the placement, promotion, and visibility of competing brands in their stores. Decisions on shelf space, in‑store positioning, and promotional activity are made unilaterally by the retailer, often alongside strategic decisions about their own private label products.

Private label products—designed, sourced, and marketed by retailers themselves—also show substantial variation between and within Member States. Retailers adapt product formulations, packaging, and prices to local regulations, consumer preferences, and competitive conditions. These differences demonstrate that variation in product offerings and pricing is not limited to branded goods, and that retailers’ own commercial strategies also contribute to the lack of uniformity in the Single Market.

Some industry stakeholders and policymakers have argued that retailer narratives on TSCs understate the role of retail pricing strategies and private label variation in market outcomes. They contend that such narratives can serve, in part, to advance commercial positioning in negotiations between manufacturers and retailers, where profit margins are a central point of competition.

== Alleged effect on the European Single Market ==
Pressure from multi-national manufacturers fragments the European Single Market and can contribute significantly to large wholesale price differences between countries. Demand and prices for some consumer goods differ between member states due to several reasons, such as average income, cultural attitudes, regulation, taxation and tastes. That is why the prices of distributors’ own brands also differ between countries. However, studies have suggested that there is a price difference which cannot be explained and may be due to territorial supply constraints imposed by manufacturers.

The European Commission-led VVA study used an econometrically derived model of a 90% probability that the true amount of consumer savings falls somewhere between €0.5 billion and €28 billion. Critics argue that the estimate is fundamentally flawed due to serious methodological errors. They point out that it rests on the unjustified assumption that, once TSCs are removed, wholesale prices would drop to the level seen in the Member State with the lowest prices. According to these critiques, this initial error is compounded by the use of a misestimated pass-on elasticity to calculate counterfactual retail prices, which further skews the analysis. The final step—multiplying these incorrect retail prices by total consumer spending—results, they claim, in a highly misleading estimate of potential consumer savings.

Critics also caution that the proposed changes could have unintended negative consequences for consumers. They question whether producers will still be able to reduce prices locally—such as when entering a new market—without facing pressure to extend that lower price across the entire European Union. There is further uncertainty regarding the potential impact on prices in lower-cost countries if producers are effectively compelled to adopt a uniform pricing strategy across the EU, with economic theory suggesting that these will rise. Indeed, European Central Bank (ECB) studies looking at retailers' pricing strategies have found that “in the otherwise homogenous and highly integrated border regions", retailers "differentiate prices always and everywhere, also within countries, but they do so most extensively across national borders. Their market power allows them to price discriminate between countries and maximize profits separately on each side.”

The European Commission-led VVA study also confirms the ECB findings via price data collection, that large multinational retailers "applied different prices in different countries for their private label products", a form of price discrimination. Combined with their grouping into large European retail alliances (Note: The European Parliament has repeatedly called into question the operations of such European Retail Alliances, noting they may lead to "anti-competitive, unlawful, or unfair practices, sometimes by circumventing mandatory national laws", and that such practices are "detrimental to all other players in the value chain". Further that "they undermine fair remuneration for farmers and compromise the transition to more environmentally friendly production and manufacturing processes". Such retail alliances take advantage of the EU's current fragmented implementation of the Unfair Trading Practices Directive by engaging in forum shopping between EU member states, or evade EU law altogether by basing themselves in non-EU states..) to improve their bargaining position vis-à-vis brand manufacturers, critics question whether brand manufacturers would generally be capable of “imposing” TSCs on retailers.

In the 2020 report “Towards more efficient and fairer retail services in the internal market for 2020”, the European Commission emphasised the existence of considerable price differences within the Single Market and concludes that the Single Market is still fragmented. Territorial Supply Constraints were also identified as a Single Market Barrier for the retail ecosystem as part of the EU Industrial Strategy.

The General Secretariat of the Benelux region has also investigated Territorial Supply constraints in their report in 2018, concluding that TSCs are found in the retail trade in all Benelux countries. Both micro, small, medium-sized, as well as large companies, are faced with them.

The European Parliament has repeatedly called on the Commission to address territorial supply constraints.

== Competition rules and enforcement ==
TSCs can be addressed in certain circumstances under existing EU competition law. The rules apply where restrictions form part of agreements (contrary to Article 101 of the Treaty on the Functioning of the European Union, TFEU) or where they are implemented by a dominant operator (contrary to Article 102 TFEU). The 2022 Vertical Block Exemption Regulation and its accompanying Guidelines on vertical restraints provide guidance on which types of restrictions in vertical agreements may infringe competition rules.

The European Commission has applied these rules in a small number of enforcement cases. In 2019, AB InBev was fined €200 million for abusing its dominant position in the Belgian beer market by restricting parallel imports of Jupiler beer from the Netherlands into Belgium. In 2024, Mondelēz International was fined €337.5 million for agreements and practices between 2006 and 2019 that restricted cross‑border sales of chocolate, biscuits, and coffee between Member States. Also in 2024, Pierre Cardin and a licensee were fined €5 million for agreements restricting sales into certain countries or to specific customers.

While sometimes described as “territorial supply constraint” cases, manufacturers and some policymakers note that these decisions concern specific breaches of competition law in narrow circumstances. They argue that the cases do not represent the general operation of the Single Market, and that referring to them as evidence of widespread TSCs risks conflating isolated competition infringements with the broader concept of territorial supply practices, most of which are lawful and commercially standard.

== Bibliography ==
- VVA (2020). Study on territorial supply constraints in the EU retail sector: final report. Publications Office of the European Union. doi:10.2873/59256. ISBN 978-92-76-18938-1.
- VVA (2020a). Study on territorial supply constraints in the EU retail sector: executive summary. Publications Office of the European Union. doi:10.2873/325219. ISBN 978-92-76-25394-5.
- Tosini; Heller (December 2022). Study on territorial supply constraints in the EU retail sector: A critical review (PDF). NERA Economic Consulting.
