= Obesity in the Pacific =

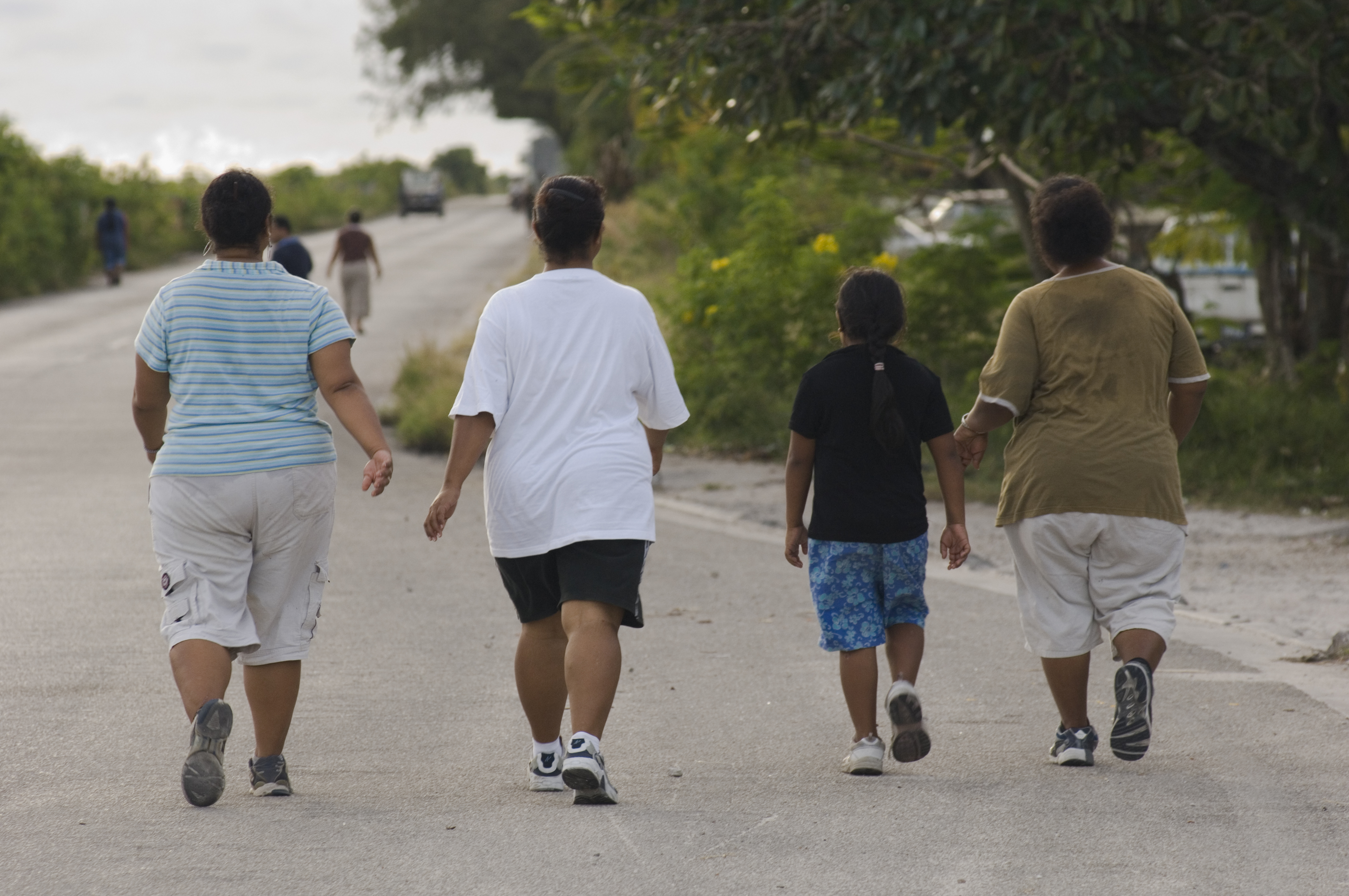
Nauruan residents walking around Nauru International Airport

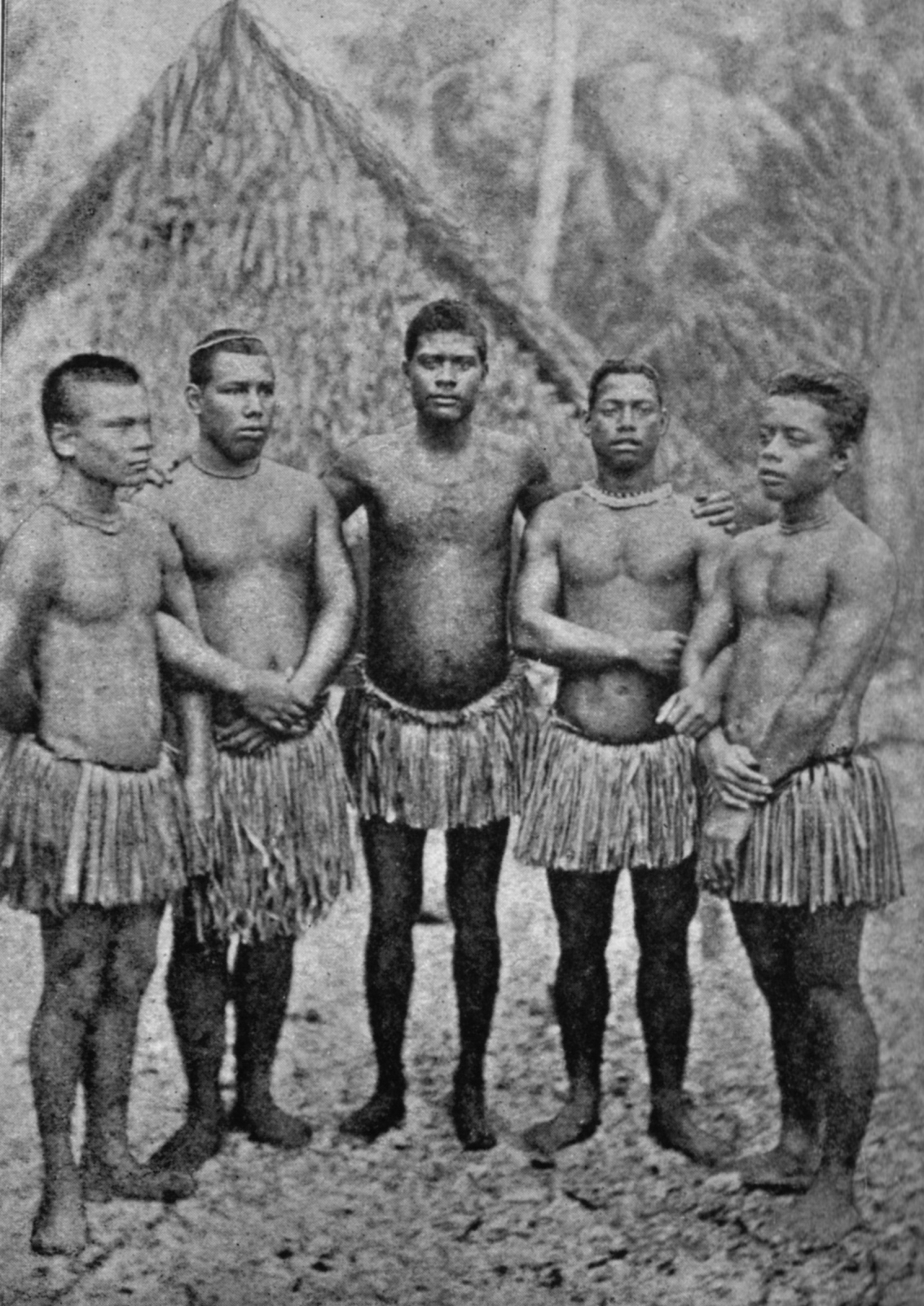
Young Nauruans in 1914

Share of adults that are obese in different countries in Oceania, 1975 to 2016

Pacific island nations make up the top nine on the World Health Organization's list of countries with the most obese populations. In the first eight nations in the list, more than 70% of citizens aged 15 and over are obese:

== Obese populations ==
Rank	Country	% of obese persons
1	American Samoa (USA)	75.8%
2	Cook Islands	72.4%
3	Tonga	72.3%
4	Nauru	71.4%
5	Tokelau (New Zealand)	70.0%
6	Niue	66.2%
7	Tuvalu	64.7%
8	Samoa	63.2%
9	French Polynesia (France)	49.5%
10	Federated States of Micronesia	46.8%
11	Kiribati	45.3%
12	Palau	42.1%

== By nation ==
=== Nauru ===
Obesity is seen as a sign of wealth in Nauru. 31% of Nauruans are diabetic. This rate is as high as 45% among the 55–64-year-old age group.

=== Tonga ===
Life expectancy in Tonga is 71 and has been steadily rising since the 1960s. Up to 40% of the population is said to have type 2 diabetes. Tongan Royal Tāufaʻāhau Tupou IV, who died in 2006, holds the Guinness World Record for being the heaviest-ever monarch— with a weight of 200 kilograms (440 lb).

=== Fiji ===
In Fiji, strokes used to be rare in people under 70. Now, doctors report that they have become common amongst patients in their 20s and 30s. Research done on globalization's impact on health indicates that the rise in average BMI in Fiji correlates with the increase in imports of processed food. Dr Temo K Waqanivalu, a Fijian representative for the WHO, attributes health problems in his country to the replacement of traditional foods by more glamorous imported foods.

=== Marshall Islands ===
In the Marshall Islands in 2008, there were 2000 cases of diabetes out of a population of 53,000. Diabetes prevalence in adults in the Marshall Islands in 2011 was 21.8%. A survey done in the Marshall Islands revealed that the percentage of the total population considered overweight or obese was 62.5%.

=== Cook Islands ===
The Cook Islands comprises fifteen small islands and has a local population of about 10,000 people. In the Cook Islands, meals and feasts exemplify a level of community. Food habits play a role in maintaining social status and hierarchy.

=== Samoa ===
After World War II, the country’s obesity rates skyrocketed. One type of food especially mentioned as a cause for it were "turkey tails" sold to Samoa by the United States. After eating this fatty turkey part for years, Samoa and other Pacific island nations banned the product in their countries due to the rapid increase in obesity, but the bans were forcebly lifted in order for these nations to be allowed to join the World Trade Organization.

The arrival of fast food restaurants and other contemporary food items on the islands are one of the issues responsible for the obesity in Samoa. The earliest photographs of Samoans provide visual proof of the native population's natural physique before the introduction of processed foods by Western society. The natural lifestyle of physically labouring to provide for natural foods and building shelters and communities gave way to modern conveniences like drive through restaurants, motorised vehicles, air travel, wireless communications, and pharmaceutical and recreational drugs. The development of modern society, although advanced with technologies, has also made it easy for many to live an unhealthy lifestyle, therefore leading to obesity.

== Causes ==
=== Colonial history and social change ===
In the early twentieth century, external people visiting the islands such as missionaries and colonial visitors to the Pacific Islands influenced local food habits. In the 1910s, European colonial powers introduced a number of foods to the Nauruans to mitigate impacts of drought and famine and add variety to the Nauruan diet. In the 1920s, the wife of one missionary taught Nauruans to fry fish in a pan rather than eat it raw. Over time, such changes led to loss of skills in fishing and food preservation, causing dependence on foreign foods.

A relatively sedentary lifestyle, including among children, is also contributing to rising obesity rates.

=== Imports of fatty meat byproducts ===
Calories-rich, fat-dense and nutrients-poor food sold by the United States to the Pacific islands has been appointed as one important cause for the rise in obesity levels observed in the Pacific countries in the 20th and 21st centuries. Two types of food especially mentioned as a cause for it were "turkey tails" and spam (canned pork product), sold by the United States to these countries. Much of the local diet as of at least 2008 consists of these imported products, rather than traditional fresh fish, fruit and vegetables.

Restrictions on the sale of such products which had been put or were being considered in the Pacific nations had to be lifted or scrapped in order for these nations to be allowed to join the World Trade Organization.

=== Cultural factors ===
Obesity in the Pacific Islands is also thought to be influenced by social and cultural factors (tambu foods), including past poor public education on diet, exercise and health. Micronutrient deficiencies are also common. Feasting and festivals are major parts of life, imported foods have been given higher social status than local, healthier foods, and historically a large body size was associated with wealth, power and beauty. The Nauru term for satisfaction and feeling healthy, pweda, is the same as fullness or distension.

== Results ==
Obesity is leading to increased levels of illness, including type 2 diabetes and heart diseases and other associated noncommunicable diseases. Maternal obesity has been associated with preterm birth in Palau.

Childhood obesity rates are rising across the region. In 2016, the highest rates of obesity for girls (over 30%) were in Nauru and for boys in the Cook Islands. High rates of obesity appear within 15 months of birth.

== Efforts to treat obesity ==
The World Health Organization implemented various fiscal policies to fight the rise of childhood obesity. Policies include (1) taxation of sugar sweetened beverages (20% SSB Tax) (2) New Marketing on Unhealthy Foods and Beverages to Children (3) International Code of Marketing on Breast Milk Substitutes. Different nations implemented these WHO recommendations to a different extent.

However, such existing public health programs based on nutrition and exercise, solely focusing on the domain of health, have achieved little success. Histories of social values surrounding food and health is often overlooked, and may explain why food habits are hard to change through public health programs.

== See also ==
- List of countries by Body Mass Index (BMI)
- Genetics of obesity
- New World syndrome
- Epidemiology of obesity
