= Food labeling in Mexico =

Official food law

LXI Legislature of the Mexican Congress
- Long title: NOM-051-SCFI/SSA1-2010
- Territorial extent: Nationwide
- Enacted by: Government of Mexico
- Enacted: 2010
- Status: Current legislation

Food labeling in Mexico refers to the official regulations requiring labels on processed foods sold within the country to help consumers make informed purchasing decisions based on nutritional criteria. Approved in 2010 under the Norma Oficial Mexicana (NOM) NOM-051-SCFI/SSA1-2010 (often shortened to NOM-051), the system includes Daily Dietary Guidelines (Spanish abbreviation: GDA). These guidelines focus on the total amounts of saturated fats, fats, sodium, sugars, and energy (kilocalories) per package, the percentage they represent per serving, and their contribution to the daily recommended intake.

After its implementation, several studies assessed the effectiveness of the system. The results indicated that most respondents were unaware of the recommended intake levels, struggled to understand the meaning of the values provided by the system, and did not use the system when shopping. Additionally, most undergraduate nutrition students could not interpret the system correctly when questioned. In response, the Secretariat of Health looked for alternatives to the system. In 2016, Chile introduced a simplified food labeling system featuring black octagonal warning labels, which inspired the creation of a similar system for Mexico.

In 2020, the system was revised and updated with the Food and Beverage Front-of-Package Labeling System (Spanish abbreviation: SEFAB), developed and implemented by the National Institute of Public Health (INSP). By the end of the year, labeling standards were applied to 85% of food products consumed in Mexico, one of the most obese countries in the world. One year after its implementation, studies found the system had an insignificant impact on sales. However, many companies still adjusted their formulas to reduce risk factor levels. Further, the sale of labeled products including images aimed at children or sold in schools is prohibited.

== Development ==
=== Background ===
The influx of foreign food industry capital since the 1980s, coupled with the implementation of the North American Free Trade Agreement (NAFTA) in 1994, led to a sharp rise in the import of processed foods into Mexico. These changes triggered an irreversible shift in the country's eating habits and a dramatic increase in obesity rates. In the 1980s, these rates were just 7%. Since then, Mexico has become the leading consumer of processed foods in Latin America and the fourth-largest worldwide, as of 2017.

=== First front-of-package labeling system ===
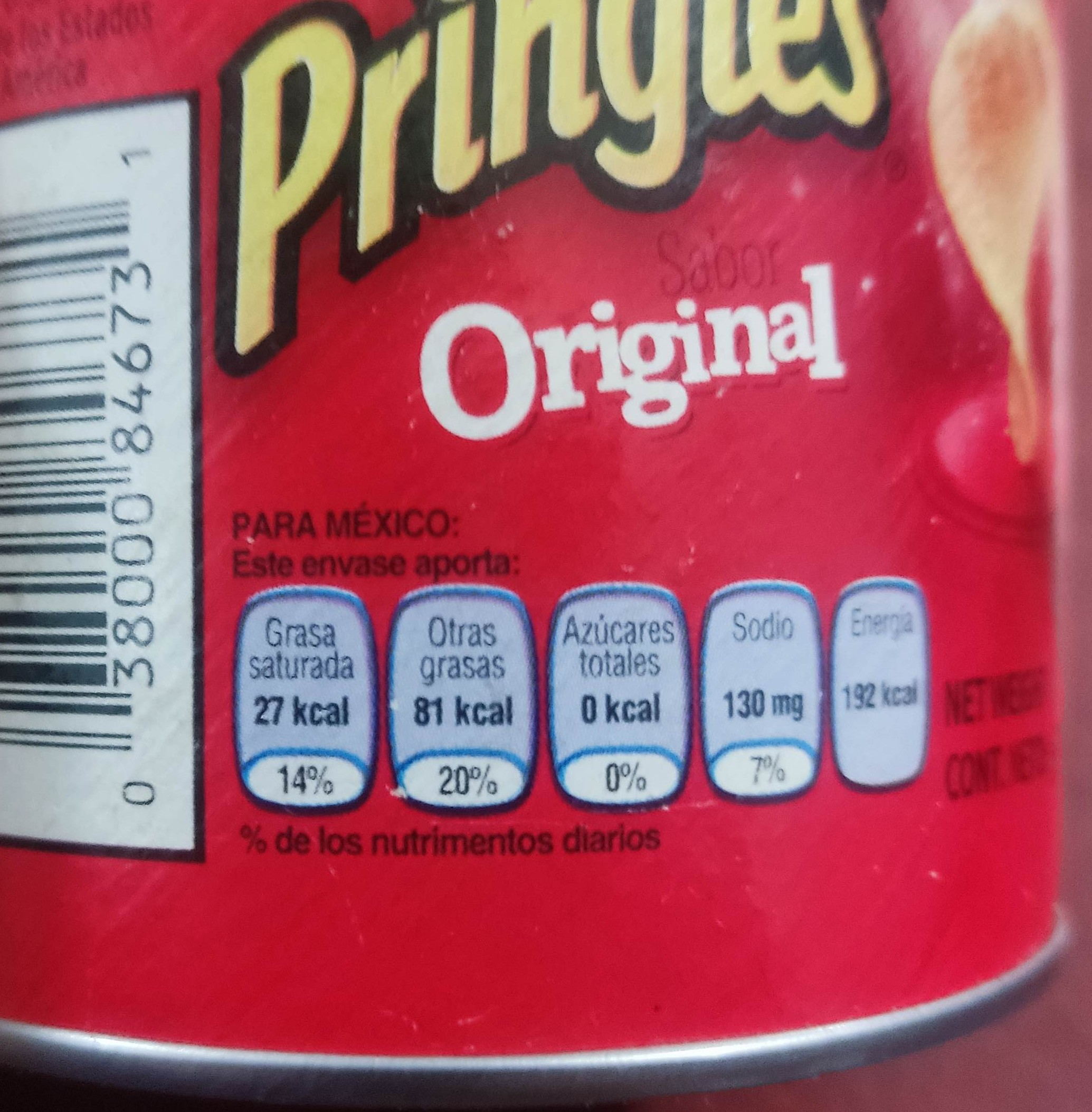
A 37 g (1.3 oz) can of Pringles. The original system informed consumers of the percentage values per package.

In 2010, the Secretariat of Health (SALUD) requested the establishment of a food labeling norm. After its approval, it was designed as NOM-051-SCFI/SSA1-2010 under the Norma Oficial Mexicana (NOM) standards. The system, called Daily Dietary Guidelines (Spanish: Guías Diarias de Alimentación or GDA), was based on the total amount of saturated fats (grasas saturadas), fats (grasas), sodium (sodio), sugars (azúcares) and energy (calorías) represented in kilocalories per package. It also indicated the percentage these amounts represented per serving and their contribution to daily recommended intake.

The National Institute of Public Health (INSP) began investigating the effectiveness of the labeling system in 2011. Their findings showed that it was largely ineffective, as most nutrition students were unable to interpret it correctly. In 2016, the National Health and Nutrition Survey (Spanish: Encuesta Nacional de Salud y Nutrición) included questions about understanding the GDA food labeling system. The results revealed poor comprehension nationwide. The INSP reported that 97.6% of respondents were unaware of the appropriate calorie intake values for children aged 10 to 12, over 90% did not know the recommended daily calorie intake for adults, and 66.4% never used the GDA system to inform their purchases. Additionally, a survey conducted by INSP and the University of Waterloo found that only 6% of adults understood the GDA system.

In 2013, the federal government of Mexico launched the 2013 National Strategy for the Prevention and Control of Overweight, Obesity and Diabetes (Spanish: Estrategia Nacional para la Prevención y el Control del Sobrepeso, la Obesidad y la Diabetes), a set of measures aimed at addressing the obesity crisis and chronic non-communicable diseases such as hypertension, diabetes, and cancer. The strategy highlighted that the current levels of overweight and obesity in Mexico posed a significant threat to the sustainability of the healthcare system, due to their link to non-communicable diseases and the high costs associated with specialized care. Statistics showed that 42.6% of men over 20 were overweight, and 26.8% were obese. Among women, 35.5% were overweight and 37.5% were obese. By 2018, 75% of adults were either overweight or obese.

=== Second front-of-package labeling system ===
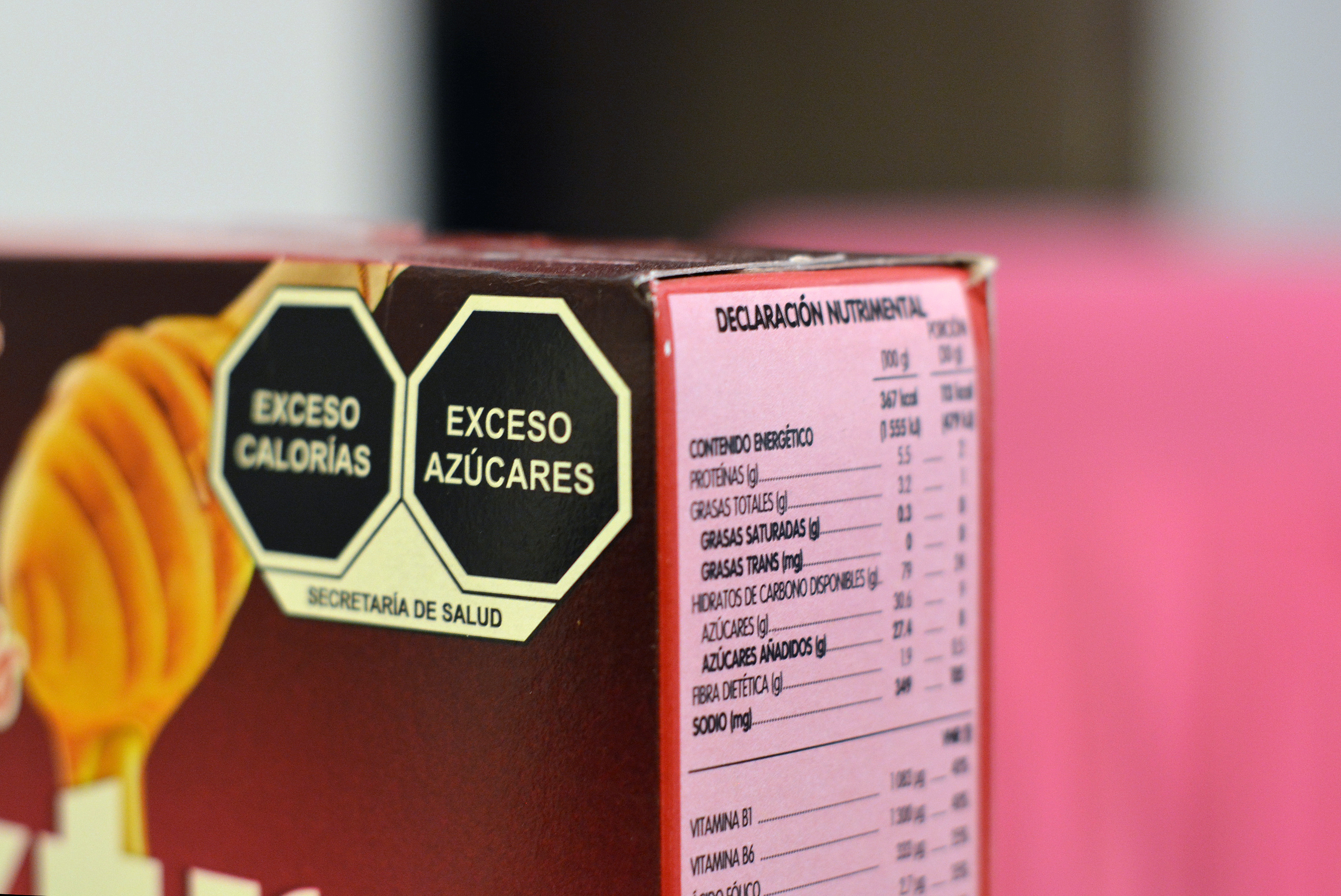
A honey-sweetened box of cereal indicates the product contains excessive amounts of sugars and energy per 100 g (3.5 oz) of product. The nutrition label also shows that the product is barely within the acceptable sodium limits.

In 2016, the government of Chile enacted the Food Labeling and Advertising Law, which introduced simplified and prominent warning labels to indicate excess calories, added nutrients and additives linked to non-communicable diseases. Inspired by this system, the INSP formed a committee of national academic experts to develop a new regulation for front-of-package labeling of food and non-alcoholic beverages. The Secretariat of Economy (SE) and the Federal Commission for the Protection against Sanitary Risk organized working groups, resulting in a draft standard submitted for public consultation, from 11 October to 10 December 2019 gathering 5,200 comments. Simultaneously, civil society organizations, including the Alianza por la Salud Alimentaria (Alliance for Food Health), launched a public campaign to inform the population about these efforts.

On 29 October 2019, reforms and additions to the Mexican General Health Law were approved, including the new front-of-package labeling model. On 27 March 2020, the Official Journal of the Federation published updates to the norm NOM-051-SCFI/SSA1-2010, stipulating that all food and non-alcoholic beverage packaging and containers must display the approved seals.

The law was divided into three phases: the first consisted of the introduction of front-of-pack labeling; the second, which began on 1 June 2021, required companies to comply with additional transparency and protection measures alongside the labeling. The third phase, scheduled for implementation on 1 January 2026, stipulates that complementary information must be incorporated into the provisions outlined in NOM-051. The calculation and evaluation of complementary nutritional information refers to the following: For phases one and two, if added sugars were included to a product, sugars and calories had to be evaluated; if fats were added, saturated fats, trans fats, and calories had to be evaluated; if sodium was added, only sodium had to be evaluated. In contrast, for phase three, if any critical nutrient is added to a product, a full reevaluation of the formula will be conducted.

== Labels ==
The labels implemented are black octagons with white letters, designed to simply inform consumers about high amounts of sugars, energy, trans fats, and saturated fats. Two rectangular warnings were also added, advising against the consumption of products containing caffeine or sweeteners in children. These labels can appear individually or in groups, which will determine whether the product can include certain persuasive elements, such as toys, rewards, or images of mascots, celebrities, fictional characters, or cartoons on the packaging aimed at attracting the attention of minors. Additionally, if the product carries one or more seals, it cannot feature endorsements from medical societies.

Label	Translation	Application parameters
Excess energy warning seal	Excessive calories	When 100 grams (3.5 oz) of food contain 275 kilocalories (1,150 kJ) or more.; When 100 milliliters (3.5 imp fl oz; 3.4 U.S. fl oz) of beverage contain 70 kcal (290 kJ) or more in total, or 10 kcal (42 kJ) of free sugars.
Excess sugar warning seal	Excessive sugar	When 100 g (3.5 oz) or 100 ml (3.5 imp fl oz; 3.4 US fl oz) of product (food or beverage) contains an amount greater than or equal to 10% of the total energy provided by free sugars.
Excess sodium warning seal	Excessive sodium	When 100 g (3.5 oz) of food or 100 ml (3.5 imp fl oz; 3.4 US fl oz) of beverage contain 350 mg (0.012 oz) of sodium or more. For non-caloric beverages, this threshold applies if the sodium content exceeds 45 mg (0.0016 oz)
Excess saturated fats warning seal	Excessive saturated fats	When 100 g (3.5 oz) of food contains 10% or more of the total energy from saturated fats.; When 100 ml (3.5 imp fl oz; 3.4 US fl oz) of a beverage contains 10% or more of the total energy from saturated fats.
Excess trans fats warning seal	Excessive trans fats	When 100 g (3.5 oz) of food or 100 ml (3.5 imp fl oz; 3.4 US fl oz) beverage contains 1% or more trans fats.
Contains sweeteners warning seal	Contains (artificial) sweeteners. Not recommended for children.	If the product (food or beverage) contains sweeteners.
Contains caffeine warning seal	Contains caffeine. Not recommended for children.	If the product (food or beverage) contains caffeine.
A seal indicating that the product has 3 other seals	1/2/3/4/5 labels	It substitutes the aforementioned seals when the package's surface area is smaller than 40 cm^{2} (6.2 sq in).

In addition to the seals, packaging must include nutrition facts labels that specify the exact amount of sugars added during the manufacturing process, as well as the nutritional content expressed in quantities of 100 grams or 100 milliliters.

== Reception ==
=== Companies ===
The governments of the United States, Canada, Switzerland, and the European Union—where the largest multinational food corporations in the world are based—requested through the World Trade Organization that Mexico postpone the implementation of front labeling. They argued that the measures were "more restrictive than necessary to meet Mexico's legitimate health objectives". The Mexican Consumer Products Industry Council (Consejo Mexicano de la Industria de Productos de Consumo), which represents companies based in Mexico, asked the authorities to eliminate the new front labeling, describing it as confusing and unreliable. Companies such as Coca-Cola, PepsiCo, Jugos del Valle and Grupo Bimbo requested the postponement. The latter was able to have some of its products exempted due to its own health strategy. FEMSA, the Coca-Cola producer in Mexico, filed a writ of amparo lawsuit against the labeling of its products. Another amparo lawsuit filed by the National Confederation of Industrial Chambers in March 2020 was dismissed by the Mexican judiciary. The Interamerican Association for the Protection of Intellectual Property and the Mexican Association for the Protection of Intellectual Property stated that food labeling was unconstitutional and violated international agreements Mexico had signed, including the NAFTA. Civil society researchers highlighted the repeated use of this argument in other countries to block new labeling initiatives.

=== Organizations ===
Among the organizations and entities that celebrated the implementation of the labeling were UNICEF, the World Health Organization, the Pan American Health Organization, the National Human Rights Commission of Mexico, the country's leading public universities (including the National Autonomous University of Mexico, the National Polytechnic Institute and the Autonomous Metropolitan University), as well as the Mexican Secretariats of Economy and Health and the System for the Integral Protection of the Rights of Children and Adolescents.

=== Prizes and recognitions ===
The World Health Organization awarded SALUD for its efforts in the Prevention and Control of Non-communicable Diseases due to the front-of-package labeling update.

== Impact ==
=== On population ===
In a survey conducted shortly after the second front-of-package system was officially implemented, Food Navigator found that only 10% of respondents considered the labels. Researchers from the Obesity Data Lab agreed that the COVID-19 pandemic in the country would likely have indirectly affected the results.

In 2020, Guadalupe López Rodríguez, nutritionist and researcher of the Autonomous University of the State of Hidalgo, commented that, if the Chilean system were used as a model, the labels would have a significant impact on the population during the initial stage of implementation. However, over time consumers would become accustomed to them and would cease to give them the desired importance. Cuauhtémoc Rivera, president of the Alianza Nacional de Pequeños Comerciantes (National Alliance of Small Merchants), mentioned that consumers initially avoided products with seals, but purchases returned to normal levels subsequently.

After one year of implementation, it was found that consumption had decreased in some categories, but there was no significant impact on sales. Jonás Murillo, vice president of the Food, Beverages, and Tobacco Commission of the Confederation of Industrial Chambers, explained that consumers tended to prefer larger versions of products with labels over smaller, healthier alternatives. Additionally, it was noted that in some cases, consumers favored products with more labels over unlabeled ones. Murillo also pointed out that the key issue with the system was its incorrect application. As an example, he compared a salad with dressing and a bottle of soft drink, concluding that despite their different nutritional values, both products had the same number of labels.

Since 2025, the sale of labeled products in schools has been prohibited. According to Mexican authorities, 98% of schools nationwide sold junk food before the prohibition. Authorities provided guidelines outlining acceptable products and portion sizes. Additionally, preparing food using labeled products is also not permitted. In 2026, Simón Barquera, president of the World Obesity Federation, said that 60% of people who use the labels as a reference have chosen healthier products. He also noted that child obesity in Mexico stabilized at 13 million cases in children and adolescents between the ages of 5 and 19, causing the country to rank eighth in its global measurement.

=== On companies ===
After its implementation, 85% of the products received a label. Despite inconclusive results, several companies (especially soft drinks and dairy companies) modified the formulas of certain products to reduce the risk levels. In some cases, the total number of labels on products was reduced, while in others, companies opted to sell an alternate version of the same product that was free of labels. Simón Barquera, director of the Center for Research in Nutrition and Health at the INSP, emphasized the importance of limiting corporate involvement in public health matters, as companies often seek ways to undermine such efforts.

== See also ==
- List of food labeling regulations
