= Food labelling and advertising law (Chile) =

Food labeling and advertising law in Chile (2016)

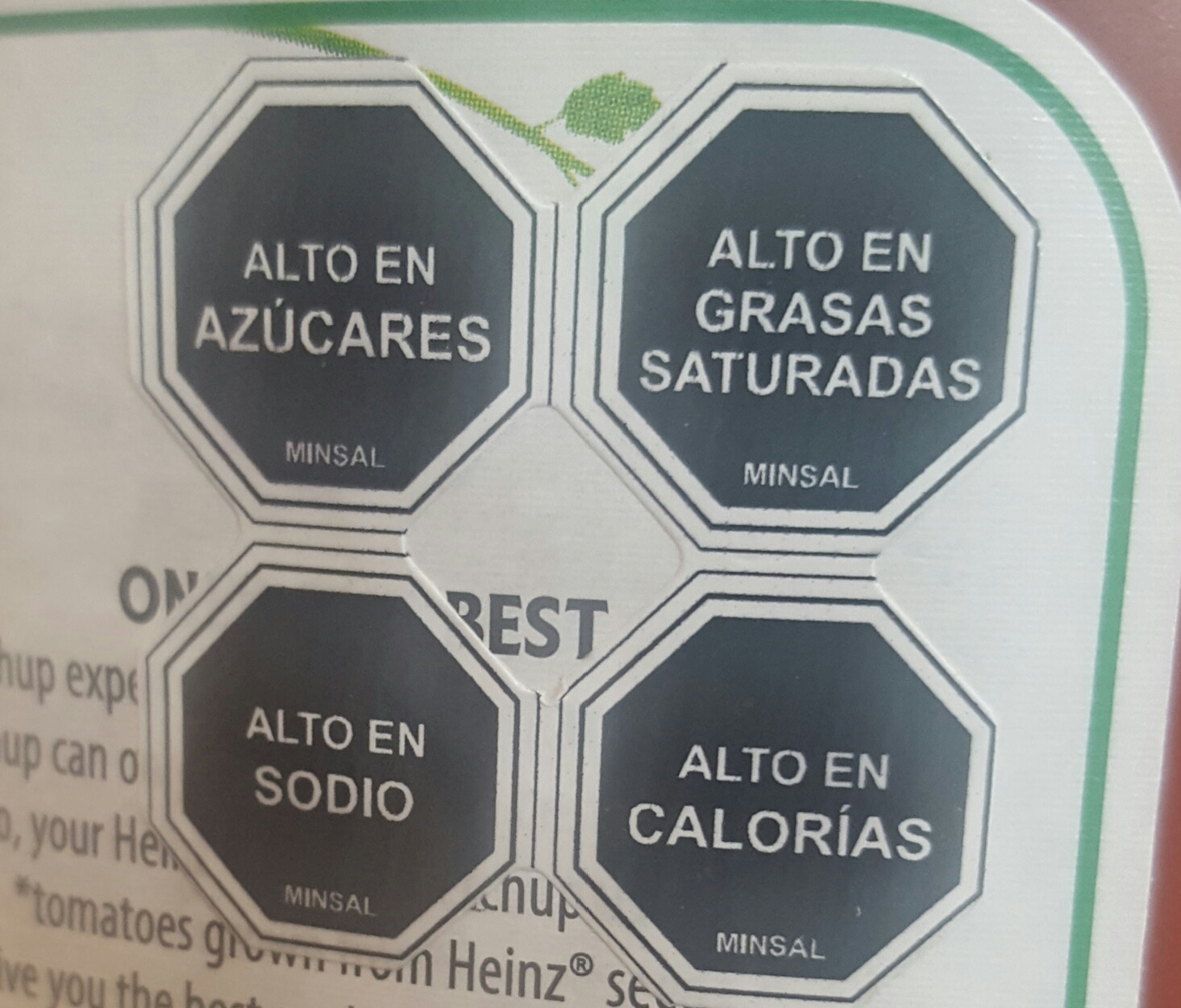
Labels on a ketchup container marketed in Chile, in accordance with Chilean Law 20,606, show that the product is high in sugars, in saturated fats, in sodium and in calories.

Chile's food labelling and advertising law, formally titled Ley 20.606, sobre la composición de los alimentos y su publicidad ("Law 20,606, on the nutritional composition of foods and their advertising") establishes a regulatory framework on food security and healthy food with the intention of guiding consumers towards behaviour patterns that promote public health. After the 2012 law was enacted, its accompanying regulations came into full force on June 27, 2016. Andrew Jacobs, writing for The New York Times, has characterized this measure as "the world's most ambitious attempt to remake a country's food culture" and suggests it "could be a model for how to turn the tide on a global obesity epidemic that researchers say contributes to four million premature deaths a year."

In Chile, the law — often referred to by less cumbersome names such as ley de etiquetado de alimentos ("food labelling law"), ley del Súper Ocho ("Super Eight law"), (Note: After a chocolate-dipped wafer cookie produced by Nestlé.) or simply ley de alimentos ("food law") — specifically regulates the delivery of nutritional information on foods high in sodium, saturated fats, sugars or calories. The standard also prohibits the sale of such foods in educational institutions, and limits the advertising of these products to children under fourteen.

== History ==
=== Background ===
According to a 2010 national health survey, more than 60 percent of Chile's population suffers from excessive weight. The problem begins early in childhood, with more than 10 percent of children under six, more than 15 percent of preschoolers and more than 25 percent of first-grade children presenting with obesity. When the overweight and the obese children are considered as a group, more than 50 percent of them, according to the Chilean Ministry of Health, are found to suffer from malnutrition, which they consider the main public health problem in the country. Prior to the law's enactment, poor diet and high body mass index were the leading causes of premature death and disability in Chile.

=== History of front-of-package warning label ===
In an effort to combat childhood obesity, the World Health Organization encourages implementing a three-pronged approach to promote health. Their suggestions include mandating front-of-package warning labels (FOPWL), banning marketing of foods with a FOPWL to children, and prohibiting selling these products in schools. In 1993, Finland was the first country to enact a similar law, issuing a front-of-package warning label on sodium-rich products. Chile was the first country to adapt all three recommendations outlined by the WHO.

== Legislation and regulations ==
=== Law 20.606 ===
The law has eleven articles; its stipulations establish:

- The responsibility of manufacturers, importers or producers of food for human consumption to have specific labels on the nature of the product, with full and truthful information, and their responsibility to ensure that good practices guaranteeing food safety are followed in their production chain.
- A duty of manufacturers, producers, distributors and importers of food to inform, on their containers or on their labels, as to the ingredients contained, including all additives and their nutritional information, to follow food health regulations in which the characteristics and content of said food will determine the labelling, and especially to ensure that the information is sufficiently visible and comprehensible.
- A prohibition against adulterating ingredients and prepared foods with anything that in some way may create an erroneous impression regarding their true nature, composition or quality, or that may cause damage to health, as determined by the Ministry of Health.
- A duty of preschool, elementary and secondary schools to include educational materials and exercise in order to promote healthy eating habits and physical activity, and the mandated requirement for the Education and Health ministries to have a nutritional monitoring system for students in preschool, elementary and secondary school.
- The requirement for the Ministry of Health to determine foods whose nutritional composition has high amounts of calories, fats, sugars or salt (or other ingredients, as determined by regulation), setting permitted maximums and ensuring compliance through the public health system.
- A prohibition against commercial sale or distribution in preschool, elementary and secondary schools of food products labelled as high in the regulated nutrients or calories, and against the free delivery or advertising of such products to children under 14, including commercial tie-ins designed to appeal to children, such as toys, accessories, adhesives or similar products.
- A prohibition against labelling infant formulas and breast-milk substitutes in any way that may discourage breastfeeding.
- An obligation that any food product marketed in Chile that contains among its ingredients — or that has used, in the course of its preparation — potential allergens like soy, milk, peanuts, eggs, seafood, fish, gluten or nuts must indicate this on its package or label.

=== Regulatory regime ===
Health ministry decree No. 13 (April 16, 2015), amended the government's processed foods regulation to adapt it to the provisions of Law 20.606 and specifying maximum calories, sodium, sugars and saturated fats in food; the values were set to diminish by progressive stages after the regulation's entry into force. The limits stipulated by law are:

	Energy	Sodium	Sugars	Saturated fats
Limits on solid foods	350 kcal/100g^{(from 26 June 2016)} 300 kcal/100g^{(from 26 June 2018)} 275 kcal/100g^{(from 26 June 2019)}	800 mg/100g^{(from 26 June 2016)} 500 mg/100g^{(from 26 June 2018)} 400 mg/100g^{(from 26 June 2019)}	22.5 g/100g^{(from 26 June 2016)} 15 g/100g^{(from 26 June 2018)} 10 g/100g^{(from 26 June 2019)}	6 g/100g^{(from 26 June 2016)} 5 g/100g^{(from 26 June 2018)} 4 g/100g^{(from 26 June 2019)}
Limits on liquid foods	100 kcal/100ml^{(from 26 June 2016)} 80 kcal/100ml^{(from 26 June 2018)} 70 kcal/100ml^{(from 26 June 2019)}	100 mg/100ml^{(from 26 June 2016)}	6 g/100ml^{(from 26 June 2016)} 5 g/100ml^{(from 26 June 2018)}	3 g/100ml^{(from 26 June 2016)}

The regulation also detailed the foods that are exempted from the labelling obligation, which includes foods without added sugars, honey or syrups; without added sodium and without saturated fats; those sold in bulk or portioned out, divided and prepared at the request of the public (even if they are packaged at the time of sale); infant formula; commercially prepared minced baby food, unless they contain added sugar; food prepared for medical use; food for weight control regimens; dietary supplements and certain foods for athletes; and table-top sugar substitutes.

=== Pillars of the law ===
1. Labels which exceed the recommended amounts, including being high in salt, sugar, sodium or saturated fat, must be displayed on the front of the package as being "high in" that particular nutrient.
2. Schools are prohibited from selling any food that has such a front-of-package warning label.
3. These products cannot be advertised to children under the age of 14 through any media channels, nor can they utilize marketing tactics that appeal to children — such as school appeals and endorsements by celebrities and figures relevant to that demographic.

== Compliance and impact ==
=== International impact ===
Several countries have expressed interest in the Chilean standards and have considered their content in developing their own countries' labelling regulations, including Argentina, Australia, Brazil, Canada, Colombia, Ecuador, Guatemala, Honduras, Israel, Mexico, New Zealand, Nicaragua, Panama, Peru, El Salvador and Uruguay.

International organizations — including the Caribbean Community (CARICOM), the Pan American Health Organization, the UN's Food and Agriculture Organization and World Health Organization, the Union of South American Nations and the OECD — have expressed support for the Chilean food labelling and advertising law and regulations and have facilitated bilateral cooperation, memoranda of understanding and the establishment of international networks. Codex Alimentarius has urged member countries to revise regulations on labelling, while the World Trade Organization has established international discussion panels on food labelling, at which Chilean representatives have been prominent speakers.

In addition, during North American Free Trade Agreement negotiations, the governments of Mexico and Canada have advocated for nutritional warnings on foods, inspired by the Chilean experience, but from 2017 to 2020, the United States government supported efforts of the commercial food and beverage industry to prevent the adoption of laws similar to Chile's by demanding NAFTA clauses forbidding the enactment of such consumer safety laws in Canada, Mexico and the United States. Lora Verheecke, a researcher at the Corporate Europe Observatory, a non-profit group tracking corporate lobbying, has declared that once such pro-industry and anti-consumer rules are enshrined into international trade agreements, it becomes extremely difficult to overturn them in the laws of trade-pact member states: "It kind of kills a law before it can be written, and once you put it into one trade agreement, it can become the precedent for all future deals with future countries."

=== Impact in purchasing and perception ===
A strong level of awareness exists for Chile's food labelling law. A majority of Chileans were able to state the purpose of the law and its effectiveness, but few were able to address what the guideline daily amount meant. The Lancet compared pre- and post-policy-enactment on food and beverage purchases in Chile. They found calories in purchased foods decreased by 3.5 percent overall. The total amounts of sugar and saturated fats in products decreased by 10.2 and 3.9 percent respectively. The Lancet concluded that the law's enactment resulted in a significant decrease in the purchasing of food with labels "high in" a nutrient. However, a review of the literature from the British Food Journal notes that after the implementation of the first stage, there was no correlation found between the law's enactment and a change in obesity rates. The researchers suggest continued studies after the third law's implementation to discover if there is a statistically significant effect.

The International Journal of Behavioral Nutrition and Physical Activity conducted an analysis of the Chilean law's impact, specifically focusing on mothers with school-aged children. Mothers selected to participate in the focus groups had children between the ages of two and 14. In all focus groups, mothers were aware both of the policy and of its overarching goal to reduce childhood obesity. Some of the mothers reported that the policy has "uncovered" what constitutes healthy food, and has encouraged many of them to change their shopping habits accordingly. Mothers reported mixed results as to how the warning labels have influenced their shopping habits. Some report no impact, while others say they utilize it as a quick shortcut while shopping. Another group reported paying very close attention to the warnings, particularly those of a middle and high socioeconomic status. Further, another study found that 78.5 percent of individuals surveyed reported that the front-of-package warning labels swayed their purchasing decisions, while perception of highly processed foods has encouraged many mothers to purchase higher quantities of natural foods.

== Repercussions in schools ==
In a focus group including mothers with school-aged children, they self-reported that schools have become advocates for healthy eating, replacing unhealthy food with fresh fruits and vegetables. Previous school events centred around eating an unhealthy treat, such as cookies or cakes, have been replaced with healthy alternatives. Similarly, the British Food Journal found that over a two-year period, fruit and vegetable availability in schools increased from 0.7 percent in 2014 to 3.2 percent in 2016. Further, food products with nutrients that exceeded the recommended thresholds in schools decreased in availability from 90.4 percent to 15 percent from 2014 to 2016.

== Critique of the law ==
There has been pushback against the law, with many individuals, according to a study by Teresa Correa et al., citing "message fatigue" and overexposure — which, they say, dilute the ability of public health campaigns and hamper respondents' ability to digest messages. Some mothers claimed they felt the policy infringed upon their "freedom," as they were no longer allowed to give their children junk food to school, as it would likely be taken away from them.

Critics argue that in addition, the government should tax unhealthy food while subsidizing healthy food, in order to make healthy eating accessible to all socioeconomic groups, simultaneously addressing a significant barrier to healthy eating and increasing the law's effectiveness.

== See also ==
- Food labeling in Mexico
- List of food labeling regulations
- Warning label
