= Food labelling in Canada =

Federal responsibility for Canadian food labelling requirements is shared between two departments, Health Canada and the Canadian Food Inspection Agency (CFIA).

All labelling information that is provided on food labels or in advertisements, as required by legislation, must be accurate, truthful and not misleading. Ingredient lists must accurately reflect the contents and their relative proportions in a food. Nutrition facts tables must accurately reflect the amount of a nutrient present in a food. Net quantity declarations must accurately reflect the amount of food in the package. Certain claims, such as those relating to nutrient content, organic, kosher, halal and certain disease-risk reduction claims, are subject to specific regulatory requirements in addition to the prohibitions in the various acts. For claims that are not subject to specific regulatory requirements, the Canadian Food Inspection Agency (CFIA) and/or Health Canada provide interpretive guidance that assist industry in compliance.

== Primary functions ==
According to the Canadian Food Inspection Agency, a food label serves three primary functions:

1. it provides basic product information (including common name, list of ingredients, net quantity, durable life date, grade/quality, country of origin and name and address of manufacturer, dealer or importer);
2. it provides health, safety, and nutrition information. This includes instructions for safe storage and handling, nutrition information such as the quantity of fats, proteins, carbohydrates, vitamins and minerals present per serving of stated size of the food (in the nutrition facts table), and specific information on products for special dietary use;
3. it acts as a vehicle for food marketing, promotion and advertising (via label vignettes, promotional information and label claims such as low fat, cholesterol-free, high source of fibre, product of Canada, natural, organic, no preservatives added, and so on).

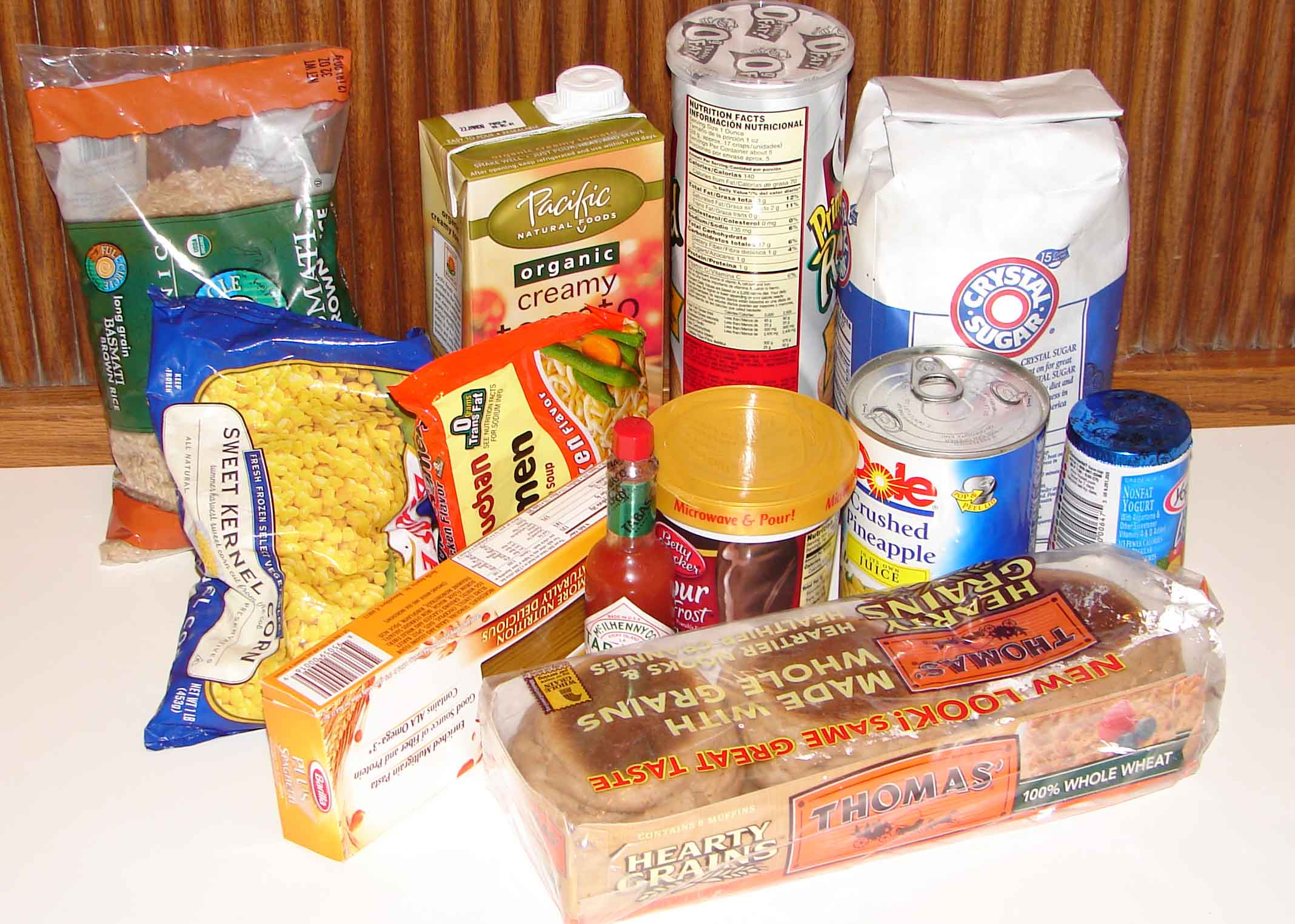
Examples of various common food labelling found in homes

== Requirements ==
Some of the core labelling requirements that are set out by the Canadian Food Inspection Agency include:

=== Common name ===
The common name of a product is the label that someone will see when they pick up a product. The name on the product must comply with three criteria set out by the Government of Canada.

1. What is listed in Canada's set of Food and Drug Regulations
2. The name prescribed by another federal regulation
3. The name by which the food is formally known (for example: orange juice)

The name of the product must also be displayed on the main label in both English and French with a minimum height of 1/16 of an inch (1.6 mm). Exemptions from declaring a common name on the label:

- Fresh fruits or vegetables that are packaged in a way that is visible and identifiable to the public. For example, mushrooms that are in clear packaging do not have to be labelled with the common name "mushrooms".
- Pre-packaged fruits that have a variety of kinds do not require being universally labelled. For example, apples have numerous kinds (i.e. Red Delicious, Granny Smith); these apples can be labelled with their exact kind to benefit the purchaser.

When advertising a common name food, the food must be referred to by its common name. For example, lemon juice from concentrate must be advertised as 'from concentrate' and not just 'lemon juice', as this has the ability to confuse consumers. However, once the ad has referenced the common name at least once, it can be considered acceptable to refer to it from its brand name from then on.

=== Ingredient labelling requirements ===
Unless otherwise exempted, pre-packaged multi-ingredient foods require by law, an ingredient list. In Canada, the ingredients must be displayed in both English and French unless exempted. Ingredients and their components (ingredients of ingredients) also must be listed under their specific names; for example, whey protein must be listed as such, and not just as "protein", which would be ambiguous.

Exceptions to this requirement include "spices, seasonings and herbs (except salt), flavour enhancers, natural and artificial flavourings, food additives, and vitamin and mineral nutrients and derivatives or salts, which may be shown at the end of the ingredient list in any order". The Food and Drug Regulations Act also ensures that "ingredients appear on labels in decreasing order of proportion".

==== Allergens ====
Common allergens such as wheat, peanuts, and dairy must be called out below the ingredient list. On February 16, 2011, the Food and Drug Regulations Act was passed, requiring enhanced labelling requirements for food allergen, gluten sources, and sulphites, beginning on August 4, 2012.

When an allergen is not a listed ingredient but is processed in the same facility so that contamination with trace amounts is possible, a precautionary statement is often given near the ingredient list ("may contain traces of . . . "); this is not required, but Health Canada "considers the use of allergen precautionary statements to be a useful tool in mitigating adverse reactions to priority food allergens if the statements are used appropriately."

=== Nutrition labelling ===
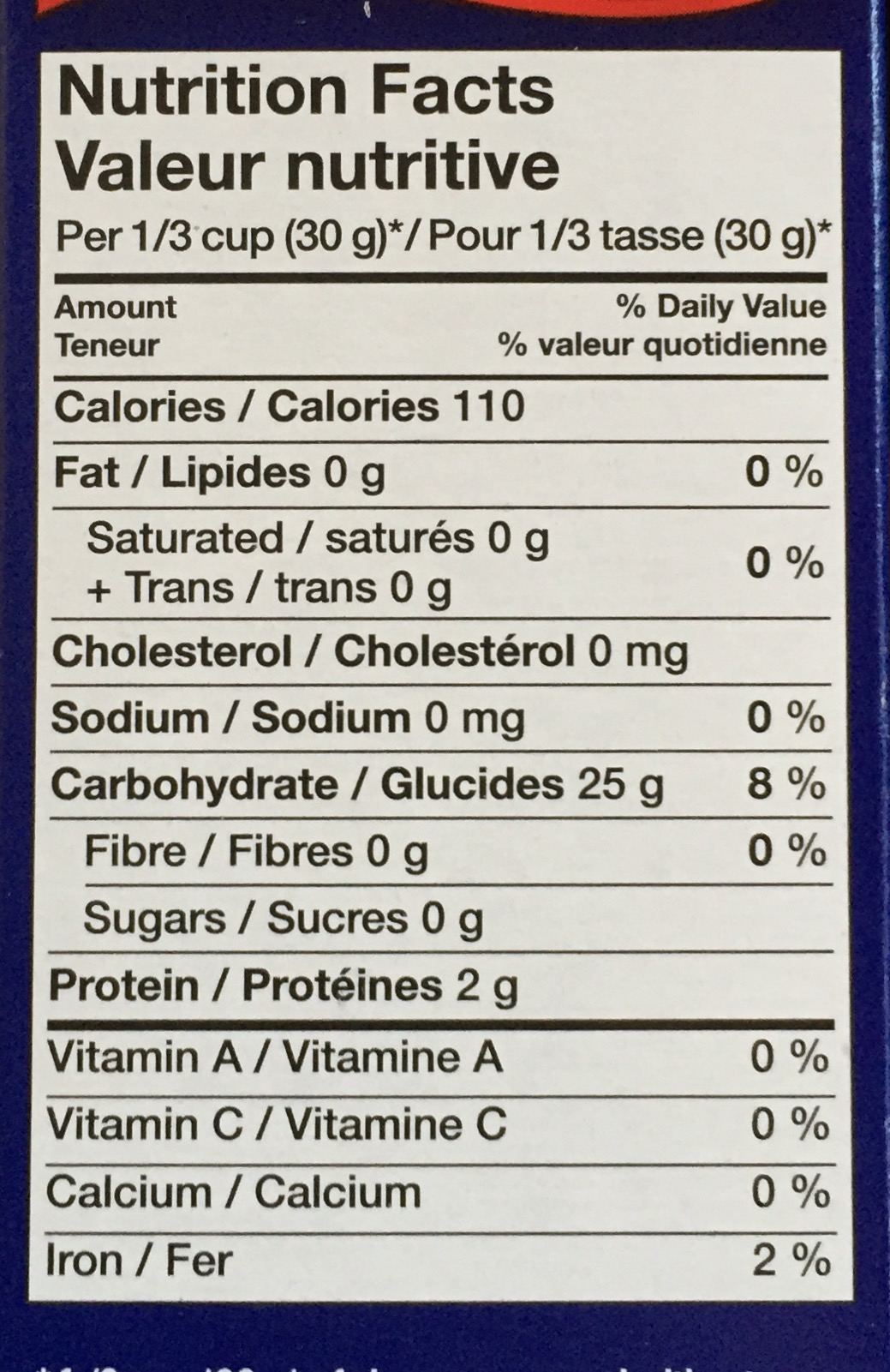
A Canadian nutrition label displaying information in both English and French

By law, nearly all products have a nutrition label in Canada. The nutrition label gives you information about the product including, its serving size, calories, and its percentage of the 13 core nutrients that Canada deems necessary. These nutrients include fat, saturated fat, trans fat, cholesterol, sodium, carbohydrate, fibre, sugars, protein, vitamin A, vitamin C, calcium, and iron. All of these nutrients, except for vitamins and minerals, are recorded based on a reasonable daily intake percentage. Vitamins and minerals are based on a recommended daily intake (RDI). These differ in that one is based on what one is expected to eat in a day, while the other is based on what the government recommends one consume in a day. However, all nutrients are recorded onto the same label with the same guidelines that is prescribed by the Food and Drug Regulations. These guidelines determine that the nutrition label must be clearly and predominantly displayed on the package to the manufacturer as well as clearly visible to the consumer at the time of purchase.

The following foods are exempted from being required to have a nutrition label:

- Fresh fruits and vegetables
- Raw meat and poultry
- Raw seafood
- Foods prepared or processed in store (i.e. bakery items, salads)
- Foods that contain very few nutrients (i.e. tea, coffee)
- Alcoholic beverages

Example front-of-package nutrition advisory, as mandated beginning in 2026.

In June 2022, Health Canada announced new front-of-package labelling requirements for prepackaged foods that contain excess amounts of "nutrients of public health concern". Effective January 2026, prepackaged food products that contain high amounts of saturated fat, sodium, or sugar (usually more than 15% of daily intake percentage) must display a standard advisory label on the top-right corner of their label. The label is meant as an advisory to consumers and does not necessarily communicate the healthiness of a product. The regulation does not apply to products such as raw meat and seafood (a previous iteration of the regulation which did not exempt ground beef faced lobbying from Canada's cattle industry), eggs, and plain milk.

In July 2022, Health Canada also announced the "Supplemented Foods Regulations", which contain additional labelling requirements that took effect immediately for newly-approved products, and all other products in January 2026. Food products that are supplemented (such as, for example, caffeinated energy drinks) must contain a modified nutrition label that lists the nutrients or ingredients that the product has been supplemented with, and their respective amount. Products containing supplements that may be harmful in excess and/or to certain populations (such as caffeine, vitamins, and zinc) must contain a standard front-of-package advisory label, as well as cautionary warnings near the nutrition label.

=== Units of measure ===
In Canada, food products are required to be labelled as to net quantity on the main display panel. The net quantity must be in metric units in English and French, in type that is at least 1.6 millimetres (1/16") high. (If international metric symbols such as "L" or "g" are used instead of words, these are considered bilingual.)

Optionally, Canadian (imperial) or U.S. customary units may be listed in addition to the metric units. In cases where a U.S. unit is used that is smaller than the same-named imperial unit, "U.S." must be designated. (This is not necessary when the U.S. unit is equal to or larger than the imperial unit.) Because these units are optional, they do not need to be stated bilingually, but may be given in English, French, or both.

Rules specify what kinds of food are to be labelled by volume (most liquids), weight (most non-liquids), or count.

=== Date markings ===
- Packaging date: the date a food is placed into a package for the first time for resale to a consumer; or the date a prepackaged product is weighed by a retailer in a package in which it will be offered for sale.
- Storage instructions: How a product should be stored. Can include temperature, humidity, and light conditions.
- Durable life: The period between when a prepackaged package is packaged for resale and when it is good until; based on proper conditions. When the product expires, meaning that it is no longer fit for consumption, it is known as the expiry or best before date. An expiration date in one in which the manufacturer does not recommend the product be consumed (they can be located on any label panel).

The following foods are exempted from having to have a durable life or packaging date:

- Prepackaged fresh fruits and vegetables (including prepackaged, chopped or shredded fresh fruit and vegetables);
- Prepackaged individual portions of food served by restaurants, airlines or other commercial enterprises with meals or snacks (e.g., milk, cheese packets - as they are intended for immediate consumption);
- Prepackaged individual servings of food prepared by a commissary and sold in automatic vending machines or mobile canteens (e.g., sandwiches); and
- Prepackaged donuts

=== Geographical indications ===
A product's geographical indications will tell where the product comes from. In Canada not everything can be locally produced, especially in the winter months in regards to fresh produce. This is why Canada often imports foods such as apples and oranges from places such as Florida and Fiji. Canada's climate only ensures that the citizens have the ability to eat local produce six months of the year. The rest of the year, people who wish to continue a well balanced diet, must purchase produce from grocery stores which buy their produce from other countries.

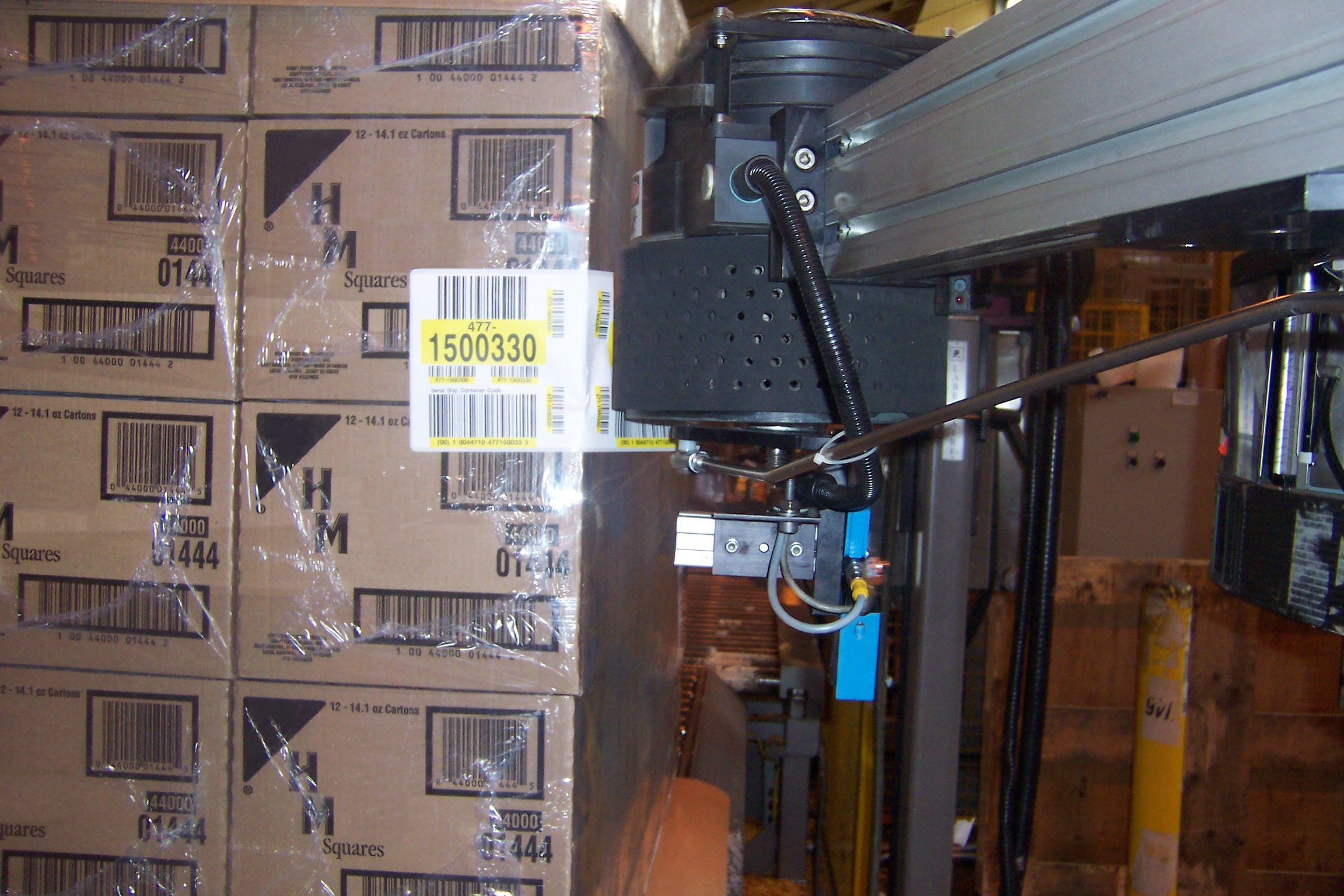
Imported goods

Although readily available in the warmer months, the following food products are imported when not able to be grown or raised in Canada due to its varying climate:

- Dairy products
- Seafood
- Honey
- Fresh fruits and vegetables
- Meat and poultry products
- Processed products (ex: fruit, vegetables, maple products)

Each one of these categories of imported goods have strict guidelines and a minimum standard that they must abide by under the Canadian Food Inspection Agency in order to gain access to Canada. This is to ensure the safety and health of the public. For example, the Fresh Fruit and Vegetable Regulations listed under the Canada Agricultural Products Act set out "packaging, labelling and grade requirements for fresh fruits and vegetables entering into interprovincial or import trade in Canada".

== Advertising ==
All advertising for foods and alcoholic beverages is subject to review by the Food and Drugs Act, Food and Drug Regulations and the Consumer Packaging and Labelling Act and Regulations. Generally, "mandatory information or claims that are acceptable on a food label may also be used to advertise that food". Any type of advertisement that may create a false impression should be avoided as it will then be subject to review by the Consumer Packaging and Labelling Act. In today's society there are many ways in which a company can advertise their products, including radio, television, print and internet; all of these methods have different ways in which they are regulated.

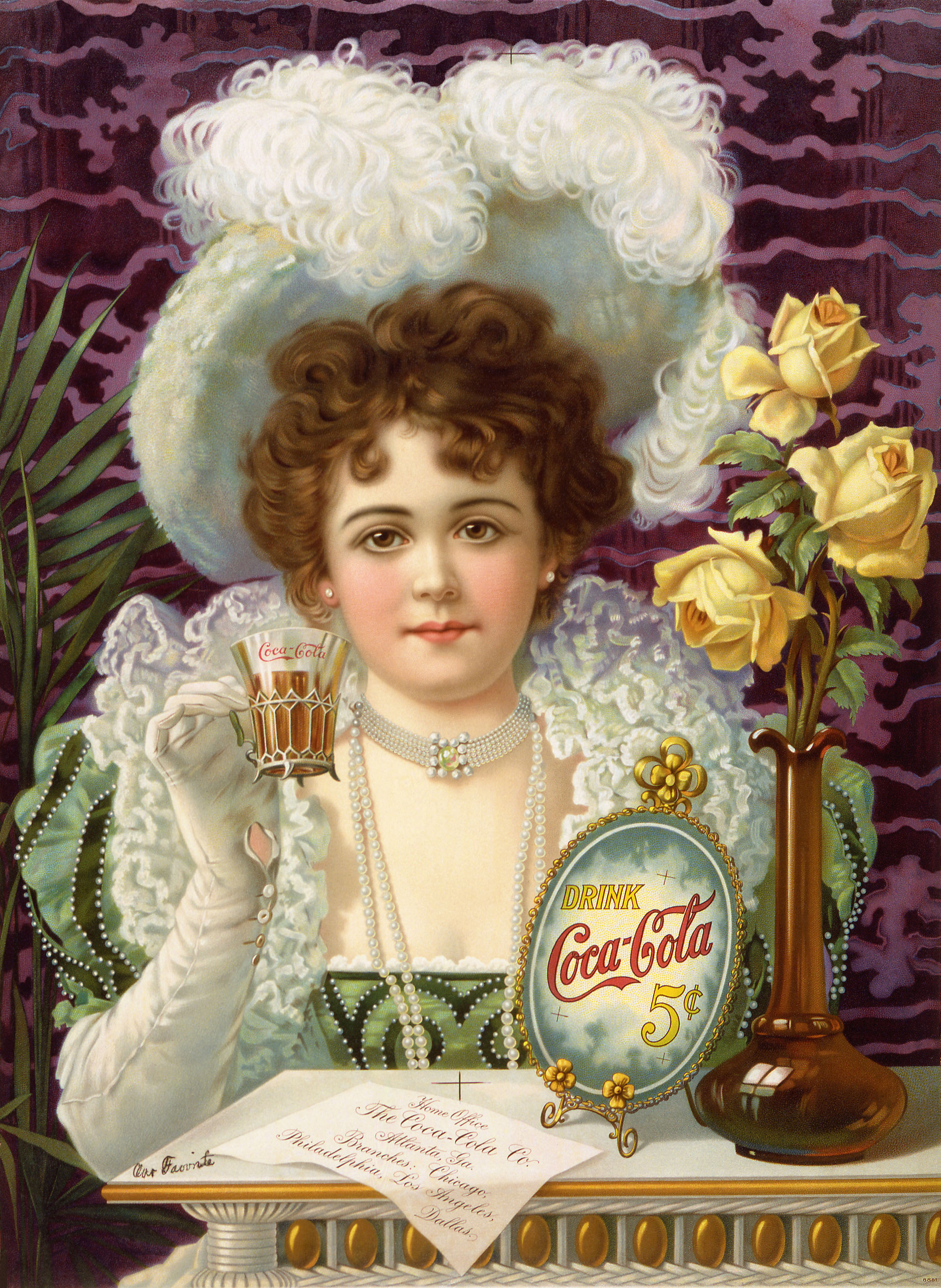
A Coca-Cola advertisement from the 1950s

Radio and television advertisements are reviewed by the Food and Drugs Act and Regulations prior to being allowed to be broadcast. This is to ensure that the potential customers will receive the correct information about a product prior to purchase. It is listed under the Code of Ethics of the Canadian Association of Broadcasters that "no commercial message containing a claim or endorsement of a food or non-alcoholic beverage to which the Food and Drugs Act and Regulations apply may be broadcast unless the script for the commercial message or endorsement has been approved by the Food and Beverage Clearance Section of Advertising Standards Canada (ASC) and carries a current script clearance number"

There is currently no compulsory law regulating print advertisements. However, a company can voluntarily submit an advertisement for review to the Canadian Food Inspection Agency's Food and Labelling Information Service should the company see fit.

Internet advertising is subject to the same criteria as other advertising and is available to the entire Internet-connected world. Many companies utilize this, as it has the capability to reach a large number of people for a low cost and with little effort.

== See also ==
- Food additives
- Food labeling regulations
- Nutrition facts label
- United Kingdom food labelling regulations
