= Dietary exposure assessments in the United States =

Dietary exposure assessments in the United States involve the evaluation of dietary consumption and chemical residue data while taking into consideration additional factors that may affect a specified population of interest or sensitive population. The process of conducting a dietary exposure assessment involves the determination of the chemical residues on a particular food or foods and the calculation of the dietary exposure to these chemicals based on consumption data for the specified food or foods. A dietary exposure assessment allows a comparison to a relevant health standard such as the acceptable daily intake (ADI), the acute reference dose.

== Definition ==
Dietary exposure assessments in the US involve the evaluation of dietary consumption and chemical residue data while taking into consideration additional factors that may affect a specified population of interest or sensitive population. The process of conducting a dietary exposure assessment involves the determination of the chemical residues on a particular food or foods and the calculation of the dietary exposure to these chemicals based on consumption data for the specified food or foods./ In the most simplified form, a dietary exposure assessment can be summarized with the following calculation:* Dietary exposure = food consumption X food chemical concentration

== Purpose ==
Estimating or calculating the dietary exposure to a given chemical or contaminant allows a comparison to a relevant health standard such as the acceptable daily intake(ADI), the acute reference dose (ARfD) or a reference dose (RfD), or a level known to cause adverse effects in animal or human health studies. From this comparison, one can begin to assess the risk of adverse effects from a chemical or contaminant due to dietary exposure.

== Components ==
=== Consumption data ===
In order to assess dietary exposure, it is necessary to understand the dietary consumption of the population being assessed. One must understand the diet of the population of interest, including the quantity and types of foods consumed, in order to determine the exposure to a chemical via the diet. Consumption data for a population of interest can be generated through various types of consumption surveys or it may be available in databases maintained by various government agencies and world organizations. These consumption surveys and databases are discussed in the following sections.

==== Surveys ====
Food consumption surveys are conducted by government agencies and world organization in order to maintain their respective databases. These consumption surveys are also conducted independently to generate data for specific assessment needs. Different types of surveys are used to generate consumption data. It is important to understand the strengths and weaknesses associated with the different types of surveys in order to choose the appropriate survey and interpret existing survey data properly.

===== Food supply surveys =====
Food supply surveys, also known as food balance sheets or food disappearance data are conducted countrywide by almost every country. These surveys provide data on food availability and disappearance rather than actual food consumption. This information does allow for the indirect estimation of the foods consumed by the country's population but does so as an overall average consumption and does not account for consumption variation within the population. Food supply surveys do not take into account food waste or processing but they do allow for assessments at the international level using comparable data. Food supply data is generated from the following equation:

- Food availability = (food production + imports + beginning inventory) – (exports + ending inventory + non-food uses)
- Then the mean per capita availability of a particular food of interest is calculated by dividing the "food availability" by the total population.

In the United States food supply data is generated by the USDA Economic Research Service. The FAO and WHO collect food supply data for countries all over the world and in Europe food supply surveys are conducted by the Organization for Economic Cooperation and Development and the Statistical Office of the European Communities.

===== Household inventory surveys =====
Household inventories account for what food is available in the household. Surveys may include: what food enters the household and where they were purchased, grown or obtained; what foods were used; how they were used; and who used them. Quantities of food are often inventoried as well.

===== Household use surveys =====
Household use survey methods typically include food accounts, inventories, and list recalls which are used to account for all food used in the household during a survey period. Limitations of household use surveys are that they do not include food consumed outside of the household, food waste is often not accounted for and consumption by different subpopulations within the household cannot be distinguished.

===== Individual consumer surveys =====
Individual consumption studies provide data at the individual consumer level. These surveys can be retrospective, prospective, or a combination of both. The most commonly used surveys are retrospective food recall studies or prospective food record studies. Individual consumption surveys obtain diaries from a population-based probability sample of respondents who report detailed information of their food consumption by type.

==== Databases ====
Food consumption databases are available through various government agencies and international organizations. Utilization of consumption databases is useful when it is not possible or not desired to generate new consumption data for an assessment. Choosing the appropriate database is important in order to accurately assess the consumption of the target population being evaluated.

===== USDA Food Availability Data System =====
The USDA Food Availability Data System is one of the primary databases tracking consumption in the United States. The data in this database reflects the amount of food available for human consumption in the United States and is the only source of time series data on U.S. food availability in the country. This database takes regularly consumed foods and aggregates them into approximately 800 core foods with similar raw agricultural commodities. Converting these regularly consumed foods into raw agricultural commodities allows for easier cross referencing with chemical residue databases.

===== WHO GEMS/Food Database =====
Since 1976 the World Health Organization has been implementing the Global Environment Monitoring System – Food Contamination Monitoring and Assessment Program, or GEMS/FOOD which informs governments, institutions and the public on levels and trends of contaminants in food, their contribution to total human health exposure and the significance with regard to public health. Data includes per capita food consumption with diets based on the per capita data compiled by the Food and Agriculture Organization which provides statistics on a country's annual food production, imports and exports found in the FAOSTAT database. This database also includes individual food consumption data based on national surveys and a database of the level of chemicals in raw food commodities. as well as in food as consumed by final consumer.

=== Chemical residues ===
In order to quantify the level of dietary exposure to a chemical residue, the level of the residue of interest within a particular food of interest or the whole food supply must be estimated. Each source of chemical residue data has a unique bias or limitation such as geographical limitation, limited number of commodities, analytical method limitations or sample size limitations.

==== Types ====
There is an extensive range of the types of residues evaluated in dietary exposure assessment. These include naturally occurring chemicals, intentionally applied chemicals, and inadvertently applied chemicals. Some examples of chemicals include pesticides, herbicides, insecticides, fungicides or other chemicals used for agricultural purposes. These chemical residues may be found as a result of intentional application or from inadvertent application when wind or water carries them away from the source of application. Other residues may be antibiotics, heavy metals such as lead, or naturally occurring toxins such as mycotoxins, phycotoxins and phytotoxins.

==== Residue databases ====
Although chemical residue data can be generated independently for specific research or assessment needs, primary sources for chemical residue data are various databases maintained by government agencies. These databases typically contain data for residues found on raw agricultural commodities which is collected during routine monitoring and enforcement.

===== FDA Total Diet Study =====
The US FDA Total Diet Study also referred to as the market basket study determines levels of various contaminants such as pesticide residues, industrial chemicals, toxic and nutrient elements and other nutrients in foods. The foods analyzed are purchased at the retail level and prepared as they would be consumed prior to analysis so that the analytical results are indicative of realistic estimates of dietary intake. The complete overview of FDA Total Diet Study and data from 1991 to present can be found be found on the FDA's website.

===== USDA Pesticide Data Program =====
The USDA Pesticide Data Program (PDP) is a database containing pesticide residue data at the raw agricultural commodity level. The USDA started it in 1991 to test commodities in the U.S food supply for pesticide residues. Since the passage of the Food Quality Protection Act (FQPA), one of the focuses of the PDP has been testing foods, which are most likely consumed by infants and children. The monitoring program is run by the USDA Agricultural Marketing Service (AMS) which partners with state agencies to collect and analyze pesticide residue data. The EPA uses this data to enhance its programs for food safety and evaluate dietary exposure to pesticides.

=== Supplemental information ===
In addition to dietary consumption data and chemical residue data, dietary exposure assessments often need to consider other real world factors that may affect the level of exposure or a corresponding adverse effect for a particular population. A couple of the most common examples of supplemental information are the evaluation of any sensitive populations that fall within the scope of the assessment and the evaluation of the point at which residue data is collected compared to how foods are consumed. These two factors are discussed in the following sections.

==== Sensitive populations ====
Exposure assessments must also take into consideration sensitive subgroups of the population such as infants, children, nursing women and the elderly who may be more susceptible to adverse health effects of exposure. A sensitive population could also be one in which the exposure level is much greater than the average for reasons such as geography, culture, or traditional diets. When characterizing exposure, it is necessary to evaluate it in the context of these more susceptible populations as well as the general public.

==== Raw agricultural commodities compared to food as consumed ====
Residue data is often collected on raw agricultural commodities at the time of harvest which is not necessarily representative or the residue levels present at the time of consumption. The processing and preparation of commodities is subject to increase or decrease the level of residues at the time of consumption. For example, dehydration of a product may increase the concentration of antibiotic residue whereas washing of produce may reduce the concentration of a pesticide residue. Since chemical residue data is often only available at the raw agricultural commodity level and consumption data is often available for foods as consumed, it is necessary to convert between foods as consumed and raw agricultural commodities. This can be completed with custom models or with national databases.

===== USDA Food Intakes Converted to Retail Commodities =====
The USDA Food Intakes Converted to Retail Commodities Database converts foods consumed in national dietary surveys to retail-level commodities. The databases were developed by USDA Agricultural Research Service and Economic Research Service from six dietary surveys conducted between 1994 and 2008. Foods from these surveys are converted into 65 retail-level commodities grouped into eight major categories.

== Dietary exposure models and examples ==
Quantifying dietary exposure most often involves the use of models, which vary in complexity depending on the tier, or level of detail of the assessment in which they are utilized. Lower tier models may be deterministic and use single point estimates for inputs whereas higher tier models may be more stochastic, utilizing probabilistic inputs. Simple dietary exposure models calculate dietary intake of the chemical of concern as the product of the mass of the food item consumed during the specified time period and the average concentration of the contaminant in the item. This basic approach is also used in more complex models; however, the contributions of various food items and types are summed as inputs. Exposure model outputs can be expressed as a single point estimates or as a probability distribution. In general, the more robust and extensive the input data, the more accurate the estimate of exposure.

Modeling dietary exposure is important to support dietary risk assessments. Validated dietary exposure models can be used in total ingestion studies which focus on the level of exposure to a contaminant from all food sources and they can also be used in aggregate exposure models, which may include exposure to a chemical or contaminant through inhalation and dermal or skin contact exposure. In addition, dietary exposure models are useful for identifying at risk populations and potential exposure "hot-spots". For government agencies, modeling dietary exposure is especially useful in estimating possible exposure to a chemical during a pre-market review. An example of such review would the evaluation of a new pesticide by the Environmental Protection Agency (EPA) to determine if it is safe for use or to determine regulations to control such use. Dietary exposure assessments are often completed using models to simulate exposure. Once dietary consumption data, chemical residue data and any additional supplemental information has been compiled, one can utilize the data to model the dietary exposure of the population of interest to the chemical of interest. Most commonly, computer models are used to combine dietary intake and residue data. These models can be designed specifically for an intended application or there are standard models available that can be used for dietary exposure assessments. Two existing models are detailed in the following sections.

=== Dietary Exposure Potential Model ===
The Dietary Exposure Potential Model is an EPA dietary exposure model. The DEPM database system contains numerous national, government-sponsored food intake surveys and chemical residue data from monitoring programs. In this model, consumption is expressed in terms 11 food groups containing 800 core foods which were selected to allow matching between food consumption and chemical residue data. These 800 core food items were established from mean values of consumption of over 6,700 foods commonly identified in food surveys. This model utilizes per capita food consumption rates for these 800 core foods for the population in the USA and also for roughly 24 subpopulations defined by different demographic factors such as gender, age, and ethnicity. A critical component of the DEPM model is the recipes, which convert food as consumed to the raw agricultural commodities for which the chemical residue data is collected. The residue database contains average values of residues for more than 350 pesticides and environmental contaminants.

The model is run by selecting a food consumption database, a chemical residue database and a population. Based on these selections the model output is the average daily intake of a chemical for an individual with the average diet for the selected population. A diet can be specified based on selecting core foods then that diet can be matched with residue data and used to estimate exposure.

=== Dietary Exposure Evaluation Model (DEEM) ===
Dietary Exposure Evaluation Model (DEEM) is a computer based model developed by Novigen Sciences, Inc. that estimates dietary intake of chemical residues and provides output including dietary exposure estimates for different time ranges for populations or for individuals. This model converts food consumed to raw agricultural commodities using the USDA-EPA Food Commodity Intake Database] recipes. DEEM utilizes Monte Carlo analysis to provide probabilistic assessments of dietary pesticide exposure. The EPA Office of Pesticide Programs uses DEEM for exposure and risk assessments. The DEEM can be used for cumulative exposure analysis when multiple chemicals on multiple foods must be evaluated for a total exposure assessment. Also, DEEM software can be used with Calendex which is a cumulative aggregate exposure assessment software used to combine dietary and non-dietary or residential exposures.
