= Nutri-Score =

Nutrition label

Nutri-Score label (A) for the highest nutritional quality

The Nutri-Score, also known as the 5-Colour Nutrition label or 5-CNL, is a five-colour nutrition label and nutritional rating system that attempts to provide simplified information about the overall nutritional value of food products, and compare them relative to other foods in the same category. It assigns products a rating letter from A (best) to E (worst), with associated colors from green to red. High content of fruits and vegetables, fibers, protein and healthy oils (rapeseed, walnut and olive oils, rule added in 2019) per 100 g of food product promote a preferable score, while high content of energy, sugar, saturated fatty acids, and sodium per 100 g promote a detrimental score.

France was the first country to use the system and it has been recommended by other European Union countries as well as the European Commission and the World Health Organization. Due to the system's methodology, its implementation for general use is controversial in some EU countries.

== History and origin ==
This system was selected by the French government in March 2017 to be displayed on food products after it was compared against several labels proposed by industry or retailers. The system relies on the computation of a nutrient profiling system derived from the United Kingdom Food Standards Agency nutrient profiling system (FSA score). It was created by Santé Publique France, the French public health agency, based on the work of Serge Hercberg from Sorbonne Paris North University. Other bodies involved in the development of the system included the Agency for Food, Environmental and Occupational Health and Safety (ANSES) and the High Council for Public Health (HCSP).

At the end of April 2023, the competent authorities of the countries that have adopted the Nutri-Score announced that its algorithm would be updated and in 2025, the European Union reportedly abandoned plans to make the Nutri-Score mandatory across all member states.

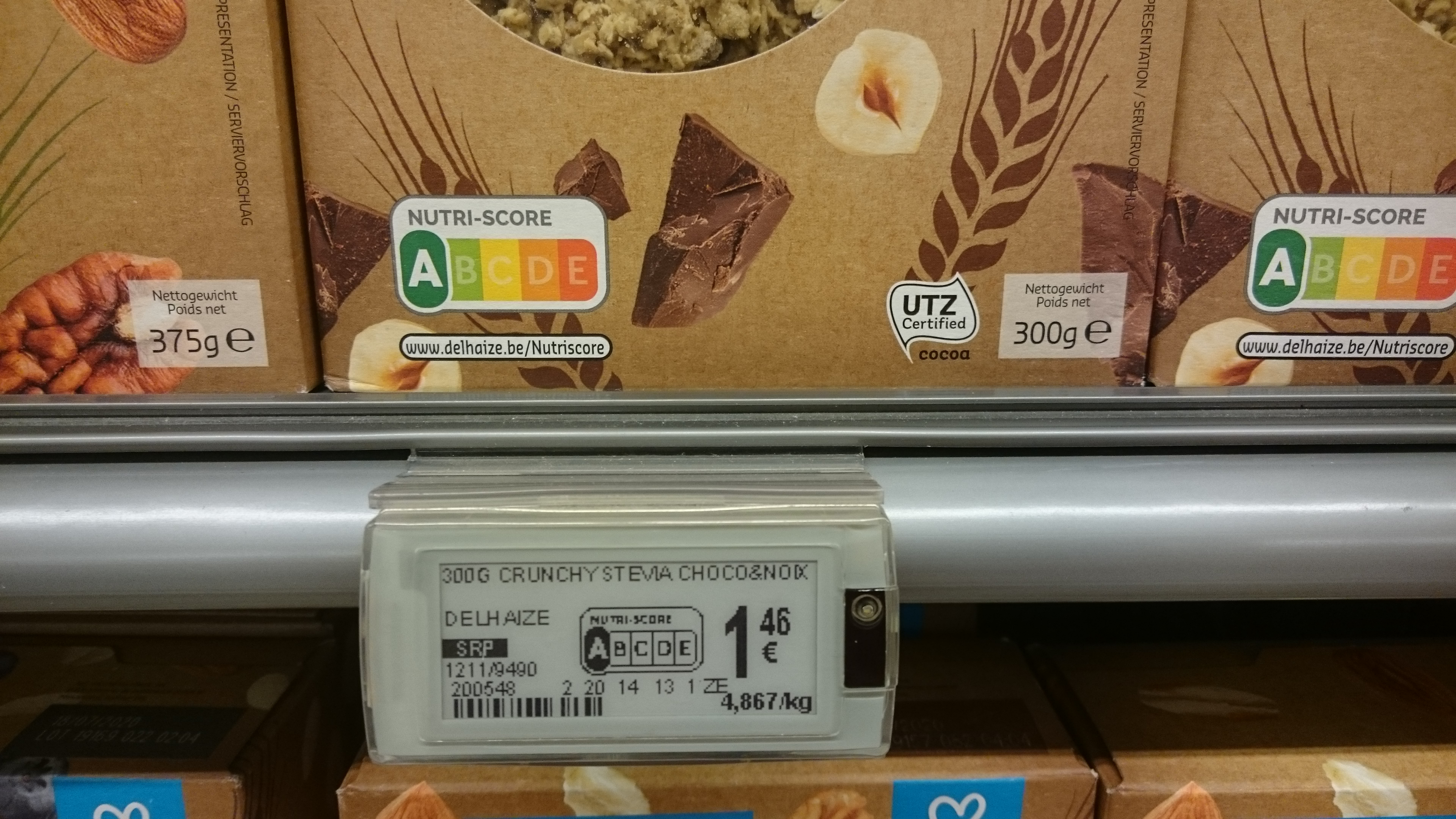
Delhaize crunchy muesli price and Nutri-Score, in Belgium

== Goal ==
The key assumption behind the system is that the Nutri-Score colour label is always displayed on the front of packaging. Its goal is to allow consumers to compare the overall nutritional value of food products from the same group (category), including food products from different manufacturers. The underlying intention was to help consumers quickly make an informed choice from among similarly packaged products by differentiating those that should be consumed in greater quantities from those that should be consumed in moderation (in smaller quantities or less often).

== Calculation ==
=== Overview of algorithm ===
The calculation process is based on a concept developed by the UK Food Standards Agency, also known as “model WXYfm”, which was evaluated in 2005 by Professor Mike Rayner.

The basic calculation algorithm consists of three steps, and is based on the nutritional contents of the food:

- Negative points (N) are calculated based on the content of various nutrients considered problematic, such as sugar.
- Positive points (P) are calculated based on the content of various nutrients considered beneficial, such as protein.
- The total score is calculated. In simple cases, the formula is just N-P (see below), however there are some special cases.

Based on the total score, a label ranging from A (best) to E (worst) is assigned.

Nutritional contents negatively (N) affecting the Nutri-Score are:

- high energy density per 100 g or per 100 ml,
- high sugar content,
- high content of saturated fatty acids,
- high salt content.

Nutritional contents positively (P) affecting the Nutri-Score are:

- content of fruits, vegetables, nuts and legumes
- fiber content,
- protein content,
- content of rapeseed, walnut and olive oil.

In addition to the general algorithm described above, there are special rules for cheese, for “added fats” (fats that are meant as ingredients, such as vegetable oils or butter), and for beverages. While the basic principle remains, some parts of the calculation are changed (see below).

=== Detailed description ===
This table describes the rules for assigning negative and positive points for different nutritional contents.

Nutri-Score points system
	Negative points								Positive points			
Category	A = Energy density		B = Simple sugars		C = Saturated fats		D = Salt	Category	E = Fruit and vegetables		F = Fibre	G = Protein
Unit	kcal / 100g	kcal / 100 ml	g / 100g	g / 100ml	g / 100g	%	mg / 100g	Unit	%	%	g / 100g	g / 100g
Points		(used for beverages)		(used for beverages)		(used for cooking fats)		Points		(used for beverages)		
0	< 80	< 7.2	< 4.5	≤ 0	≤ 1	< 10	< 90	0	< 40	< 40	< 0.7	< 1.6
1	> 80	< 7.2	> 4.5	< 1.5	> 1	< 16	> 90	1	> 40		> 0.7	> 1.6
2	> 160	< 14.3	> 9.0	< 3.0	> 2	< 22	> 180	2	> 60	> 40	> 1.4	> 3.2
3	> 240	< 21.5	> 13.5	< 4.5	> 3	< 28	> 270	3			> 2.1	> 4.8
4	> 320	< 28.5	> 18.0	< 6.0	> 4	< 34	> 360	4		>60	> 2.8	> 6.4
5	> 400	< 35.9	> 22.5	< 7.5	> 5	< 40	> 450	5	> 80		> 3.5	> 8.0
6	> 480	< 43.0	> 27.0	< 9.0	> 6	< 46	> 540	6				
7	> 560	< 50.2	> 31.0	< 10.5	> 7	< 52	> 630	7				
8	> 640	< 57.4	> 36.0	< 12.0	> 8	< 58	> 720	8				
9	> 720	< 64.5	> 40.0	< 13.5	> 9	< 64	> 810	9				
10	> 800	> 64.5	> 45.0	> 13.5	> 10	> 64	> 900	10		> 80		
	Total negative points: A + B + C + D								Total positive points: E + F + G			

On the basis of its calculation algorithm, the system awards 0 to 10 points for energy value and ingredients that should be limited in the diet, i.e.: saturated fatty acids, sugar and salt; and 0 to 5 points for beneficial ingredients whose consumption should be promoted. These are: fiber, protein, fruits, vegetables, legumes, nuts, and rapeseed oil. To determine the value of the label of a given product, i.e. the letter A, B, C, D or E, the sum of points awarded for the beneficial ingredients must be subtracted from the sum of points awarded for the unwelcome ingredients. The product is classified in one of five value classes (A to E) based on the final score, which may vary from -15 to +40. The lower the score, the better the nutritional value of the product.

A Nutri-Score for a particular food item is given in one of five classification letters, varying depending on the food type (general foods, beverages, and fats, oils, nuts, and seeds), with 'A' being a preferable score and 'E' being a detrimental score. For general foods, an A grade is awarded to foods with scores below 0, a B from 1 to 2, a C from 3 to 10, a D from 11 to 18, and an E for any score over 19. For fats, oils, nuts, and seeds, an A is awarded when the score is below -6, a B from -5 to 2, a C from 3 to 10, a D from 11 to 18, and an E for scores above 19. For drinks, only water is awarded an A grade while a B is anything below 2, a C from 3 to 6, a D from 7 to 9, and an E for scores above 10.

In addition to the general calculation rules applied to most types of food, there are special rules for cheese, for “added fats” (fats that are meant as ingredients, such as vegetable oils or butter), and for beverages. For these categories, the score is calculated in a slightly different way. More specifically, in the classic calculation model, the protein content is taken into account or not - depending on the total score calculated for the negative ingredients. For cheese, the protein content is taken into account at all times, irrespective of the total detrimental score. For added fats, instead of the total amount of saturated fats, the ratio of saturated fats to total fat content is taken into account, and instead of total energy content, only the energy content from saturated fats is counted. The algorithm is indifferent to the degree of food processing or such ingredients as vitamins, bioactive substances (antioxidants etc.), fiber type, or food additives.

While Nutri-Score is not used with foods not covered by the mandatory nutrition declaration (listed in Annex V of EP and Council Regulation (EU) No 1169/2011), the system's methodology actually devalues those foods.

=== 2022 changes to the algorithm ===
In 2022, the update report from the Scientific Committee of the Nutri-Score recommends the following changes for the algorithm:

In the main algorithm

- A modified Sugars component, using a point allocation scale aligned with the FIC regulation of 3.75% of the 90 g reference value, with up to 15 points [1]
- A modified Salt component, using a point allocation scale aligned with the FIC regulation of 3.75% of the 6 g reference value, with up to 20 points
- A modified Fibres component, using a point allocation scale of 3.75% of the 30 g reference value (as recommended in various EU countries), and with a starting point set at the value aligned with the claims regulation for the claim of “source of fibre”, with up to 5 points
- A modified Proteins component, using a point allocation scale aligned with the claims regulation of “source of proteins” of 3.75% of the 64 g reference value, with up to 7 points
- A modified ‘Fruit, vegetables, legumes’ component, with the removal of nuts and oils from the ingredients qualifying for the component
- A simplification of the final computation, with a removal of the protein cap exemption for products with A points ≥11 and fruit and vegetable points ≥5
- A modified final threshold between A and B, set at -1/0 points

In the ‘fats, oils, nuts and seeds’ component

- The inclusion of nuts and seeds within this category, based on their nutritional composition in fats
- A modified Energy component, set as an ‘Energy from saturates’ component, with a point allocation scale of 120KJ/point
- A modified protein cap threshold, set at 7 points for proteins to be taken into account
- A modified ‘fruit, vegetables and legumes’ component, with oils from ingredients qualifying in the component included as qualifying (e.g. avocado and olive)
- A modified final threshold between A and B, set at -6/-5

Specific rules for red meat products within the main algorithm for general foods

- Based on their position in FBDG
- A modified protein component, with a reduction in the maximal number of points attributed for red meat and products thereof, proportionate to the ratio of heme iron to total iron content in meat and products, set therefore at 2 maximal points for proteins

== Adoption of the Nutri-Score ==
Adoption of the Nutri-Score in Europe: Government has recommended the use Voluntary use by manufacturers No data Government is opposed

It was thought that EU laws did not allow countries to unilaterally impose their own food labeling system, and thus that they could only give recommendations. However, in June 2026 Foodwatch published a legal memorandum stating that EU member states could in fact make the Nutri-Score mandatory.

Currently, the Nutri-Score system is applied on a voluntary basis in European Union countries such as:

- France (despite opposition from farmers and the food industry who tried to stall or delay the decision, the system was eventually adopted by the French Ministry of Health in early 2017.),
- Belgium (formally since 2 April 2019),
- Spain (in November 2018, the Spanish Health Minister María Luisa Carcedo supported voluntary implementation of the Nutri-Score system, but did not introduce any national legislation governing its use).

The Nutri-Score system was adopted for voluntary use and first implemented in France in 2017. Its implementation is supervised by the French Agency for Public Health (Santé Publique France), a body reporting to the French Ministry of Health. In recent years, other countries have also decided to formally accept the system for voluntary use in their domestic markets: Belgium (2018), Switzerland (2019), Germany (2020), Luxembourg (2020) and the Netherlands (2021).

In Portugal, Slovenia and Austria, some food companies such as Nestlé, Auchan or Danone announced that they would use the Nutri-Score although it was not officially recommended by the authorities. In Ukraine, Nutri-Score has been adopted by Silpo, the country's second-largest supermarket chain, for its store brand produce.

Opposition to Nutri-Score is from a coalition of countries including Italy, the Czech Republic, Cyprus, Greece, Hungary, Latvia, and Romania. The Italian government has proposed a competing food label system. Southern EU countries say Nutri-Score puts the traditional Mediterranean diet at a disadvantage.

The score is also used by Open Food Facts to allow people to compare the nutritional value of products.

The EU administration works towards the introduction of a common and compulsory front-of-pack nutrition labelling system, and the Nutri-Score system is one of the analyzed solutions.

In their studies, the European Commission and the World Health Organisation point to the need for a transparent, simple and intuitive food labelling system. However, they do not specify which particular food labelling system they recommend. The European Commission believes that front-of-pack nutrition labelling systems can help consumers make informed dietary choices and it seems appropriate to introduce harmonised mandatory front-of-pack nutrition labelling at the EU level. By the end of 2022, the European Commission intends to launch EU-wide public consultation on an EU harmonised and mandatory front-of-pack nutrition labelling. Also WHO is not in a position to recommend any specific labelling scheme. WHO encourages countries and research institutions to further analyze information and collect data to better understand the impact of different front-of-pack labelling systems on consumer behaviour and dietary choices.

Due to the system's controversial methodology and calculation algorithm and incompatibility with the EU Farm to Fork Strategy, the need for a more comprehensive labelling system has been reported.

In September 2026, Poland has declared an abolition on Nutri-Score.

== Comparison of food rating systems ==
Prior to the adoption of Nutri-Score in France, a 10-week study was conducted in September 2016, covering 60 supermarkets in 4 French regions. The aim of the study was to compare the efficiency of: Nutri-Score, Nutrimark HSR, UK's Multiple Traffic Light (MTL), SENS, Nutri-Reperes. The algorithms used to calculate the Nutri-Score and SENS scores were validated by ANSES. In addition to the positive findings on the usefulness of Nutri-Score, evidence is also available to demonstrate the usefulness of other food labelling systems. In a large international study covering 12 countries from different parts of the world (a study group of over 12,000 consumers from Bulgaria, Canada, Denmark, France, Germany, Mexico, Singapore, Spain, the UK and the USA) looking at five different traffic light systems, the Multiple Traffic Lights (MTL) system received the highest score. The respondents were asked to rate randomly selected systems in terms of: likeability, trust, understandability, relevance, and obligatory use. Research on improvements in consumer dietary choices owed to the influence of different front-of-pack labelling systems has shown that the efficiency of the MTL and Nutri-Score is similar. Conversely, a study of Italian consumers (a group of 1000+ respondents) showed that none of the five labelling systems tested, including Nutri-Score, was significantly better at changing their food choices, though Nutri-Score led to the correct rankings more often than other systems.

== Efficacy studies ==
Most food rating systems lack scientific support from studies in real supermarkets. One meta-analysis concluded that "findings on the efficacy of front-of-pack nutrition labels in ‘nudging’ consumers toward healthier food purchases remain mixed and inconclusive". In this meta-analysis Nutri-Score was not taken into account, because no real supermarket study existed. In December 2021 the only study of the efficacy of Nutri-Score in a supermarket was published. In this study the Nutri-Score was printed on electronic shelve labels and not on the products in a colour-code. The authors concluded that "the impact of ESL (Electronic Shelf-edge Labeling) on consumer purchases was mixed...Shelf labeling on its own is unlikely to significantly influence consumer behaviours." Thus far, no study of the application of the effect of the application of a full-coloured Nutri-Score on food labels in a whole supermarket assortment exists, so the efficacy of Nutri-Score in a realistic supermarket setting is unknown.

Researchers from Göttingen University found that the use of Nutri-Score could prevent products from appearing healthier than they really are.

A paper analysing the potential impact of the Nutri-Score system on selected products was published in late 2022. A number of disadvantages of this system were demonstrated, such as not taking into account the size of packaging, the content of vitamins, minerals and other bioactive substances, not taking into account the degree of processing of the product or the glycaemic index, as well as discriminating against many products, including regional and organic products. The need to significantly refine and improve this system before it is rolled out to the general public was also pointed out.

== Concerns regarding implementation ==
Some criticize that due to its methodological limitations, the system may promote highly processed foods of low nutritional value, while devaluing natural, organic and regional products. The system is not intended as a tool for comparing the nutritional value of products from different categories. If consumers are not aware of this, information placed on product packaging may be misinterpreted. The system also does not guarantee that the consumer's choice of only products with the highest rating will allow them to compose a balanced diet - this was stated by 80% of surveyed experts. Criticism of the Nutri-Score system states that, while the system is intuitive and created with good intentions, it still has flaws that must be addressed before it can be considered to correctly indicate the nutritional value of food products. Additionally, the EFSA approach for substantiation of health claims indicates there is insufficient evidence to support a health claim based on the Nutri-Score system, since a cause-and-effect relationship could not be established.

The Italian antitrust authority (AGCM, Autorita' Garante della Concorrenza e del Mercato) has reported opening five investigations related to the use of Nutri-Score labels on the front of packaging by GS, Carrefour Italia, Pescanova Italia, Valsoia, as well as by the French companies Regime Dukan, Diet Lab, the English company Weetabix and the German confectionery company *Vivil A. Müller GmbH & Co. KG* (*VIVIL*).

The AGCM also opened proceedings against the French owner of a smartphone app called Yuka, which is intended to help users assess the nutritional value of products based on the Nutri-Score system. The app presents alternatives to D or E rated foods. AGCM's key concern is that in the absence of appropriate warnings, the Nutri-Score label and the scores and ratings presented in the app are misperceived as absolute health ratings for a given product, without addressing an individual's overall needs (diet and lifestyle), amount and frequency of consumption as part of a varied and balanced diet. Consequently, consumers may be more prone to associate health characteristics with products with a high Nutri-Score or Yuka rating, and thus to unreasonably attribute health effects to the choices made on that basis. Specifically, AGCM pointed out to the attribution of positive health properties to products labelled with the highest Nutri-Score.

== See also ==
- Food labelling and advertising law (Chile)
- Food labeling in Mexico
