= Acceptable Market Name =

Names for seafoods in the U.S.

In the United States, an Acceptable Market Name refers to the designated name under which a seafood species can be marketed and sold in interstate commerce. These names are established to ensure consistency, prevent consumer deception, and facilitate accurate identification of seafood products.

== Regulatory framework ==
The United States Food and Drug Administration (FDA) provides guidance on acceptable market names through “The Seafood List,” a comprehensive directory that includes the acceptable market names, common names, scientific names, and vernacular names of seafood species sold in the U.S. This list serves as a reference for industry stakeholders to ensure proper labeling of seafood products.

An acceptable market name may be:

1. Established by either a history of common usage in the U.S. or by statute or regulation;
2. As used by accredited scientific fishery resources and recognized within U.S. commerce, except when prohibited by law or regulation; or
3. Specifically created for a species (e.g., “basa” for Pangasius bocourti).

The FDA's guidance documents, including “The Seafood List,” are recommendations and not legally enforceable unless specific regulatory or statutory requirements are cited.

== Compliance and enforcement ==
The FDA monitors seafood labeling to ensure that market names used are consistent with those listed in “The Seafood List.” Mislabeling seafood can lead to products being deemed misbranded under the Federal Food, Drug, and Cosmetic Act, resulting in enforcement actions such as product seizures or import refusals.
