= List of countries by obesity rate =

Countries by obesity rate, data from WHO 2022

This is a list of countries and territories by obesity rate, with data from the World Health Organization (WHO), as of 2024.

== List ==
Prevalence of obesity (BMI >30) among adults aged 18+ (WHO, 2024).

Rank	Country	Both sexes
1	American Samoa (United States)	75.8%
2	Cook Islands	72.4%
3	Tonga	72.3%
4	Nauru	71.4%
5	Tokelau (New Zealand)	70.0%
6	Niue	66.2%
7	Tuvalu	64.7%
8	Samoa	63.2%
9	French Polynesia (France)	49.5%
10	The Bahamas	48.4%
11	Saint Kitts and Nevis	47.9%
12	Micronesia	46.8%
13	Kiribati	45.3%
14	Belize	43.2%
15	Egypt	42.8%
16	Qatar	42.4%
17	Palau	42.1%
18	United States of America	42%
19	Kuwait	41.3%
20	Marshall Islands	41.2%
21	Chile	41.1%
22	Georgia	40.1%
23	Barbados	39.6%
24	Fiji	39.3%
25	Saudi Arabia	39.2%
26	Argentina	38.1%
27	Panama	37.8%
28	Brunei	37.7%
29	Romania	37.7%
30	Mexico	37.4%
31	Hungary	36.9%
32	Iraq	36.8%
33	Croatia	36.5%
34	Uruguay	36.3%
35	Jamaica	35.7%
36	Bahrain	35.5%
37	Antigua and Barbuda	35.4%
38	Saint Lucia	35.4%
39	Saint Vincent and the Grenadines	35.0%
40	Seychelles	34.9%
41	New Zealand	34.7%
42	Paraguay	34.2%
43	Nicaragua	34.0%
44	Greece	33.7%
45	Libya	33.5%
46	Costa Rica	33.4%
47	Malta	33.3%
48	Jordan	33.2%
49	Palestine	33.2%
50	Dominica	32.9%
51	Australia	32.4%
52	Trinidad and Tobago	32.0%
53	Grenada	31.9%
54	Czech Republic	31.6%
55	Lebanon	31.5%
56	El Salvador	31.4%
57	South Africa	31.3%
58	North Macedonia	31.2%
59	Brazil	30.9%
60	Honduras	30.8%
61	Suriname	30.8%
62	Dominican Republic	30.7%
63	Ireland	30.6%
64	Uzbekistan	30.6%
65	Turkey	30.5%
66	Slovakia	30.3%
67	United Arab Emirates	30.3%
68	Syria	29.9%
69	Guyana	29.8%
70	Oman	29.4%
71	Azerbaijan	29.3%
72	Greenland	29.3%
73	United Kingdom	29.2%
74	Peru	29.1%
75	Bolivia	28.8%
76	Ecuador	28.7%
77	Armenia	28.6%
78	Latvia	27.9%
79	Ukraine	27.8%
80	Tunisia	27.7%
81	Papua New Guinea	27.6%
82	Albania	27.3%
83	Canada	27.1%
84	Eswatini	27.1%
85	Moldova	27.0%
86	Guatemala	26.7%
87	Finland	26.2%
88	Belarus	26.1%
89	Bosnia and Herzegovina	26.1%
90	Lithuania	26.1%
91	Poland	25.9%
92	Iran	25.7%
93	Serbia	25.6%
94	Mongolia	25.5%
95	Colombia	25.3%
96	Cuba	25.0%
97	Estonia	25.0%
98	Germany	24.5%
99	Algeria	24.3%
100	Bulgaria	24.0%
101	Cyprus	23.7%
102	Malaysia	23.6%
103	Iceland	23.5%
104	Pakistan	23.5%
105	Israel	23.3%
106	Portugal	23.0%
107	Venezuela	23.0%
108	Belgium	22.9%
109	Slovenia	22.8%
110	Kazakhstan	22.4%
111	Mauritania	22.1%
112	Morocco	22.0%
113	Gabon	21.8%
114	Vanuatu	21.6%
115	Kyrgyzstan	21.5%
116	Russia	21.2%
117	Turkmenistan	21.2%
118	Mauritius	21.1%
119	Tajikistan	21.0%
120	Luxembourg	20.9%
121	Solomon Islands	20.9%
122	Norway	20.7%
123	Montenegro	20.6%
124	Lesotho	20.2%
125	Andorra	19.5%
126	Spain	18.9%
127	Afghanistan	18.8%
128	Equatorial Guinea	18.8%
129	Sweden	18.7%
130	Austria	18.3%
131	Botswana	18.1%
132	Maldives	18.1%
133	Italy	17.9%
134	Netherlands	16.9%
135	Singapore	16.8%
136	Liberia	16.7%
137	Namibia	16.7%
138	Cape Verde	16.5%
139	São Tomé and Príncipe	16.3%
140	Comoros	16.1%
141	Sudan	16.1%
142	Thailand	15.5%
143	Denmark	15.2%
144	Cameroon	14.6%
145	Ghana	13.8%
146	Zimbabwe	13.1%
147	Bhutan	13.0%
148	Somalia	13.0%
149	Switzerland	12.9%
150	France	12.5%
151	Togo	12.2%
152	Nigeria	12.1%
153	North Korea	12.1%
154	Indonesia	12.0%
155	Ivory Coast	12.0%
156	Angola	11.8%
157	Mali	11.6%
158	Yemen	11.6%
159	Republic of the Congo	11.5%
160	Guinea-Bissau	11.4%
161	Djibouti	11.2%
162	The Gambia	11.2%
163	Sri Lanka	11.2%
164	Benin	10.9%
165	Haiti	10.7%
166	Tanzania	10.5%
167	Kenya	10.4%
168	Senegal	10.3%
169	Zambia	10.1%
170	Philippines	9.7%
171	Guinea	9.4%
172	Mozambique	9.4%
173	China	9.1%
174	Laos	9.0%
175	Central African Republic	8.9%
176	Myanmar	8.3%
177	South Sudan	8.2%
178	Uganda	8.2%
179	India	8.0%
180	Nepal	7.7%
181	South Korea	7.5%
182	Sierra Leone	7.3%
183	Burkina Faso	7.0%
184	Malawi	6.7%
185	Chad	6.3%
186	Niger	6.0%
187	DR Congo	5.9%
188	Bangladesh	5.7%
189	Japan	5.2%
190	Rwanda	5.2%
191	Cambodia	4.9%
192	Burundi	4.7%
193	Eritrea	3.7%
194	Madagascar	4.1%
195	East Timor	3.3%
196	Ethiopia	2.5%
197	Vietnam	2.5%

== See also ==
- List of countries by body mass index
- Epidemiology of obesity
- Obesity in the Pacific
- Obesity
