= List of cloned animals =

== Banteng ==
- A Javan banteng calf was cloned from frozen cells using a cow as a surrogate, delivered via c-section on April 1, 2003, then hand raised at the San Diego Wild Animal Parks Infant Isolation Unit. It died due to an injury when it was less than seven years old, about half the normal life of a banteng.

== Black-footed ferret ==
Elizabeth Ann, the first cloned black ferret, being weighed on the 18th of February 2021 (at 70 days old)

Elizabeth Ann, a black-footed ferret female, was born on December 10, 2020, at the Fish and Wildlife Service's Black-footed Ferret Conservation Center in Colorado. She is a clone of a female named Willa, who died in the mid-1980s and left no living descendants.

== Brown rat ==
- Ralph (male, 2003)

== Camel ==
Injaz, a cloned female dromedary camel, was born in 2009 at the Camel Reproduction Center in Dubai, United Arab Emirates after an "uncomplicated" gestation of 378 days.

== Carp ==
Embryologist Tong Dizhou successfully inserted the DNA from a male Asian carp into the egg of a female Asian carp to create the first fish clone in 1963.

== Cat ==
- In 2001, scientists at Texas A&M University created the first cloned cat, CC (CopyCat). Even though CC was an exact copy of her host, they had different personalities; i.e., CC was shy and timid, while her host was playful and curious.
- In 2004, the first commercially cloned cat, Little Nicky, was created by Genetic Savings & Clone.
- In 2019, the first Chinese commercially cloned cat, Garlic, was created by Sinogene Biotechnology.

== Domestic cattle ==
- Gene, the first cloned calf in the world was born in 1997 at the American Breeders Service facilities in Deforest, Wisconsin, United States. Later it was transferred and kept at the Minnesota Zoo Education Center. Three more cloned calves were born in 1998.
- A Holstein heifer named Daisy was cloned by Dr. Xiangzhong (Jerry) Yang using ear skin cells from a high-merit cow named Aspen at the University of Connecticut in 1999, followed by three additional clones, Amy, Betty, and Cathy in 1999.
- Second Chance, a Brahman bull, was cloned from Chance, a beloved celebrity bull. Second Chance was born in August, 1999 at Texas A&M University. While Chance was exceptionally gentle and affectionate, Second Chance was dangerously aggressive.
- Starbuck II, a clone of Holstein breeding bull Hanoverhill Starbuck, was born by Caesarean section on 7 September 2000. It was one of the first animals cloned for commercial purposes.
- In 2000, Texas A&M University cloned a Black Angus bull named 86 Squared, after cells from his donor, Bull 86, had been frozen for 15 years. Both bulls exhibit a natural resistance to brucellosis, tuberculosis, and other diseases which can be transferred in meat.
- In 2001 researchers at Advanced Cell Technology in Worcester, Massachusetts, United States, reported that 24 successfully cloned Holsteins had been monitored from birth to the age of four. All maintained healthy stats comparable to control cattle and reached reproductive maturity at the sound stage. Two of these cloned cattle successfully mated, each producing a healthy calf.
- A purebred Hereford calf clone named Chloe was born in 2001 at Kansas State University's purebred research unit. This was Kansas State's first cloned calf.
- Millie and Emma were two female Jersey cows cloned at the University of Tennessee in 2001. They were the first calves to be produced using standard cell-culturing techniques.
- In 2001, Brazil cloned their first heifer, Vitória.
- Pampa, a Jersey calf, was the first animal cloned in Argentina (by the company Bio Sidus) in 2002.
- An Anatolian Grey bull (Efe) was cloned in Turkey in 2009 and four female calves from the same breed (Ece, Ecem, Nilüfer, Kiraz) in 2010 by the Scientific and Technological Research Council of Turkey (TÜBİTAK).
- In May 2010, Got became the first cloned Spanish Fighting Bull, cloned by Spanish scientists.
- In February 2011, Brazil cloned a brahman.
- A Boran cattle bull was cloned at the International Livestock Research Institute in Nairobi.
- In July 2016 scientists at the National University Toribio Rodríguez de Mendoza in Chachapoyas, Peru cloned a Jersey cattle by handmade cloning method using cells of an ear of a cow. The first Peruvian clone was called "Alma CL-01".

== Coyote ==
Sooam Biotech, Korea cloned eight coyotes in 2011 using domestic dogs as surrogate mothers.

== Deer ==
- A white-tailed deer named Dewey was born in 2003 at Texas A&M University.

== Dog ==
- Snuppy, an Afghan hound puppy, was the first dog to be cloned, in 2005 in South Korea.
- Sooam Biotech, South Korea, was reported in 2015 to have cloned 700 dogs for their owners, including two Yakutian Laika hunting dogs, which are seriously endangered due to crossbreeding. They also reportedly charged $100,000 for each cloned puppy. One puppy was cloned from the cells of a dog that had died 12 days before.
- Sinogene, a Beijing, China-based biotechnology company, was reported in December 2017 to have cloned Apple, a gene-edited dog, named "Longlong". In 2019, the first batch of monotocous cloned police dogs was born.
- Argentine president Javier Milei owns five English Mastiffs who are clones of his now-deceased dog Conan.

== Frog (tadpole) ==
In 1958, John Gurdon, then at Oxford University, explained that he had successfully cloned a frog. He did this by using intact nuclei from somatic cells from a Xenopus tadpole. This was an important extension of work of Briggs and King in 1952 on transplanting nuclei from embryonic blastula cells.

== Fruit flies ==
Five genetically identical fruit flies were produced at the lab of Dr. Vett Lloyd at Dalhousie University in Halifax, Nova Scotia, Canada in 2005.

== Gaur ==
Gaur, a species of wild cattle, was the first endangered species to be cloned. In 2001, at the Trans Ova Genetics in Sioux Center, Iowa, United States, a cloned gaur was born from a surrogate domestic cow mother. However, the calf died within 48 hours.

== Goat ==
- Downen TX 63 684 (nicknamed Megan) was cloned from a top producing Boer goat born in 2001 in Plainwell, Michigan.
- The first cloned goat in China was from adult ear skin, it was born at Yangling, Northwest A&F University.
- The Middle East's first and the world's fifth cloned goat, Hanna, was born at the Royan Institute in Isfahan, Iran in 2009. The cloned goat was developed in the surrogate uterus of the Bakhtiari goat. Iranian researchers were reported in 2009 to be planning to use cloned goats to eventually manufacture new medications such as antibodies and medicines for stroke victims.
- The world's first pashmina goat clone was produced at Centre of Animal Biotechnology at Sher-e-Kashmir University of Agricultural Sciences and Technology of Kashmir (SKUAST), Jammu and Kashmir, India. It was named Noori, an Arabic word referring to light. Funded by World Bank, this clone was a joint project of SKUAST and the Karnal-based National Dairy Research Institute.

== Horse ==
- In 2003, the world's first cloned horse, Prometea, was born.
- In 2006, Scamper, an extremely successful barrel racing horse, a gelding, was cloned. The resulting stallion, Clayton, became the first cloned horse to stand at stud in the U.S.
- In 2007, a renowned show jumper and Thoroughbred, Gem Twist, was cloned by Frank Chapot and his family. In September 2008, Gemini was born and several other clones followed, leading to the development of a breeding line from Gem Twist.
- In 2010, the first lived equine clone of a Criollo horse was born in Argentina and was the first horse clone produced in Latin America. In the same year a cloned polo horse was sold for $800,000 – the highest known price ever paid for a polo horse.
- In 2013, the world-famous polo star Adolfo Cambiaso helped his high-handicap team La Dolfina win the Argentine National Open, scoring nine goals in the 16-11 match. Two of those he scored atop a horse named Show Me—a clone, and the first to ride onto the Argentine pitch.
- On 6 August 2020, Kurt was born the world's first successfully cloned Przewalski's horse. In a collaboration between Viagen, San Diego Zoo Global (SDZG), and Revive & Restore, Kurt was cloned from a cell line of a genetically important stallion that had been cryopreserved at the SDZG Frozen Zoo since 1980.
- In June 2022, "Zhuang Zhuang" was cloned by the Beijing laboratory Sinogene. He is the first from the "warmblood" group of breeds to be born in China and to be officially approved by the China Horse Industry Association.
- On 17 February 2023, "Ollie" was the second successfully cloned Przewalski's horse. He is a genetic twin of Kurt, born from the same cell line.

== House mouse ==
- In 1986, the first mouse was cloned in the Soviet Union from an embryo cell.
- The first mouse from adult cells, Cumulina, was born in 1997 at the University of Hawaiʻi at Mānoa in the laboratory of Ryuzo Yanagimachi using the Honolulu technique.
- In 2008 Japanese scientists created a cloned mouse from a dead mouse that had been frozen for 16 years. This was the first time a mammal had been cloned from frozen cells.

== Monkey ==
=== Rhesus macaque ===
- Tetra (female, 1999) – embryo splitting (artificial twinning).
- Unnamed cloned embryos (2007) – transfer of DNA from adult cells.

In 2024 it was announced that a rhesus macaque named Retro had been cloned by a SCNT technique.

=== Crab-eating macaque ===
- Zhong Zhong and Hua Hua (female crab-eating macaques, 2017) – first successful cloning of primates using somatic cell nuclear transfer, the same method as Dolly, with the birth of two live female clones. Conducted in China in 2017.
- In January 2019, scientists in China reported the creation of five identical cloned gene-edited monkeys, using the same cloning technique that was used with Zhong Zhong and Hua Hua – the first ever cloned monkeys – and Dolly the sheep, and the same gene-editing Crispr-Cas9 technique allegedly used by He Jiankui in creating the first-ever gene-modified human babies Lulu and Nana. The monkey clones were made in order to study several medical diseases.

== Mouflon ==
- A European mouflon lamb was the first cloned endangered species to live past infancy. Cloned 2001.
- A cloned baby mouflon was born to a domestic sheep in the successful interspecies cloning of an endangered species in Iran in 2015.

== Mule ==
- Idaho Gem (male, 2003) was ranked third in the world among racing mules.

== Pig ==
- 5 Scottish piglets (Millie, Christa, Alexis, Carrel, and Dotcom) (2000)
- Xena (female, Meishan pig, 2000–2010)
- BGI, China was reported in 2014 to be producing 500 cloned pigs a year, with a success rate of 70–80%, to test new medicines.

== Pyrenean ibex ==
- A cloned Pyrenean ibex was born on July 30, 2003, in Spain, but died several minutes later due to physical defects in the lungs. This was the first extinct animal to be cloned.

== Rabbit ==
- In France (2003)

== Sheep ==
- The first cloned large mammal was a sheep by Steen Willadsen in 1984. However, the cloning was done from early embryonic cells, while the sheep Dolly in 1996 was cloned from an adult cell.
- Megan and Morag were sheep cloned from differentiated embryonic cells in 1995.
- Dolly (1996–2003), first cloned mammal from adult somatic cells. She had six lambs.
- Royana (2006–2010) cloned at the Royan Research Institute in Isfahan, Iran.
- Oyalı and Zarife were cloned in 2007 at Istanbul University in Istanbul, Turkey.

== Water buffalo ==
- Samrupa, the world's first Murrah buffalo (a type of water buffalo) calf cloned using a simple "Hand-guided cloning technique" was born in 2009 at National Dairy Research Institute (NDRI), Karnal, India, but died due to a lung infection five days after she was born. Garima-I, a buffalo calf cloned using an "Advanced Hand guided Cloning Technique" was born in 2009 at the NDRI. Two years later in 2011, she died of heart failure. Garima-II, another cloned calf was born in 2010. This buffalo was inseminated with frozen-thawed semen of a progeny-tested bull and gave birth to a female calf, Mahima in 2013. A cloned male buffalo calf Shresth was born in 2010 at the NDRI.
- In January 2016 scientists at the Central Institute for Research on Buffaloes in Hisar, India announced that they had cloned a buffalo using cells of the ventral side of the tail of superior buffalo.
- The world's first water buffalo was cloned in Guangxi, China by the Guangxi University in 2005 according to one reference.

== Wolf ==
- The arctic wolf was cloned by South Korean scientists, including the controversial scientist Hwang Woo-Suk in 2005. The two female cloned wolves were housed in a zoo in South Korea for public view. The wolves were called Snuwolf and Snuwolffy, which were names taken from Seoul National University. Snuwolf died in 2009 from an infection.
- Maya the wolf was cloned by the Chinese biotechnology company Sinogene in 2022.

== See also ==
- Commercial animal cloning
- Human cloning
