= Commercial animal cloning =

Commercial cloning of animals

Commercial animal cloning is the cloning of animals for commercial purposes, including animal husbandry, medical research, competition camels and horses, detection dog cloning, and restoring populations of endangered and extinct animals. The practice was first demonstrated in 1996 with Dolly the sheep.

== Cloning methods ==
Moving or copying all (or nearly all) genes from one animal to form a second, genetically nearly identical, animal is usually done using one of three methods: the Roslin technique, the Honolulu technique, or Artificial Twinning. The first two of these involve a process known as somatic cell nuclear transfer. In this process, an oocyte is taken from a surrogate mother and undergoes enucleation, a process that removes the nucleus from inside the oocyte. Somatic cells are then taken from the animal that is being cloned, transferred into the blank oocyte in order to provide genetic material, and fused with the oocyte using an electrical current. The oocyte is then activated and re-inserted into the surrogate mother. The result is the formation of an animal that is almost genetically identical to the animal the somatic cells were taken from. While somatic cell nuclear transfer was previously believed to only work using genetic material from somatic cells that were unfrozen or were frozen with cryoprotectant (to avoid cell damage caused by freezing), successful dog cloning in various breeds has now been shown using somatic cells from unprotected specimens that had been frozen for up to four days. The third method of cloning involves embryo splitting, the process of taking the blastomeres from a very early animal embryo and separating them before they become differentiated in order to create two or more separate organisms. When using embryo splitting, cloning must occur before the birth of the animal, and clones grow up at the same time (in a similar fashion to monozygotic twins).

== Livestock cloning ==
The US Food and Drug Administration has concluded that "Food from cattle, swine, and goat clones is as safe to eat as food from any other cattle, swine, or goat." It has also been noted that the main use of agricultural clones is to produce breeding stock, not food. Clones allow farmers to upgrade the overall quality of their herds by producing more copies of the best animals in the herd. These animals are then used for conventional breeding, and the sexually reproduced offspring become the food producing animals. The goals of cloning listed by the FDA include "disease resistance ... suitability to climate ... quality body type .. fertility ... and market preference (leanness, tenderness, color, size of various cuts, etc.)" Milk productivity is another desirable trait that cloning is used for, including in the case of cloned "supercows".

== Medical uses ==
The medical uses for animal cloning range from creating animal models of illnesses, generating organs for transplantation, and genetically modifying animals to make pharmaceuticals. Scientists can produce genetically identical animals through cloning, which can improve illness models and test possible cures. Researchers can learn more about the underlying causes of diseases by examining cloned animals with certain genetic abnormalities. Novel medications and treatments can be tested for safety and effectiveness in cloned animal models before being used on people.

Cloned animals have been used to model diseases like cancer, diabetes, and cystic fibrosis, and pigs have been used to examine spinal cord healing. The creation of genetically altered animals with organs transplanted into humans may be made possible by cloning. The severe lack of donor organs for transplantation may be alleviated by this. Organs from cloned pigs have been transplanted into human patients. On March 21, 2024 the first Massachusetts General Hospital announced the success transplant of a genetically-edited pig kidney into a man with end-stage kidney disease. The pig kidney, provided by eGenesis in Cambridge Massachusetts, was edited using the CRISPR_Cas technology to remove any harmful genes from the pig and add human genes to make it more compatible with the human body.

== Other working animals with high performance ==
Cloning of super sniffer dogs for airports was reported in 2011, four years after the dog that served as their genetic donor retired. Cloning of a successful rescue dog was reported in 2009 and of a police dog in 2019.

== Endangered and extinct animals ==
The only extinct animal to be cloned as of 2022 is a Pyrenean ibex, born on July 30, 2003, in Spain, which died minutes later due to physical defects in the lungs.

Some animals have been cloned to add genetic diversity to endangered species with small remaining populations, thereby avoiding inbreeding depression. Centers performing this include Viagen, aided by the San Diego Frozen Zoo, and Revive & Restore. This is also referred to as "conservation cloning". Two examples are the black-footed ferret and Przewalski's horse.

In 2022, the world's first cloned Arctic wolf "Maya" was born in Beijing by Sinogene. Although Arctic wolves are no longer listed by the IUCN Red List as an endangered species, the technique can be used to help other animals at risk of extinction, such as Mexican gray wolves and red wolves. The team of Sinogene plans to restore lost species or boost numbers in endangered animal populations.

In 2023, the world's second successfully cloned endangered Przewalski's horse "Ollie" arrived at his new home at the San Diego Zoo. Originally born at Viagen Pets & Equine cloning facility in Texas, Ollie was the clone of a male Przewalski's horse stallion whose cell line was cryopreserved over 40 years ago by the San Diego Zoo Wildlife Alliance Biodiversity Bank’s Frozen Zoo. Kurt, the world's first cloned Przewalski's horse, lives in the San Diego Safari Park, he was born in 2020 from the same cell line that Ollie was cloned from. Przewalski's horses have gone from being nearly extinct to surviving in zoos for the past 40 years. Wildlife care experts are working with the cloned Przewalski's horses to ensure they gain the behaviors needed to interact and thrive with other Prezewalski's horses before introducing them to other horses.

In a recent study using sturgeons, scientists have made improvements to a technique known as somatic nuclear cell transfer, with the ultimate goal being to save endangered species. Sturgeons are endangered due to the high levels of poaching, increased destruction to habitats, water pollution, and overfishing. The somatic nuclear cell transfer technique is a well-known cloning method that has been used for years but focuses on species that are thriving rather than endangered or extinct species. This technique usually uses a single somatic donor cell with a single manipulation and inserts it into a recipient egg of the species of interest. It has recently been found that the position by which that somatic cell is located inside the recipient is very important in order to successfully clone a species. By making adjustments to the original method of using a single somatic cell and instead use multiple somatic donor cells to insert into the recipient egg, the likeliness of the somatic donor cells being in the crucial position on the egg will increase tremendously. This increase will then result in higher success rates with cloning. There is ongoing research using this improved method, but from the data collected thus far, it seems to be a reasonable method to continue and soon be able to help stop species like the sturgeons from becoming endangered and possibly stop extinction from occurring.

Cloning long-extinct animals using current methods is impossible because DNA begins to denature after death, meaning the entire genome of an extinct species is not available to be reproduced. However, new studies using genome editing have suggested it may be possible to "bring back" traits of extinct species by incorporating genes from the extinct species into the genome of a closely related living organism. Currently, George Church's lab at Harvard University's Wyss Institute is conducting research into genetically modifying Asian elephants to express genes from the extinct woolly mammoth. Their goals in doing this are to expand the habitat available to Asian elephants and reestablish the ecological interactions woolly mammoths played a role in prior to their extinction.

== History and commercialization ==
Viagen began by offering cloning to the livestock and equine industry in 2003, and later as ViaGen Pets included cloning of cats and dogs in 2016. Viagen's subsidiary, start licensing, owns a cloning patent which is licensed to their only competitor as of 2018, who also offers animal cloning services. (Viagen is a subsidiary of Precigen.)

The first commercially cloned pet was a cat named Little Nicky, produced in 2004 by Genetic Savings & Clone for a north Texas woman for the fee of US$50,000. On May 21, 2008, BioArts International announced a limited commercial dog cloning service (through a program it called Best Friends Again) in partnership with a Korean company named Sooam Biotech. This program came after the announcement of the successful cloning of a family dog named Missy, an achievement widely publicized in the Missyplicity Project. In September 2009, BioArts announced the end of its dog cloning service. In July 2008, the Seoul National University (co-parents of Snuppy, reputedly the world's first cloned dog in 2005) created five clones of a dog named Booger for its Californian owner. The woman paid $50,000 for this service.

Sooam Biotech continued developing proprietary techniques for cloning dogs based on a licence from Viagen's subsidiary, stART Licensing (which owned the original patent for the process of animal cloning). (Although the animal itself is not patentable, the process is protected by a patent). Sooam created cloned puppies for owners whose dogs had died, charging $100,000 per clone. Sooam Biotech was reported to have cloned approximately 700 dogs by 2015 and to be producing 500 cloned embryos of various breeds a day in 2016. In 2015, the longest period after which Sooam Biotech could clone a puppy was 12 days from the death of the original pet dog. Sinogene Biotechnology created the first Chinese clone dog in 2017 before commercializing the cloning service and joining in the pet cloning market. In 2019, Sinogene successfully created the first Chinese cloned cat. In June 2022, "Zhuang Zhuang" was cloned by the Beijing laboratory Sinogene. He is the first from the "warmblood" group of breeds to be born in China and to be officially approved by the China Horse Industry Association.

== Controversies ==
=== Animal welfare ===
The mortality rate for cloned animals is higher than for those born of natural processes. This includes a discrepancy pre-birth, during birth, and after birth in survival rates and quality of life, leading to ethical concerns. Many of these discrepancies are thought to come from maternal mRNA already present in the oocyte prior to the transfer of genetic material as well as from DNA methylation, both of which contribute to the development of the animal in the womb of the surrogate. Some common issues seen with cloned animals are shortened telomeres, the repetitive end sequences of DNA whose decreasing length over the lifespan of an organism have been associated with aging; large offspring syndrome, the abnormal size of cloned individuals due to epigenetic (gene expression) changes; and methylation patterns of genetic material that are so abnormal compared to standard embryos of the species being cloned as to be incompatible with life.

=== Pet cloning ===
While pet cloning is sometimes advertised as a prospective method for re-gaining a deceased companionship animal, pet cloning does not result in animals that are exactly like the previous pet (in looks or personality). Although the animal in question is cloned, there are still phenotypical differences that may affect its appearance or health. This issue was brought to light in the cloning of a cat named Rainbow. Rainbow's clone, later named CC, was genetically identical to Rainbow, yet CC's coloring patterns were not the same due to the development of the kitten inside the womb as well as random genetic disparities in the clone such as variable X-chromosome inactivation.

Despite its controversies, the study of pet cloning holds the potential to contribute to scientific, veterinary, and medical knowledge, and it is a potential resource in efforts to preserve endangered cousins of the cat and dog.

In 2005, California Assembly Member Lloyd Levine introduced a bill to ban the sale or transfer of pet clones in California. That bill was voted down.

== See also ==
- Biobank
- Cultivar: term used in botany to refer to specific breeds (made using selective cross breeding and sometimes genetic modification) that have distinct properties. Often reproduced using cloning to avoid properties being lost due to sexual propagation.
- List of animals that have been cloned
- Working animal
