= Polly and Molly =

Pair of cloned sheep

Polly and Molly (born 1997), two ewes, were the first mammals to have been successfully cloned from an adult somatic cell and to be transgenic animals at the same time. This is not to be confused with Dolly the Sheep, the first animal to be successfully cloned from an adult somatic cell where there wasn’t modification carried out on the adult donor nucleus. Polly and Molly, like Dolly the Sheep, were cloned at the Roslin Institute in Edinburgh, Scotland.

The creation of Polly and Molly built on the somatic nuclear transfer experiments that led to the cloning of Dolly the Sheep. The crucial difference was that in creating Polly and Molly, scientists used cells into which a new gene had been inserted. The gene chosen was a therapeutic protein to demonstrate the potential of such recombinant DNA technology combined with animal cloning. This could hopefully be used to produce pharmacological and therapeutic proteins to treat human diseases. The protein in question was the human blood clotting factor IX. Another difference from Dolly the Sheep was the source cell type of the nucleus that was transferred. Although Polly and Molly were nuclear clones, they had different mtDNA that was different from the nuclear cells where they received their DNA.

Prior to the production of Polly and Molly, the only demonstrated way to make a transgenic animal was by microinjection of DNA into the pronuclei of fertilized oocytes (eggs). However, only a small proportion of the animals will integrate the injected DNA into their genome. In the rare cases that they do integrate this new genetic information, the pattern of expression of the injected transgene's protein due to the random integration is very variable. As the aim of such research is to produce an animal that expresses a particular protein in high levels in, for example, its milk, microinjection is a very costly procedure that does not usually produce the desired animal.

In mice, there is an additional option for genetic transfer that is not available in other animals. Embryonic stem cells provide a means to transfer new DNA into the germline. They also allow precise genetic modifications by gene targeting. Modified embryonic stem cells can be selected in vitro before the experiment moves on further for the production of an animal. Embryonic stem cells capable of contributing to the germline of livestock species such as sheep have not been isolated.

The production of Dolly the Sheep and also Megan and Morag, the two sheep that led to the production of Dolly, demonstrated that viable sheep can be produced by nuclear transfer from a variety of somatic cell types which have been cultured in vitro. Polly and Molly represented the further step in which somatic cells were cultured in vitro, just as in the case with the previous sheep. However, in this case they were transfected with foreign DNA, and the transfected cells which stably integrated this new piece of genetic information were selected. The nuclei of these somatic cells was then transferred into an empty oocyte, as in the procedure of nuclear transfer, and this was used to produce several transgenic animals. A cell type PDFF was used. PDFF5 would produce male animals and were not transduced. Cell type PDFF2 produced female animals and were transduced. Of the gestations that occurred, three PDFF2 animals were born, two of which survived birth, 7LL8 and 7LL12. These animals were transfected but contained a marker gene not the cloned gene of interest. These were named "Holly" and "Olly". Two more subsets of female-producing PDFF2 cells, PDFF2-12 and PDFF2-13, also produced animals which had the cell of interest together with the marker. Of these lambs, 7LL12, 7LL15, and 7LL13 were born alive and healthy. Two of these were named Polly and Molly.

== Transgene ==
The transgene that was inserted in the donor somatic cells was designed to express the human clotting factor IX protein in the milk of sheep. This protein plays an essential role in blood coagulation, and deficiency leads to the disease haemophilia B of which treatment requires intravenous infusion of factor IX. The production of this protein in livestock milk, a process known as pharming, would provide a source of this therapeutic protein that would reduce the cost and also would be free of potential infectious risk associated with the current source of this protein (human blood).
