= John Sperling =

American businessman (1921–2014)

John Glen Sperling (January 9, 1921 – August 22, 2014) was an American billionaire businessman who is credited with having led the contemporary for-profit education movement in the United States The fortune he amassed was based on his founding of the for-profit University of Phoenix in 1976, which became part of the publicly traded Apollo Group. Sperling brought the business model of higher education to the forefront, a model that employed the scientific management of higher education to the forefront: diminishing the power and importance of labor, increasing the importance of technology, marketing and advertising, and as University of Phoenix cofounder John D. Murphy explained, maximizing profit. For ventures ranging from pet cloning to green energy, he has widely been described as an "eccentric" self-made man by The Washington Post and other media.

== Early life and education ==
Sperling was born to a poor sharecropper family in the Missouri Ozarks. His father worked for the railroad and his mother was a fundamentalist Christian. He spent several years as a sailor in the merchant marine, and even as a wandering 1950s beatnik. He received his undergraduate education at Reed College, Portland, Oregon, a master's degree from the University of California, Berkeley under the G.I. Bill, and then went on to read for a PhD in economic history at King's College, Cambridge. His doctorate thesis examined 18th-century English mercantile history.

== Entrepreneurship ==
=== Apollo Group ===
Apollo Group (Nasdaq: APOL) was an S&P 500 corporation based in the South Phoenix area of Phoenix, Arizona. Apollo Group, Inc., through its subsidiaries, owned several for-profit educational institutions before it was acquired by Apollo Global Management and two other companies.

Apollo was founded by John Sperling in 1973. Sperling founded the University of Phoenix in his 50s with no investors and no track record in businesses while facing what he described in his biography as "mean-spirited" opposition from accreditation agencies, competitors, and the press.

The company owned and operated four higher-learning institutions: the University of Phoenix, Western International University, Axia College, the College for Financial Planning, the Institute for Professional Development. It also owned Insight Schools (Online Public High Schools for Washington, Wisconsin, and other locations), and Olympus High School. As of November 2005, the combined enrollment of the four U.S. domestic universities (UOPX, WIU, Axia, CFFP) was approximately 315,350 students. Of these, nearly 90% attended the University of Phoenix, which Apollo Group described as "the nation’s largest regionally accredited private university".

Additionally, Apollo Group, Inc. was the owner of BPP University in the United Kingdom. It joined forces with Carlyle Group to create Apollo Global for investing in education abroad. Apollo Global also purchased UNIACC college in Santiago, Chile and ULA college in Mexico.

=== University of Phoenix ===
The University of Phoenix is a for-profit institution of higher learning. It was a wholly owned subsidiary of Apollo Group Inc. which was a publicly traded (Nasdaq: APOL) S&P 500 corporation based in Phoenix, Arizona. The University of Phoenix was founded by John Sperling, who felt that "working adult students were often invisible on traditional campuses and treated as second-class citizens." Sperling is also quoted as saying "We are not trying to develop [students'] value systems or go in for that 'expand their minds' bullshit." In 1976, it began in Phoenix, with the first class consisted of eight students. In 1980, the school expanded to San Jose, California, and in 1989, the university launched its online program.

The school formerly had an enrollment of 420,700 undergraduate students and 78,000 graduate students, or 224,880 full-time equivalent students. The university had more than 200 campuses worldwide and conferred degrees in over 100 degree programs at the associate, bachelor's, master's and doctoral levels. University of Phoenix has an open enrollment admission policy, requiring only a high-school diploma, GED, or its equivalent. The school also provides associate or bachelor's degree applicants opportunity for advanced placement through its prior learning assessment, which, aside from previous coursework, college credit can come from experiential learning essays, corporate training, and certificates or licenses.

== Activism ==
Before becoming an entrepreneur at age 53, Sperling was a tenured professor at San Jose State University. He was an activist for several liberal causes during the 1960s, such as building a powerful new California faculty union, and was part of several conflicts with authorities and university leaders regarding his experimental adult education schemes.

John Sperling was also an opponent of drug prohibition and was financing initiatives to decriminalize medical marijuana in the United States. According to Time magazine, Sperling used marijuana to combat pain caused by the cancer he fought during the 1960s. Together with George Soros, and Peter Lewis of Progressive Insurance, Sperling raised considerable amounts of money for drug and other related causes, especially during the 2004 presidential campaign.

== Bio-medical projects ==
=== Longevity research ===
Sperling directed significant amounts of his attention and financial resources toward extending the life span of human beings—research into life extension technology or "biological immortality". Wired magazine reported in their February 2004 article "John Sperling Wants You to Live Forever" that his fortune was quickly approaching US$3 billion, and that he had plans to donate it to human biology research if and when he died. It was to be the biggest private program ever devoted to human biology. Sperling since indicated that his fortune would go primarily to environmental causes.

=== Cloning ===
Sperling provided financing to Genetic Savings & Clone (GS&C), of Sausalito, California, which closed in 2006. He spent seven years and $20 million trying to clone a dog named Missy in a project called Missyplicity. Clones of Missy were produced in December 2007. A subproject of Missyplicity was called Operation CopyCat, which successfully created the first cat clone, named CC.

== Writing ==
=== For-profit Higher Education ===
In 1997 Sperling and Robert W Tucker published a book, For-profit Higher Education: Developing a World-class Workforce.

Most of the content of this book was derived from a series of internal position papers written by Sperling & Tucker (Tucker was a Senior Vice President). The papers, some 47 in all, were written from 1992 through 1997 to guide the development of the institution to serve the adult-centered market effectively.

Perhaps the most controversial argument made in this book was its analysis of taxpayer costs associated to the three basic models of higher education: public, private (non-profit), and private (for-profit). By accounting not only for direct taxpayer funding associated to the three models, but also for government support to non-profits and, especially, forgone revenue in the non-profit models (including: taxes on endowments; property, sales, use, taxes; federal and state taxes on profit or surplus revenue), Sperling & Tucker's model showed that taxpayers realized a profit of several hundred dollars per student per year from a successful for-profit university. The model also showed that taxpayers underwrite costs amounting to several thousand dollars per student per year for students attending public and non-profit institutions. Sperling & Tucker's model showed that taxpayers underwrite the highest dollar value for students attending a small number of highly elite institutions, largely because of their very large tax-free endowments.

There are criticisms of Sperling & Tucker's economic and financial arguments. At the time this book was published, the student loan default rate for University of Phoenix students was at or below the average for state 4-year institutions. This parity eliminated loan default costs as a significant factor in the analysis. (Although the model included default rates by institution.) Today, the default rate for-profit institutions is above the average for public and non-profit institutions, leading critics to argue that the difference in the level of taxpayer support required under the three models is not so large and perhaps does not exist. Considerable disagreement centers on this point. Some of the disagreement rests on which economic and financial variables to consider in the taxpayer cost equation; some disagreement rests on uncertainties and disputes surrounding true taxpayer costs in loan defaults.

Other themes in the 1997 book include an argument that regional accrediting bodies play an inconsistent and restrictive role in innovation and an overview of the integrated assessment, academic decision-support, and quality management system developed and implemented by Tucker.

=== Rebel with a Cause ===
In 2000, Sperling published an autobiography called Rebel with a Cause.

After reviewing Sperling's autobiography Alex Lightman wrote, "Sperling's unflinching honesty in recounting his childhood of poverty and illiteracy in the Ozarks; his battles over academic accreditation and 'the war on drugs;' his investments in cloning, anti-aging, and in crops that can grow amidst salt and sand; and, especially, his founding of a big, profitable public university that will probably generate more MBA holders than any other, all add up to a CEO whose life will echo, even thunder, for decades to come." Lightman also wrote, "Las Vegas bookies probably would have given Sperling 100-to-1 odds against his business, but he not only survived, he grew the Apollo Group--parent of University of Phoenix and related interests--into a public company with a market capitalization (as of May 2001) of almost $7 billion, making it roughly as successful as many vastly more publicized dot-com champions." Expressing his final opinion of the book Lightman wrote, "A book Like Rebel with a Cause is dangerous, because it sets new CEO standards for both searing self-reflection and for what constitutes success."

=== The Great Divide: Retro vs. Metro America ===
In August 2004, he co-authored The Great Divide: Retro vs. Metro America, released by his newly created publishing firm, PoliPoint Press. It was a sociological treatise attempting to explain the Red America/Blue America cultural and political divisions of the United States.

Despite a $2 million advertising campaign, the book was not widely embraced by its intended progressive audience. Thomas Frank, author of What's The Matter With Kansas?, ridiculed Sperling's view of American society:

One America, to judge from the book's illustrations, works with lovable robots and lives in 'vibrant' cities with ballet troupes, super-creative Frank Gehry buildings and quiet, tasteful religious ritual; the other relies on contemptible extraction industries (oil, gas and coal) and inhabits a world of white supremacy and monster truck shows and religious ceremonies in which beefy men in cheap clothes scream incomprehensibly at one another.

The book, however, did succeed in causing controversy in conservative media. Gary Gregg of National Review Online called the book the work of a "metropolitan elite who disdain the cultures and values of middle America." R. Albert Mohler, Jr., president of The Southern Baptist Theological Seminary in Louisville, Kentucky, called it a work of "hate, cultural condescension, and bizarre proposals backed up with hare-brained analysis."

The Great Divide is a blueprint for the Democratic Party to control the presidency and both houses of congress. Sperling and his co-authors claim that the United States has seldom been truly united and that there currently exists such a wide gap that the country is effectively two nations: "one traditional and rooted in the past, and one modern and focused on the future." Sperling and his co-authors say these two nations are divided along racial, ethnic, religious, cultural, political, and geographic lines. They claim that political conflict in American is not really about left-wing or right-wing ideology but about the differences between what they call Metro America and Retro America; Metro America consists of the two coasts and the Great Lakes states. The authors argue that neither the Republicans nor the Democrats are national parties, so there is no point in behaving as such. They recommend that the Democrats concede the Retro states and focus entirely on the Metro states. This would allow the party to develop a coherent message that would connect with voters and to take advantage of the fact that Metro states account for 65 percent of the population. Then, once a strong base is built, the Democrats can work on unifying America.

== Works authored ==
- Sperling, John (2000). Rebel with a Cause. J. Wiley. ISBN 9780471326045.
- Sperling, John; Tucker, Robert W (1997). For-profit Higher Education: Developing a World-class Workforce.
- Sperling, John; Suzanne Helburn; Samuel George; John Morris; Carl Hunt (August 2004). The Great Divide: Retro vs. Metro America. PoliPoint Press. ISBN 9780976062103.
- Sperling, John G. (1962). The South Sea Company: an historical essay and bibliographical finding list.

== Personal life ==
Sperling was married and divorced twice. He had one son, Peter Sperling, who took over his role as chairman of the Apollo Education Group for some time, and two grandchildren at the time of his death.

Sperling's close friendship with Nancy Pelosi was documented in the book Degrees of Inequality.

== See also ==
- For-profit higher education in the United States
- Futures studies
- Longevity
