= Missyplicity =

Dog cloning project

- Species: Canis lupus familiaris

The Missyplicity Project was a project devoted to cloning Joan Hawthorne and John Sperling's dog, a Border Collie and husky mix. Missy died on July 6, 2002, at the age of 15.

== History ==
In 1997, news that Dolly the sheep had been cloned inspired the couple to find out whether their dog Missy could also be cloned. In 1998, a multimillion-dollar project was launched to clone Missy, trading as "Genetic Savings & Clone". Missy died in 2002 before efforts to clone her had succeeded, but her DNA was gene banked for future cloning efforts.

One of the key scientists on the Missyplicity Project and Genetic Savings & Clone was Dr. Taeyoung Shin, who was born and completed his Ph.D. in South Korea before moving to the United States. After both The Missyplicity Project and GSC proved unable to clone dogs, Dr. Shin's Ph.D. thesis advisor, Dr. Hwang Woo-Suk, led a team of research scientists at Seoul National University in a major dog cloning effort. This project was designed to overcome the specific obstacles encountered by both the Missyplicity and GSC teams.

In 2005, Dr. Hwang and his team successfully cloned the world's first dog, which they named Snuppy. In 2007, Lou Hawthorne, former CEO of GSC and current CEO of BioArts International, was introduced to Dr. Hwang and his team by Dr. Shin of BioArts, and asked if they would clone Missy. They agreed and Missy's conserved cells were flown to the Sooam Biotech Research Foundation outside of Seoul.

The scientists at Sooam, led by Dr. Hwang, used Missy's cells to successfully produce three Missy clones. After 10 years of research and effort, the quest to clone Missy had finally succeeded. Three identical clones of Missy were returned to the original owners. The clones are named Mira (after a Korean myth of an all-powerful benevolent dragon), Chingu (which means "friend" in Korean) and Sarang ("love").

Mira, born December 5, 2007, was the world's first clone of a family dog and bore a striking physical and behavioral resemblance to the original Missy. Chingu and Sarang were born on February 15 and 19. They were flown to the United States on April 18, where they joined their genetic sister Mira.

== Related projects ==
The news of the project to clone Missy spread quickly, and many people contacted Hawthorne and Sperling wanting to gene bank and clone their own pets. In response to this demand, several members of the Missyplicity Project founded Genetic Savings & Clone (GSC) in February 2000.

Operation CopyCat was a branch of the Missyplicity Project that concentrated on cloning cats, after the discovery that dog genes are harder to copy than cat genes. Operation CopyCat announced that on December 22, 2001, CopyCat was born of the Missyplicity Project. She was called CC for short, and was born at the Texas A&M, College of Veterinary Medicine.

BioArts and Sooam decided to partner to offer a limited number of cloning spots to the public through a program called "Best Friends Again" in 2008. In 2009, Lou Hawthorne the CEO of BioArts announced he was withdrawing from the program due to the small market, unethical competition, weak intellectual property protection, unscalable bioethics and unpredictable results. However Sooam Biotech continued developing proprietary techniques based on a licence from ViaGen's subsidiary Start Licensing (which owns the original Dolly patent) and continued creating cloned dogs for owners whose dogs had died, charging $100,000 a time. Sooam Biotech was reported to have cloned 700 dogs by 2015, a cloning success rate of 40% and to be producing 500 cloned embryos of various species a day in 2016.

== See also ==
- Pet cloning
