= Supercow =

Supercow may refer to:

- Supercow (dairy), a high-producing dairy cow
- Supercow (cartoon), the superhero alter-ego of Cow from Cow and Chicken
- Supercow (mascot), the mascot of the Schulich School of Engineering
- Supercow (video game), video game
