= Megan and Morag =

Domestic sheep: first mammals cloned from differentiated cells

Megan and Morag, two domestic sheep, were the first mammals to have been successfully cloned from differentiated cells. They are not to be confused with Dolly the sheep which was the first animal to be successfully cloned from an adult somatic cell or Polly the sheep which was the first cloned and transgenic animal. Megan and Morag, like Dolly and Polly, were cloned at the Roslin Institute in Edinburgh, Scotland in 1995.

== Background ==
The team at the Roslin Institute were seeking a way to modify the genetic constitution of sheep and cattle more effectively than the hit and miss method that was the only method and had sort of aids available at the time – microinjection. In microinjection, DNA is injected into the pronuclei of fertilized oocytes. However, only a small proportion of the animals will integrate the injected DNA into their genome and in the rare cases that they do integrate this new genetic information, the pattern of expression of the injected piece of DNA's gene, due to the random integration, is very variable.

The team choose to combine two approaches – microinjection and embryonic stem cells. In order to achieve this they decided to try to transfer the nucleus from one cell to another and stimulate this new cell to grow and become an animal, a process known as nuclear transfer. The team at the Roslin Institute tried to make immortalized and undifferentiated embryonic stem cell lines in sheep, but failed. As a result, they decided to work with cultured blastocyst cells. The nuclear material of these blastocyst cells would be transferred into an unfertilized sheep egg cell, an oocyte where the nucleus had been removed. To optimize the chances of successful nuclear transfer, they put the cultured cells into a state of quiescence, which was a similar state to that of the unfertilized egg cell.

Nuclear transfer was done, using electrical stimuli both to fuse the cultured cell with the enucleated egg and to kick start embryonic development. From 244 nuclear transfers, 34 developed to a stage where they could be placed in the uteri of surrogate mothers. In the summer of 1995, five lambs were born, of which two – Megan and Morag – survived to become healthy fertile adults. These were the first mammals cloned from differentiated cells. They were born with the names 5LL2 and 5LL5 in June 1995.

The production of Megan and Morag demonstrated that viable sheep can be produced by nuclear transfer from cells which have been cultured in vitro. They signified the technical breakthrough that made Dolly the sheep possible. The birth of Megan and Morag, a year before Dolly, with their huge beneficial potential, made relatively few headlines. As of 2005, Megan was still alive and was the oldest cloned animal at the time.

== See also ==
- List of cloned animals
