= Toppy =

Seven cloned Labrador Retriever dogs (born 2007)

- Species: Canis lupus familiaris
- Breed: Labrador retriever
- Sex: Male
- Born: 2007; Seoul National University, Seoul, South Korea
- Occupation: Detection dogs
- Known for: First cloned sniffer dogs

Toppy is the name given to seven cloned Labrador Retriever dogs, born in late 2007 to three surrogate mothers. They were the world's first cloned working dogs, and were used by the Korea Customs Service.

Each Toppy is a clone of a successful sniffer dog in Canada. The Toppy dogs needed 16 months of training to qualify to work for the South Korean Customs Service. Only 10-15% of dogs are genetically predisposed to being effective detection dogs.

The project cost ₩300 million (about US$240,000), and was funded by the Government of South Korea. It was led by Lee Byeong-chun, a former aide to Hwang Woo-suk, who fell from grace after his stem cell research turned out to be fabricated.

== Background ==
In 2005, a team of researchers at Seoul National University (SNU) created the world's first cloned dog, Snuppy. The claim was initially met with skepticism, as a member of the team, Hwang Woo-suk, was found to have lied about his stem cell research. An independent investigation, however, proved that the cloning had, in fact, taken place.

In 2008, the year that the Toppys were announced to the public, only 3 in 10 dogs trained as sniffers passed training. This inspired the Animal Genetic Resource Preservation and Clone project, a plan to create a more effective sniffing dog for a cheaper cost, to be achieved by cloning a sniffer dog. SNU partnered with the stem cell firm RNL Bio for the project, and selected as its leader Lee Byeong-chun, a former assistant to the disgraced Hwang, who had also been on the team that cloned Snuppy. The project cost 300 million South Korean won, funded by the state.

== Toppy ==
All seven Toppys were cloned from Chase, a Canadian sniffer dog. Chase's cells were collected via skin biopsy, put in dog eggs, and implanted in nine surrogate mothers. Only three became pregnant. A total of nine live puppies, plus one stillborn puppy, resulted; one puppy died after birth, bringing the total number of clones to seven. The clones were all named "Toppy", a portmanteau of the words "tomorrow" and "puppy".

The seven Toppys were announced to the public in 2008, along with the intent to train them as sniffers. One Toppy fractured his leg and was removed from the training program. The other six completed their sixteen-month training and became sniffer dogs in 2009. Three of the dogs were deployed at Incheon International Airport, and the other three at customs offices in Incheon, Gimpo, and Daegu, respectively. Their trainer, Kim Nak-seung, said that the clones "have a superior nature" compared to non-clones.

== Legacy ==
In 2019, over a decade after the birth of the Toppys, it was reported that 42 of South Korea's 51 sniffer dogs (80% of total sniffer dogs) were clones. Of the 42 clones, 39 were deployed at Incheon International Airport, where three of the Toppys worked. The practice of using cloned dogs for similar duties, such as police work, has been adopted by countries such as China.

A 2018 study on cloned working dogs found that, while cloned dogs have heavier birthweights, these clones are otherwise healthy by metrics like posture and reaction time. They were also found to have better aptitudes than non-clones. Nonetheless, cloning remains controversial. A 2008 joint statement by Humane World for Animals and the American Anti-Vivisection Society, which mentioned the Toppys as an example, condemned the cloning of animals for any purpose. This opposition is based on the treatment of animals such surrogates, the alleged health problems of clones, and the unknown fate of cloned dogs which do not pass assessments and can thus not be used for their intended purpose.

== See also ==
- Snuppy
- Hwang Woo-suk
- Trakr, a 9/11 rescue dog who was cloned after his death
