= Ethics of cloning =

Variety of ethical positions

In bioethics, the ethics of cloning concerns the ethical positions on the practice and possibilities of cloning, especially of humans. While many of these views are religious in origin, some of the questions raised are faced by secular perspectives as well. Perspectives on human cloning are theoretical, as human therapeutic and reproductive cloning are not commercially used; animals are currently cloned in laboratories and in livestock production.

Advocates support the development of therapeutic cloning in order to generate tissues and whole organs to treat patients who otherwise cannot obtain transplants, to avoid the need for immunosuppressive drugs, and to stave off the effects of aging. Advocates for reproductive cloning believe that parents who cannot otherwise procreate should have access to technology.

Opponents of cloning have concerns that technology is not yet developed enough to be safe, and that it could be prone to abuse, either in the form of clones raised as slaves, or leading to the generation of humans from whom organs and tissues would be harvested. Opponents have also raised concerns about how cloned individuals could integrate with families and with society at large.

Religious groups are divided, with some opposing the technology as usurping God's place and, to the extent embryos are used, destroying a human life; others support therapeutic cloning's potential life-saving benefits.

Cloning of animals is opposed by animal-groups due to the number of cloned animals that suffer from malformations before they die, and while meat of cloned animals has been approved by the US FDA, its use is opposed by some other groups concerned about food safety.

== Philosophical debate ==
The various forms of cloning, particularly human cloning, are controversial. There have been numerous demands for all progress in the human cloning field to be halted. Most scientific, governmental and religious organizations oppose reproductive cloning. The American Association for the Advancement of Science (AAAS) and other scientific organizations have made public statements suggesting that human reproductive cloning be banned until safety issues are resolved. Serious ethical concerns have been raised by the future possibility of harvesting organs from clones.

Advocates of human therapeutic cloning believe the practice could provide genetically identical cells for regenerative medicine, and tissues and organs for transplantation. Such cells, tissues, and organs would neither trigger an immune response nor require the use of immunosuppressive drugs. Both basic research and therapeutic development for serious diseases such as cancer, heart disease, and diabetes, as well as improvements in burn treatment and reconstructive and cosmetic surgery, are areas that might benefit from such new technology. One bioethicist, Jacob M. Appel of New York University, has gone so far as to argue that "children cloned for therapeutic purposes" such as "to donate bone marrow to a sibling with leukemia" may someday be viewed as heroes.

Proponents claim that human reproductive cloning also would produce benefits to couples who cannot otherwise procreate. In the early 2000s Severino Antinori and Panos Zavos stirred controversy when they publicly stated plans to create a fertility treatment that allows parents who are both infertile to have children with at least some of their DNA in their offspring.

In Aubrey de Grey's proposed SENS (Strategies for Engineered Negligible Senescence), one of the considered options to repair the cell depletion related to cellular senescence is to grow replacement tissues from stem cells harvested from a cloned embryo.

There are also ethical objections. Article 11 of UNESCO's Universal Declaration on the Human Genome and Human Rights asserts that the reproductive cloning of human beings is contrary to human dignity, that a potential life represented by the embryo is destroyed when embryonic cells are used, and there is a significant likelihood that cloned individuals would be biologically damaged, due to the inherent unreliability of cloning technology.

Ethicists have speculated on difficulties that might arise in a world where human clones exist. For example, human cloning might change the shape of family structure by complicating the role of parenting within a family of convoluted kinship relations. For example, a female DNA donor would be the clone's genetic twin, rather than mother, complicating the genetic and social relationships between mother and child as well as the relationships between other family members and the clone. In another example, there may be expectations that the cloned individuals would act identically to the human from which they were cloned, which could infringe on the right to self-determination.

Proponents of animal rights argue that non-human animals possess certain moral rights as living entities and should therefore be afforded the same ethical considerations as human beings. This would negate the exploitation of animals in scientific research on cloning, cloning used in food production, or as other resources for human use or consumption.

== Religious views ==
Religious views of cloning are mixed.

=== Jainism and Hinduism ===
Hinduism views on cloning are very diverse. While some Hindu people view therapeutic cloning as necessary to fix childlessness, others believe it is immoral to tamper with nature. The Sanatan Dharm (meaning the eternal set of duties for humans, which is what many people refer to Hinduism as) approves therapeutic cloning but does not approve human cloning. In Hinduism, one view has the creator, or the Brahman not as insecure to lay restrictions on scientific endeavours. Another view restricts human cloning. In Jainism, the birth of Mahavira is depicted as an operation of embryo transfer.

In modern-day India, there have been clones of livestock species. Examples include Garima from the National Dairy Research Institute located in Karnal, where many other clones have been developed in Bovine species.

=== Judaism ===
Jewish view on cloning is unclear, but some orthodox rabbis allows cloning as a method of reproduction if no other method is available. Jewish religion treats all life equally even if it was formed by cloning. Liberal Jewish groups oppose the cloning of humans.

=== Christianity ===
Most of the Christian churches, including World council of Churches and United Methodist Church, oppose the research of cloning of either human embryos or whole human. The Roman Catholic Church, under the papacy of Benedict XVI, condemned the practice of human cloning, in the magisterial instruction Dignitas Personae, stating that it represents a "grave offense to the dignity of that person as well as to the fundamental equality of all people." Many conservative Christian groups have opposed human cloning and the cloning of human embryos, since they believe that life begins at the moment of conception. Other Christian denominations such as the United Church of Christ do not believe a fertilized egg constitutes a living being, but still they oppose the cloning of embryonic cells.

=== Islam ===
There are different views when it comes to cloning in Islam, some scholars are of the view that human reproductive cloning is absolutely forbidden whilst others are of the view that there are some exceptions.

According to one opinion, Animal cloning is allowed in Islam only if it bring benefits to all people and no harm is caused to the animal used in the cloning process.

== Animal cloning ==
Cloned animals are used in medical research, pet cloning or for food.

=== Pet cloning ===
In 2005, an article in The Hastings Center Report said:

Critics of pet cloning typically offer three objections: (1) the cloning process causes animals to suffer; (2) widely available pet cloning could have bad consequences for the overwhelming numbers of unwanted companion animals; and, (3) companies that offer pet cloning are deceiving and exploiting grieving pet owners.

=== Cloning animals for food ===
On December 28, 2006, the U.S. Food and Drug Administration (FDA) approved the consumption of meat and other products from cloned animals. Cloned-animal products were said to be indistinguishable from the non-cloned animals. Furthermore, companies would not be required to provide labels informing the consumer that the meat comes from a cloned animal. In 2007, some meat and dairy producers did propose a system to track all cloned animals as they move through the food chain, suggesting that a national database system integrated into the National Animal Identification System could eventually allow food labeling. However, as of 2013 no tracking system exists, and products from cloned animals are sold for human consumption in the United States.

Critics have raised objections to the FDA's approval of cloned-animal products for human consumption, arguing that the FDA's research was inadequate, inappropriately limited, and of questionable scientific validity. Several consumer-advocate groups are working to encourage a tracking program that would allow consumers to become more aware of cloned-animal products within their food.

A 2013 review noted that there is widespread misunderstanding about cloned and cattle, and found that cloned cattle that reached adulthood and entered the food supply were substantially equivalent to conventional cattle with respect to the quality of meat and milk, and with respect to their reproductive capability.

In 2015, the European Union voted to ban the cloning of farm animals (cattle, pigs, sheep, goats, and horses), and the sale of cloned livestock, their offspring, and products derived from them, such as meat and milk. The ban excluded cloning for research, and for the conservation of rare breeds and endangered species. However, no law was passed after the vote. As of 2024, horse cloning continues to be legal in the EU, with the Zangersheide registry in Belgium offering three cloned stallions for breeding.

== In popular culture ==
- Orphan Black, a Canadian television series, explores the ethics of cloning through its clone protagonists.
- The ethics of creating clones for organ harvesting (similar to savior siblings) is explored in Never Let Me Go by Kazuo Ishiguro.
- The ethical dilemma of cloning deceased loved ones as well as questions regarding the right of clones to exist alongside their original counterparts as equals are present in the Japanese version of the film Mewtwo Strikes Back and its accompanying radio drama.

Contribute your essay on Ethics of cloning to Wikiversity
