= Royana =

First Iranian cloned sheep

Royana (2006–2010) was Iran's and the Middle East's first successfully cloned sheep. Royana was a brown male domestic sheep and was cloned in the Royan Research Institute in Isfahan, Iran (The word Royan means embryo in Persian). He was the second cloned sheep in Royan Research Institute, but whereas the first sheep died few hours after birth, Royana lived for a few years.

== Birth ==
On September 30, 2006, a group of scientists in Iran cloned Royana from an adult cell in a test tube in a laboratory. After the embryo proved its stability, scientists transferred it to the uterus of a female sheep. After a period of 145 days, Royana was born by caesarean section. Despite critical conditions, he survived and thrived. Royana was born on April 15, 2006, 1:30 am at Isfahan campus of Royan Institute by cesarean section in a healthy condition.

== Death ==
Royana was euthanized after the abdominal pain was traced to his liver. It was also thought that Royana suffered premature death syndrome. Royana died at the age of three.

His birth was a great step in the production of transgenic lambs containing factor IX transgenic, which is helpful in human blood clotting.

== See also ==
- List of cloned animals
