= Little Nicky (cat) =

First commercially produced clone of a cat

- Species: Felis catus
- Breed: Maine Coon
- Born: October 17, 2004 (age 21)
- Nationality: United States
- Owner: Julie

Little Nicky (born October 17, 2004) is the first commercially produced clone of a cat. He was produced from the DNA of a 17-year-old Maine Coon cat named Nicky who died in 2003. Little Nicky's owner, a north Texas woman named Julie (whose last name was not released) paid $50,000 to have Nicky cloned. Little Nicky's owner reported that the cat shared many characteristics with his predecessor, including a similar personality and appearance.

== Origin and cloning ==
The cloning of Little Nicky was performed by the California-based company Genetic Savings & Clone, which later closed in 2006. This followed the first successful cloning of a cat by the company in conjunction with Texas A&M University. The cloning was performed by the chromatin transfer technique, a variant of nuclear transfer. The cloning of Little Nicky was a result of an offer by the company called the "Nine Lives Extravaganza" launched in 2004.

== Ethical controversy ==
Groups such as the Humane Society of the United States, the Best Friends Animal Society, and other groups for animal welfare spoke out against the creation of pet clones such as Little Nicky. They emphasized that the $50,000 invested in the cloning of animals could be utilized for the care of existing animals in shelters, or invested in programs for spaying and neutering homeless shelter pet populations.

Little Nicky reportedly had health problems during his life. These health problems were not proven to be related to the cloning process. His owner claims that the original Nicky never had the health problems that the clone had. The company that cloned Little Nicky believes that his health issues were acquired and not genetic.

== See also ==
- Pet cloning
- CC (cat) – first cloned cat
- Genetic Savings & Clone
- List of individual cats
