= Ralph (rat) =

Cloned rat

- Species: Rattus
- Sex: Male
- Born: 2002; Jouy-en-Josas, France

Ralph was the first cloned rat. He was created by a team of researchers at the National Institute for Agricultural Research in France, working with a biotech company, genOway. To give birth to Ralph, 129 embryos were implanted into two females, and one became pregnant and gave birth to three rats, with Ralph being the first to be born. Rats are particularly difficult to clone, as early development in rodents is different from that in other mammals. Rat eggs "activate" as soon as they leave the ovaries, making it difficult to introduce new genetic material. A chemical is needed to stabilize the embryo before cloning is possible.

Ralph has been cloned for medical purposes requiring genetically identical animals including testing in impact of genetics and the environment in the development of many diseases, as well as to take away and modify genes, as well as to solve a problem with rat physiology. Cloned from an adult cell, Ralph was cloned by researchers from China and France.

== See also ==
- List of cloned animals
