= Maya (wolf) =

Cloned animal

Maya (玛雅)
- Species: Arctic wolf
- Sex: Female
- Born: 10 June 2022 (age 4)
- Nationality: China

Maya (Chinese: 玛雅) is a cloned female arctic wolf that was born from a beagle surrogate mother in China. She was born on June 10, 2022, and news of her birth was revealed to the public on September 19 of the same year at Harbin Polarland, in China's Heilongjiang Province, by the biotechnology company Sinogene.

== Genesis and birth ==
Maya was cloned in a Beijing lab using skin cells from a 16-year-old female donor arctic wolf, also named Maya, that was living in Harbin Polarland, an arctic theme-park in China. A skin cell from the donor wolf was inserted into the enucleated egg cell of a female beagle, whereby the somatic nucleus from the skin cell and the recipient oocyte were reconstituted into a new embryo. This method was performed in order to construct 137 new embryos. Scientists then inserted 85 of the embryos into seven different beagle surrogate mothers. The experiments resulted in failed births six out of seven times, with Maya being the only wolf born successfully. Although she was born on 10 June 2022, researchers decided to wait 100 days before unveiling her to the public due to the high likelihood that she would die young. Researchers said that it would be impossible to release her into the wild due to her lack of socialization with other wolves for the beginning of her life. She was then moved to Harbin Polarland where she now lives with her beagle surrogate mother.

== Implications for conservation ==
Although arctic wolves are not under threat, the researchers behind Maya hope that the genetic technology used can potentially help other species under threat as the world heads into an extinction crisis. Sinogene, the company behind Maya, said that it will be working with the Beijing Wildlife Park to research more applications for the cloning of rare and endangered animals in China.

== See also ==
- List of animals that have been cloned
- List of wolves
