= Sinogene Biotechnology =

Animal cloning company

- Industry: Biotechnology
- Headquarters: Bejing, China
- Key people: Mi Jidong (CEO)
- Services: Pet cloning
- Website: www.sinogenepets.com

Sinogene Biotechnology is a Chinese biotechnology company, focusing on animal cloning technology. In 2022, Sinogene was the first to clone a wild Arctic wolf.

== History ==
Sinogene Biotechnology began offering dog cloning services in 2017 and later introduced cat cloning in 2019.

In 2022, Sinogene became the first company to successfully clone an Arctic wolf, and started horse cloning in 2023. The donor cell came from a wild female Arctic wolf, the oocyte was from a female dog, and the surrogate was a beagle. The company transferred 85 embryos into seven beagles and one Arctic wolf was born. In June of the same year, Sinogene cloned a male horse using skin cells from a horse born in 1995.

Sinogene partnered with Beijing Wildlife Park in 2022 to work together on improving breeding for endangered animals as well as improving ways to protect endangered animals.

Sinogene clients can harvest cells from their living pets, to one day use in the cloning process after their pet dies. Customers receive their cloned animals three months after they are born for fees starting at $55,000.
