= Oyalı (sheep) =

First cloned animal in Turkey

Oyalı (21 November 2007 - 16 April 2012) was a sheep who was the first cloned animal in Turkey.

Oyalı was successfully cloned from an adult somatic cell. She was cloned by Prof. Dr. Sema Birler and colleagues in November 2007 in Istanbul University in Istanbul, Turkey. She gave birth to Bahar on 30 March 2011.

Oyah had died from a progressive lung disease on 16 April 2012.

== See also ==
- Dolly (sheep)
- List of cloned animals
