= Byeong Chun Lee =

South Korean biologist (born 1965)

Byeong Chun Lee (Korean: 이병천; born January 5, 1965), also spelled Lee Byeong-chun, is the veterinary professor at Seoul National University responsible for the ₩300 million KRW (about US$240,000) "Toppy" dog cloning program in 2007. Yi is a former aide to Hwang Woo-suk, a pioneer in the field with the "Snuppy" clone, who fell from grace after his stem cell research turned out to have been fabricated. Yi has been described as "one of the world's best-known dog cloning experts."
