= Injaz (camel) =

Cloned camel

- Other name: Arabic: إنجاز
- Species: Dromedary camel
- Sex: Female
- Born: April 8, 2009; Dubai, United Arab Emirates
- Died: January 12, 2020 (aged 10); Dubai, United Arab Emirates
- Cause of death: Maternal death
- Named after: "achievement"

Injaz (Arabic: إنجاز, meaning 'achievement'; April 8, 2009- January 12, 2020) was a female dromedary camel, credited with being the world's first cloned camel. Nisar Ahmad Wani, a reproductive biologist and head of the research team at the Camel Reproduction Center in Dubai, United Arab Emirates, announced on April 14, 2009, that the cloned camel was born after an "uncomplicated" gestation of 378 days. The cloning project had the personal endorsement and financial support of Mohammed bin Rashid Al Maktoum, the Prime Minister, Vice President of the United Arab Emirates, and the emir of Dubai. Prior to this, there had been several unsuccessful attempts in the Emirate to clone a camel.

Injaz was created from ovarian cells of an adult camel slaughtered for its meat in 2005. The cells were grown in tissue culture and then frozen in liquid nitrogen. Afterwards, one of the cells was injected into a nucleus-removed oocyte of the surrogate camel, which were then fused with an electric current and chemically induced to initiate cell division. The resulting embryo was cultured for a week and implanted back into the surrogate camel's uterus. Twenty days later, its pregnancy was confirmed using ultrasound and monitored throughout the gestation period. After Injaz's birth, its DNA was tested at the Molecular Biology and Genetics Laboratory in Dubai and confirmed to be identical copies of the DNA of the original ovarian cells, proving that Injaz is a clone of the original camel.

Camel racing is a lucrative industry in the UAE. Ulrich Wernery and Lulu Skidmore, commented that the camel cloning "gives a means of preserving the valuable genetics of our elite racing and milk-producing camels in the future."

Injaz's first birth was lauded around the world as proof that cloned camels could conceive naturally. She gave birth to her first calf, a female, on November 2, 2015, at a center in Dubai. Injaz was able to conceive and give birth naturally, which was considered a "colossal feat."

Injaz celebrated her 6th and 10th birthday in April 2015 and 2019, marking a milestone in the development of cloning and biotechnology in the UAE. She lived a healthy life and gave birth to two cloned calves during her lifetime. Injaz died on January 12, 2020, while pregnant with her fourth calf.
