= Revive & Restore =

American nonprofit organization

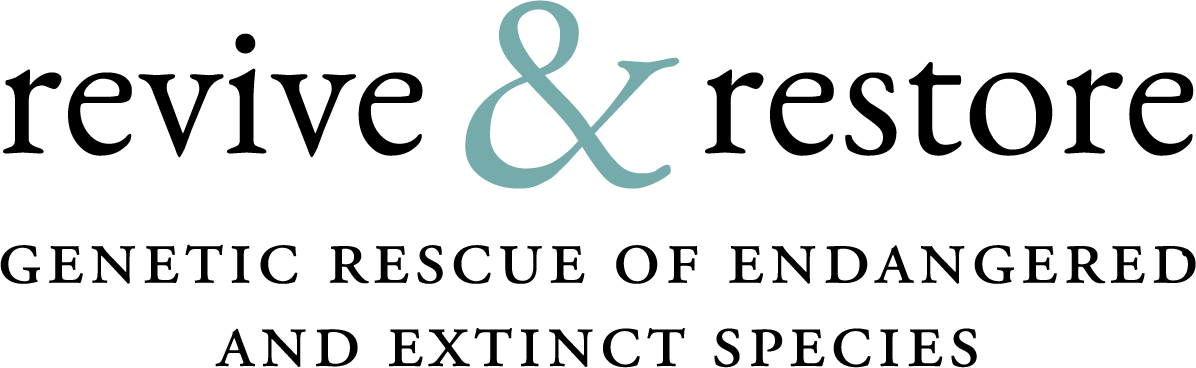
- Founded: 2012
- Founders: Ryan Phelan and Stewart Brand
- Type: 501(c)(3) Non-profit Organization
- Purpose: Genetic rescue of endangered and extinct species
- Region served: Global
- Revenue: $5.5 million in 2022
- Website: reviverestore.org

Revive & Restore is a non-profit wildlife conservation organization focused on use of biotechnology in conservation. Headquartered in Sausalito, California, the organization's mission is to enhance biodiversity through the genetic rescue of endangered and extinct species. The organization was founded by Stewart Brand and his wife, Ryan Phelan.

Revive & Restore has created a "Genetic Rescue Toolkit" for wildlife conservation – a suite of biotechnology tools adapted from human medicine and commercial agriculture that can improve wildlife conservation outcomes. The toolkit includes biobanking and cell culturing, genetic sequencing, and advanced reproductive technologies, such as cloning. The toolkit complements traditional conservation practices, such as captive breeding and habitat restoration.

Revive & Restore has caused controversy. In particular, Brand's work in de-extinction has been characterized as "playing god" and criticized for taking time and money away from traditional conservation efforts. In addition, many are concerned by the concept of cloning, even in the context of conservation.

== History ==
Revive & Restore was co-founded in 2012 by Stewart Brand and Ryan Phelan with the idea of bringing biotechnology solutions to conservation. The group was incubated by the Long Now Foundation until 2017, when it became an independent 501(c)(3) organization.

In 2013 Revive & Restore organized the first public meeting on de-extinction. Their founding projects include the de-extinction of the passenger pigeon and heath hen. Another one of their founding projects was to revive the woolly mammoth, but the project was given to George Church in 2021 and is now managed by Colossal Biosciences. Since then, Revive & Restore has established partnerships with research institutions, governmental agencies, and conservation organizations on a broad range of genetic rescue programs.

Revive & Restore is a member of the International Union for Conservation of Nature (IUCN) and has long-standing partnerships with the US Fish & Wildlife Service, The San Diego Zoo Wildlife Alliance, Morris Animal Foundation, and ViaGen Pets & Equine, among others.

== Programs ==
=== Advanced Coral Toolkit ===
The Advanced Coral Toolkit supports research teams in the development and field testing of biotechnologies that benefit coral reef management and restoration efforts. Projects include coral cryopreservation methods for large scale biobanking and fieldable devices for measuring genetic information or molecular signals associated with coral stress. Launched in 2019, the program has funded 10 research teams.

=== Wild Genomes ===
Wild Genomes is a funding program to provide genomic tools to field scientists, wildlife managers, and citizens working to protect their local biodiversity. As of 2023, Wild Genomes has funded 30 individual projects. Program categories include Terrestrial Species, Marine Species, Amphibians, and Kelp Ecosystems.

=== Cloning for conservation ===
To help mitigate inbreeding depression for two endangered species, the black-footed ferret (Mustela nigripes) and Przewalski's horse (Equus ferus przewalskii), Revive & Restore facilitates on-going efforts to clone individuals from historic cell lines stored at the San Diego Zoo Wildlife Alliance Frozen Zoo.

On December 10, 2020, the world's first cloned black-footed ferret was born. This ferret, named Elizabeth Ann, marked the first time a U.S. endangered species was successfully cloned.

On August 6, 2020, the world's first cloned Przewalski’s horse was born. Since the oocyte used was from a domestic horse, this was an example of interspecies somatic cell nuclear transfer (SCNT). In 2022, the horse, named Kurt, was paired with a female Przewalski's horse at the San Diego Zoo Wildlife Safari Park to learn the behaviors of his species. On February 17, 2023, a second cloned Przewalski's horse was born from the same historic cell line. Kurt and the new foal are genetic twins that may become the first cloned animals to restore lost genetic variation to their species.

=== Intended Consequences Initiative ===
In 2020, Revive & Restore developed a campaign around the concept of "Intended Consequences" – focusing on the benefits of conservation interventions, as opposed to focusing on the fears of unintended consequences. That year, Revive & Restore hosted a virtual workshop that resulted in the publication of a special issue in the journal Conservation Science and Practice.

=== The Great Passenger Pigeon Comeback ===
Since 2012, Revive & Restore has been working to de-extinct the passenger pigeon (Ectopistes migratorius), a wild North American pigeon that was the most abundant bird in the world prior to the death of its final member in 1914. The goals behind this project are to insert the key genes of the passenger pigeon into its closest living relative, the band-tailed pigeon, to create a functional reconstruction of the species that can fulfil the original's ecological niche in the Eastern United States. Revive & Restore plans to hatch the first generation of these passenger pigeons by 2029 for captive breeding and research purposes, but it will take decades for the species to be reintroduced into the wild.

== See also ==
- Rewilding Europe
