= Genetic Savings & Clone =

Company in California, U.S. (2004–2006)

Genetic Savings & Clone, Inc. was a company headquartered in Sausalito, California that offered commercial pet gene banking and cloning services, between 2004 and 2006. The company was launched by billionaire John Sperling, the founder of University of Phoenix. Its Chief Executive Officer was Lou Hawthorne.

== History ==
The company was founded as a result of the efforts to clone Lou Hawthorne's favorite family dog, Missy. The Missyplicity project generated enough interest that Lou Hawthorne decided to build a company devoted to dog and cat cloning.

The company opened for business in February 2000, funded production of the first cloned cat, CC, in 2001, and launched its pet cloning service in February 2004, operating a "petbank", to which pet owners could send tissue samples for later use in cloning. The company delivered the world's first commercially cloned cat, Little Nicky, in December 2004. Little Nicky was sold to a Texas woman for a reported US$50,000. He was a genetic twin of "Nicky", a 17-year-old Maine Coon cat that had been kept as a pet. Musician Liam Lynch's cat was cloned after its death, presumably making him the first celebrity to own a cloned pet.

As well as their success in cloning cats, the company also made significant advances in dog cloning research, although the technology was not mature enough to sustain the business. The company closed in 2006. Letters to this effect were sent out to clients at the end of September 2006, informing them of this decision and offering to transfer any genetic material to another facility.

== Controversy ==
The company spurred widespread debate regarding the ethics and morality of pet cloning especially in light of the fact that animals are euthanized by their owners every day. Though the topic lost currency with the closure of the company, divergent arguments about these issues can still be found on some web sites.
