= Nuclear transfer =

Form of cloning

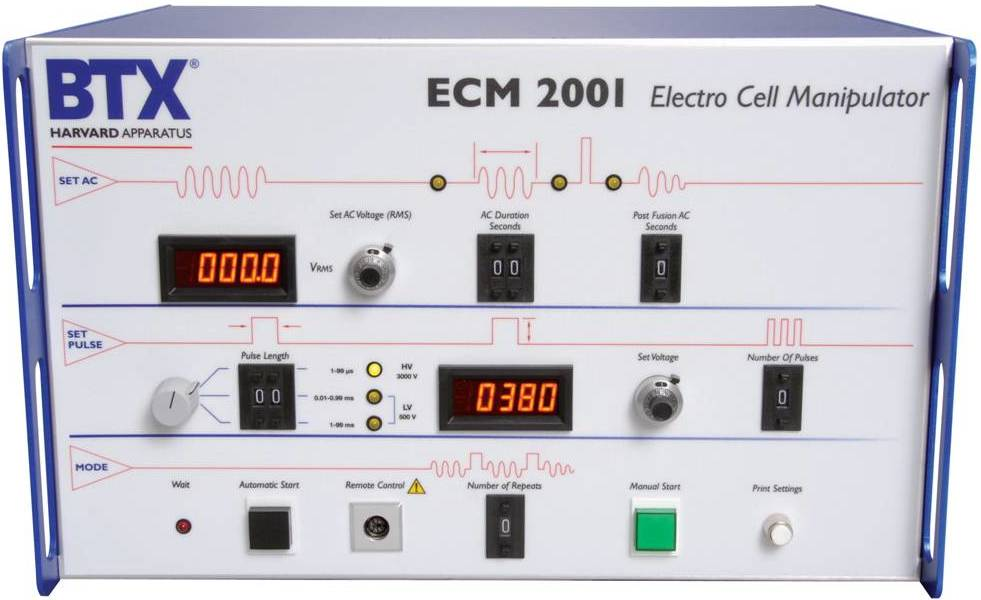
BTX ECM 2001 Electrofusion generator used for nuclear transfer applications

Nuclear transfer is a form of cloning. The step involves removing the DNA from an oocyte (unfertilised egg), and injecting the nucleus which contains the DNA to be cloned. In rare instances, the newly constructed cell will divide normally, replicating the new DNA while remaining in a pluripotent state. If the cloned cells are placed in the uterus of a female mammal, a cloned organism develops to term in rare instances. This is how Dolly the Sheep and many other species were cloned. Cows are commonly cloned to select those that have the best milk production. On 24 January 2018, two monkey clones were reported to have been created with the technique for the first time.

Despite this, the low efficiency of the technique has prompted some researchers, notably Ian Wilmut, creator of Dolly the cloned sheep, to abandon it.

== Tools and reagents ==
Nuclear transfer is a delicate process that is a major hurdle in the development of cloning technology. Materials used in this procedure are a microscope, a holding pipette (small vacuum) to keep the oocyte in place, and a micropipette (hair-thin needle) capable of extracting the nucleus of a cell using a vacuum. For some species, such as mouse, a drill is used to pierce the outer layers of the oocyte.

Various chemical reagents are used to increase cloning efficiency. Microtubule inhibitors, such as nocodazole, are used to arrest the oocyte in M phase, during which its nuclear membrane is dissolved. Chemicals are also used to stimulate oocyte activation. When applied the membrane is completely dissolved.

== Somatic cell nuclear transfer ==
Somatic cell nuclear transfer (SCNT) is the process by which the nucleus of an oocyte (egg cell) is removed and is replaced with the nucleus of a somatic (body) cell (examples include skin, heart, or nerve cell). The two entities fuse to become one and factors in the oocyte cause the somatic nucleus to reprogram to a pluripotent state. The cell contains genetic information identical to the donated somatic cell. After stimulating this cell to begin dividing, in the proper conditions an embryo will develop. Stem cells can be extracted 5–6 days later and used for research.

== Reprogramming ==
Genomic reprogramming is the key biological process behind nuclear transfer. Currently unidentified reprogramming factors present in oocytes are capable of initiating a cascade of events that can reset the mature, specialized cell back to an undifferentiated, embryonic state. These factors are thought to be mainly proteins of the nucleus.

== See also ==
- Renucleation
- Mitochondrial replacement therapy § Ethics
