= Snuppy =

First cloned dog

- Snuppy in 2006, a few days before his first birthday
- Species: Canis familiaris
- Breed: Afghan Hound
- Sex: Male
- Born: April 24, 2005
- Died: May 2015 (age 10)
- Cause of death: Cancer
- Nationality: South Korea
- Known for: First cloned dog
- Named after: Seoul National University
- Awards: Time Magazine's Most Amazing Invention of 2005

Snuppy (Korean: 스너피, romanized: Seuneopi, a portmanteau of "SNU" and "puppy"; April 24, 2005 – May 2015) was an Afghan Hound, the first dog clone. The puppy was created using a cell from an ear from an adult Afghan Hound and involved 123 surrogate mothers, of which only two produced pups (Snuppy being the sole survivor). The Department of Theriogenology and Biotechnology at Seoul National University, which cloned Snuppy, was led by Woo Suk Hwang. Snuppy has since been used in the first known successful breeding between cloned canines after his sperm was used to artificially inseminate two cloned females, which resulted in the birth of 10 puppies in 2008. In 2017, 4 clones of Snuppy were made by Sooam, and were the first clones made of a cloned dog, to investigate potential health effects of cloning.

== History ==
After Dolly the sheep was cloned in 1996, scientists had managed to clone numerous other animals, including cats, cows, gaur, horses, mice, mules, pigs, rabbits and rats but had been unsuccessful in cloning a dog due to the problematic task of maturing a canine ovum in an artificial environment. After several failed attempts by other scientists, Woo Suk Hwang, a lead researcher at Seoul National University, created a clone using tissue from the ear of a 3-year-old Afghan Hound. 123 surrogate mothers were used to carry the embryos, of which 1,095 were implanted, the procedure resulted in only three pregnancies; one resulted in a miscarriage, the other pup was born successfully but died of pneumonia three weeks after birth, the successful clone was carried by a Labrador Retriever. From the original 1,095 embryos to the final two puppies, this placed the success rate of the project at less than two tenths of a percent. Snuppy was named as a portmanteau of the initials of the Seoul National University (SNU) and the word "puppy".

== Process ==
As the eggs in a female canine are only fertile during the estrus phase of the estrous cycle, the eggs could only be harvested during a three-week period each year. Due to complexities with removing eggs from canine ovaries the eggs had to be extracted from the oviduct, which required constant monitoring to achieve. The nucleus of each egg was replaced with the cell from the ear of the adult dog and then electrified and fused using a chemical reaction. The embryos were then transferred to the surrogate dogs. Three of the surrogate mothers became pregnant and two gave birth. Snuppy, the first to be born, survived while the other died two weeks after birth. This process of cloning Snuppy took nearly three years of intensive effort.

== Reaction ==
Snuppy was named as Time magazine's "Most Amazing Invention" of the year in 2005. Particular recognition was given to the cloning technique used in the process, which Time stated was "embodied by a history-making puppy". Despite numerous labs performing mammalian cloning, they hailed the achievements of Hwang's team as "extraordinary". The experiment was criticized by Robert Klitzman, director of Columbia University's Masters in Bioethics program, who said that the process raised the question of whether humans are "just a mass of cells and biological processes?" Hwang himself criticized the process, stating that it did not bring science any closer to human cloning and the complexities, coupled with the low success rate (one in 123), did not make it ethical to clone family pets. Ian Wilmut, the scientist behind the successful cloning of Dolly the sheep, said that the successful cloning of Snuppy proved that any mammal could be cloned in the correct environments and that a global ban on human cloning needed to be quickly implemented because of this. The Kennel Club criticised the entire concept of dog cloning, on the grounds that their mission is to "To promote in every way the general improvement of dogs" and no improvement can occur if replicas are being created.

== Controversy ==
Between late 2005–2006 Hwang was accused of a series of incidents of misconduct. The first allegations related to his work prior to Snuppy—the claim that he had successfully cloned a human embryo. The charges alleged Hwang had paid for egg donations and that some of the eggs came from his employees, which would constitute serious breaches of the code of bioethics. It was later found that photographs he published did not depict what was suggested and that most of the stem-cell lines he claimed to have created were not clones at all. This brought serious doubts about the validity of Snuppy, which Hwang consistently claimed was a genuine clone. Hwang hired HumanPass Inc., a Korean DNA lab to investigate Snuppy, who found that Snuppy was authentic. The findings by HumanPass were dismissed on the grounds that they were employed by Hwang, and a panel at the Seoul National University ordered their own investigation. The investigation found that, despite his fabrications in previous projects, Hwang's research related to Snuppy was accurate and Snuppy was a clone of the adult Afghan hound. As a result of his forgeries, Hwang was indicted for fraud and dismissed from the university.

== Developments ==
Veterinary professor Byeong Chun Lee took over leadership of the team behind Snuppy. In 2008, Snuppy became involved in the first known successful breeding between cloned canines, after sperm taken from Snuppy was used to artificially inseminate two cloned females, which resulted in the birth of 10 puppies. Nine of the puppies survived. The SNU team, under Lee, have gone on to clone over 30 dogs and five wolves. SNU, which claimed to own the patent for the process used to clone Snuppy, formed a license agreement with RNL Bio, a commercial pet cloning company. Hwang entered into a partnership with RNL Bio's competitor, BioArts International, which caused an ongoing legal battle into who owns the patent rights although Bio Arts withdrew from dog cloning in 2009. RNL completed the first commercial cloning in August 2008 but ran into financial trouble in 2013.

The world's first cloned sniffer dogs (all of which are named Toppy) were put to work by South Korean customs in July 2009.

Supporters of Hwang founded a company called Sooam Biotech where Hwang developed proprietary techniques based on a licence from ViaGen's subsidiary Start Licensing (which owns the original Dolly patent) and created cloned dogs for owners whose dogs had died, charging $100,000 a time. Sooam Biotech was reported to have cloned 700 dogs by 2015 and to be producing 500 cloned embryos of various species a day in 2016.

== Death ==
Snuppy developed cancer, which was the cause of his death in May 2015, at the age of 10.

== See also ==
- List of individual dogs
- List of cloned animals
