= Supercow (dairy) =

Supercow (also super cow or super-cow) is a term used in the dairy industry to denote lines or individual animals that have superior milk production: that is, which produce more milk per day, or in some cases produce more fat per gallon of milk.

Until recently, super-cows have been developed through selective breeding – either traditional breeding or, since the 1960s, artificial insemination. Now the term tends to be applied to cows that have been genetically altered or whose genome has been studied in order to improve breeding. By 2023, according to a news report "[i]n many countries, including the United States, farmers breed clones with conventional animals to add desirable traits, such as high milk production or disease resistance, into the gene pool". In that year, Chinese scientists reported the cloning of three so called "super-cows" with a milk productivity "nearly 1.7 times the amount of milk an average cow in the United States produced in 2021" and a plan for 1,000 such super-cows in the near-term.

== See also ==
- Environmental impacts of animal agriculture
- Genetically modified animal
