= CC (cat) =

Cloned cat

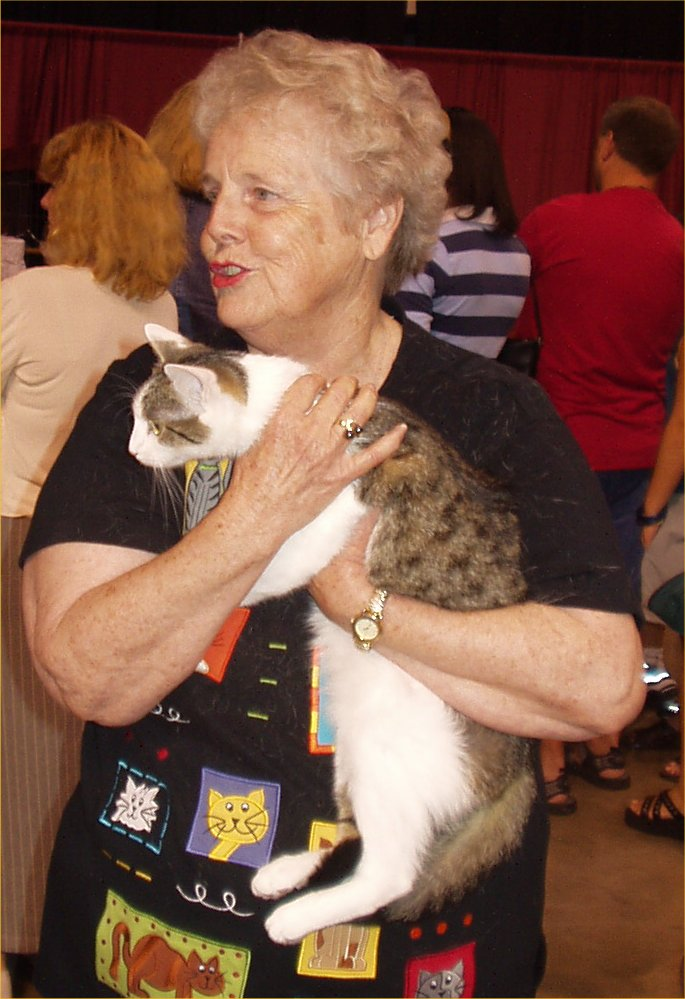
- CC, the first cloned cat, age 2, with her owner, Shirley Kraemer, in College Station, Texas
- Species: Felis catus
- Breed: Domestic shorthair
- Sex: Female
- Born: December 22, 2001; College Station, Texas
- Died: March 3, 2020 (aged 18); College Station, Texas
- Known for: First cloned pet
- Owner: Shirley Kraemer

CC, for "CopyCat" or "Carbon Copy" (December 22, 2001 – March 3, 2020), was a brown tabby and white domestic shorthair and the first cloned pet. She was cloned by scientists at Texas A&M University in conjunction with Genetic Savings & Clone Inc.

CC's surrogate mother was a tabby, but her genetic donor, Rainbow, was a calico domestic longhair. The difference in hair coloration between CC and Rainbow is due to X-inactivation and epigenetic re-programming, which normally occurs in a fertilized embryo before implantation.

In December 2006, CC gave birth to four kittens. The litter was fathered naturally by another lab cat named Smokey. It included two males named Tim and Zip and one female named Tess. Another kitten (a female) was stillborn. This incident was the first time a cloned pet gave birth. Throughout her life, CC appeared to be free of the cloning-related health problems that have arisen in some other animal clones. According to Shirley Kraemer, CC's owner: "CC has always been a perfectly normal cat and her kittens are just that way, too. ... We've been monitoring their health and all of them are fine, just like CC has been for the past five years."

On March 3, 2020, CC died at 18 years old in College Station, Texas.

== See also ==
- Little Nicky (cat)
- Pet cloning
- List of individual cats
