= Viagen =

Animal cloning company

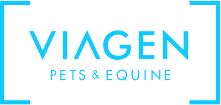
- Type: Division
- Founded: 2002; 24 years ago
- Headquarters: Cedar Park, Texas, United States
- Parent: Colossal Biosciences
- Website: viagenpets.com

Viagen Pets & Equine, based in Cedar Park, Texas, is a division of Colossal Biosciences that offers animal cloning services. Viagen's pets division was launched in 2016.

== Technology and patents ==
Viagen offers cloning as well as DNA preservation services, sometimes called tissue or cell banking.

Viagen's subsidiary Start Licensing owns a cloning patent which is licensed to their only competitor as of 2018, who also offers animal cloning services. The cloning process used by both Viagen and their competitor is somatic cell nuclear transfer, as which was used for cloning Dolly the Sheep.

== History ==
Viagen was founded in Austin, Texas in 2002. Viagen began by offering cloning to the livestock and equine industry in 2003, and later included cloning of cats and dogs in 2016.

In 2020, Viagen achieved the first successful cloning of an endangered species in the United States, the black-footed ferret. As of 2025, Viagen had successfully cloned 15 species, including Przewalski’s horse.

In November 2025, Viagen was acquired by Colossal Biosciences.
