= Cloning =

Process of producing individual organisms with identical genomes

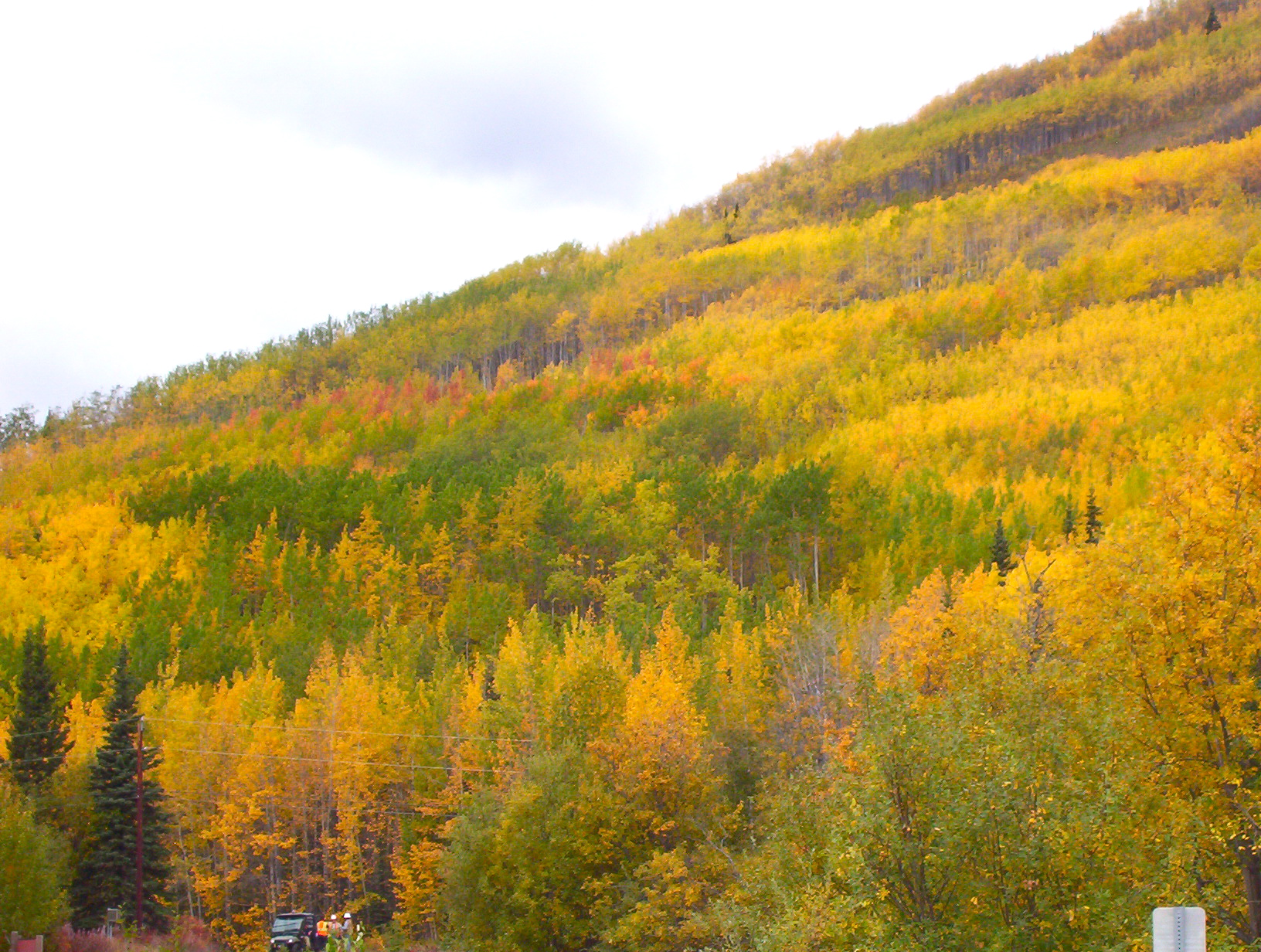
Many organisms, including aspen trees, reproduce by cloning, often creating large groups of organisms with the same DNA. One example depicted here is quaking aspen.

Cloning is the process of producing individual organisms with identical genomes, by either natural or artificial means. In nature, some organisms produce clones through asexual reproduction; this reproduction of an organism by itself without a mate is known as parthenogenesis. In the field of biotechnology, cloning is the process of creating cloned organisms of cells and of DNA fragments.

The artificial cloning of organisms, sometimes known as reproductive cloning, is often accomplished via somatic-cell nuclear transfer (SCNT), a cloning method in which a viable embryo is created from a somatic cell and an egg cell. In 1996, Dolly the sheep achieved notoriety for being the first mammal cloned from an adult somatic cell. Another example of artificial cloning is molecular cloning, a technique in molecular biology in which a single living cell is used to clone a large population of cells that contain identical DNA molecules.

In bioethics, there are a variety of ethical positions regarding the practice and possibilities of cloning. The use of embryonic stem cells, which can be produced through SCNT, in some stem cell research has attracted controversy. Cloning has been proposed as a means of reviving extinct species. In popular culture, the concept of cloning—particularly human cloning—is often depicted in science fiction; depictions commonly involve themes related to identity, the recreation of historical figures or extinct species, or cloning for exploitation (e.g. cloning soldiers for warfare).

== Etymology ==
Coined by Herbert J. Webber in 1903, the term clone derives from the Ancient Greek word κλών (klōn), twig, which is the process whereby a new plant is created from a twig. In botany, the term lusus was used. In horticulture, the spelling clon was used until the early twentieth century; the final e came into use to indicate the vowel is a "long o" instead of a "short o". Since the term entered the popular lexicon in a more general context, the spelling clone has been used exclusively.

== Natural cloning ==
Natural cloning is the production of clones without the involvement of genetic engineering techniques or human intervention (i.e. artificial cloning). Natural cloning occurs through a variety of natural mechanisms, from single-celled organisms to complex multicellular organisms, and has allowed life forms to spread for hundreds of millions of years. Versions of this reproduction method are used by plants, fungi, and bacteria, and is also the way that clonal colonies reproduce themselves. Some of the mechanisms are explored and used in plants and animals are binary fission, budding, fragmentation, and parthenogenesis. It can also occur during some forms of asexual reproduction, when a single parent organism produces genetically identical offspring by itself.

Many plants are well known for natural cloning ability, including blueberry plants, hazel trees, the Pando aspen grove, Appalachian hill cane, which appears to have lost or significantly reduced its ability for non-clonal reproduction, the Kentucky coffeetree, Myrica, and the American sweetgum.

It also occurs accidentally in the case of identical twins, which are formed when a fertilized egg splits, creating two or more embryos that carry identical DNA.

== Molecular cloning ==
Molecular cloning refers to the process of making multiple molecules. Cloning is commonly used to amplify DNA fragments containing whole genes, but it can also be used to amplify any DNA sequence such as promoters, non-coding sequences and randomly fragmented DNA. It is used in a wide array of biological experiments and practical applications ranging from genetic fingerprinting to large scale protein production. Occasionally, the term cloning is misleadingly used to refer to the identification of the chromosomal location of a gene associated with a particular phenotype of interest, such as in positional cloning. In practice, localization of the gene to a chromosome or genomic region does not necessarily enable one to isolate or amplify the relevant genomic sequence. To amplify any DNA sequence in a living organism, that sequence must be linked to an origin of replication, which is a sequence of DNA capable of directing the propagation of itself and any linked sequence. However, a number of other features are needed, and a variety of specialised cloning vectors (small piece of DNA into which a foreign DNA fragment can be inserted) exist that allow recombinant protein production, affinity tagging, transcription of single-stranded RNA or DNA production and a host of other molecular biology tools.

Cloning of any DNA fragment essentially involves four steps

1. fragmentation - breaking apart a strand of DNA
2. ligation – gluing together pieces of DNA in a desired sequence
3. Transformation – inserting the newly formed pieces of DNA into cells
4. screening/selection – selecting out the cells that were successfully transfected with the new DNA

Although these steps are invariable among cloning procedures a number of alternative routes can be selected that do not use ligation. These are summarized as a cloning strategy:

Initially, the DNA of interest needs to be isolated to provide a DNA segment of suitable size. Subsequently, a ligation procedure is used where the amplified fragment is inserted into a vector (piece of DNA). The vector (which is frequently circular) is linearised using restriction enzymes, and incubated with the fragment of interest under appropriate conditions with an enzyme called DNA ligase. Although this restriction/ligation method is the traditional method, other methods that rely on recombination (such as Gibson assembly or Golden Gate Cloning) have been developed and are commonly used. These do not use restriction enzymes but use overlaps between the insert and vector to cause recombination. Whether restriction/ligation or another method is used, the vector with the insert of interest is transformed into cells. A number of alternative techniques are available, such as chemical sensitization of cells, electroporation, optical injection and biolistics. Finally, the transfected cells are cultured, selecting for cells that had taken up the vector. As the aforementioned procedures are of particularly low efficiency, there is a need to identify the cells that have been successfully transfected with the vector construct containing the desired insertion sequence in the required orientation. Modern cloning vectors include selectable antibiotic resistance markers, which allow only cells in which the vector has successfully transformed, to grow. Additionally, the cloning vectors may contain colour selection markers, which provide blue/white screening (alpha-factor complementation) on X-gal medium. Nevertheless, these selection steps do not absolutely guarantee that the DNA insert is present in the cells obtained. Further investigation of the resulting colonies must be required to confirm that cloning was successful. This may be accomplished by means of PCR, restriction fragment analysis and/or DNA sequencing.

== Cell cloning ==
=== Cloning unicellular organisms ===
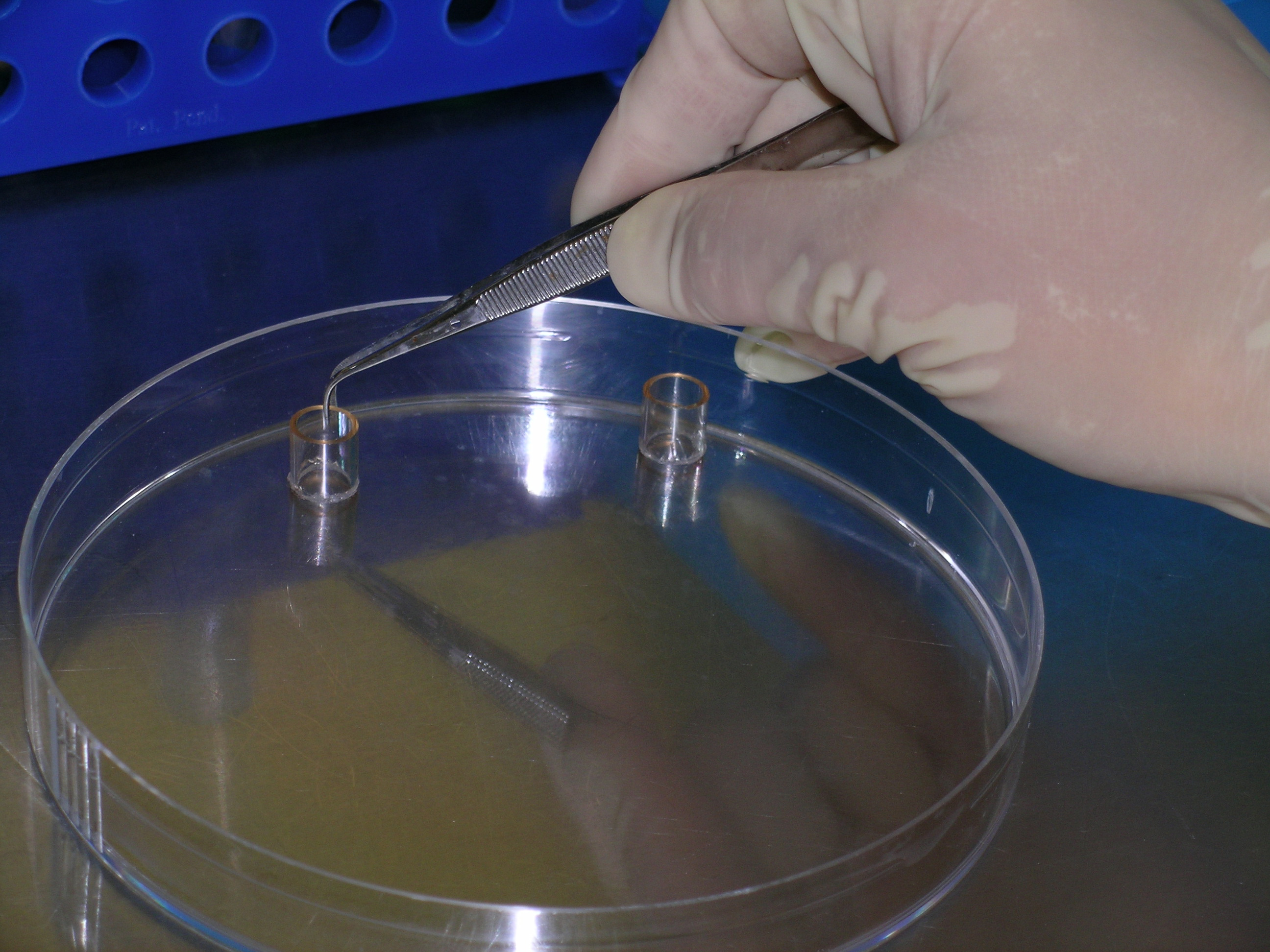
Cloning cell-line colonies using cloning rings

Cloning a cell means to derive a population of cells from a single cell. In the case of unicellular organisms such as bacteria and yeast, this process is remarkably simple and essentially only requires the inoculation of the appropriate medium. However, in the case of cell cultures from multi-cellular organisms, cell cloning is an arduous task as these cells will not readily grow in standard media.

A useful tissue culture technique used to clone distinct lineages of cell lines involves the use of cloning rings (cylinders). In this technique a single-cell suspension of cells that have been exposed to a mutagenic agent or drug used to drive selection is plated at high dilution to create isolated colonies, each arising from a single and potentially clonal distinct cell. At an early growth stage when colonies consist of only a few cells, sterile polystyrene rings (cloning rings), which have been dipped in grease, are placed over an individual colony and a small amount of trypsin is added. Cloned cells are collected from inside the ring and transferred to a new vessel for further growth.

=== Cloning stem cells ===
Somatic-cell nuclear transfer, popularly known as SCNT, can also be used to create embryos for research or therapeutic purposes. The most likely purpose for this is to produce embryos for use in stem cell research. This process is also called "research cloning" or "therapeutic cloning". The goal is not to create cloned human beings (called "reproductive cloning"), but rather to harvest stem cells that can be used to study human development and to potentially treat disease. While a clonal human blastocyst has been created, stem cell lines are yet to be isolated from a clonal source.

Therapeutic cloning is achieved by creating embryonic stem cells in the hopes of treating diseases such as diabetes and Alzheimer's. The process begins by removing the nucleus (containing the DNA) from an egg cell and inserting a nucleus from the adult cell to be cloned. In the case of someone with Alzheimer's disease, the nucleus from a skin cell of that patient is placed into an empty egg. The reprogrammed cell begins to develop into an embryo because the egg reacts with the transferred nucleus. The embryo will become genetically identical to the patient. The embryo will then form a blastocyst which has the potential to form/become any cell in the body.

The reason why SCNT is used for cloning is because somatic cells can be easily acquired and cultured in the lab. This process can either add or delete specific genomes of farm animals. A key point to remember is that cloning is achieved when the oocyte maintains its normal functions and instead of using sperm and egg genomes to replicate, the donor's somatic cell nucleus is inserted into the oocyte. The oocyte will react to the somatic cell nucleus, the same way it would to a sperm cell's nucleus.

The process of cloning a particular farm animal using SCNT is relatively the same for all animals. The first step is to collect the somatic cells from the animal that will be cloned. The somatic cells could be used immediately or stored in the laboratory for later use. The hardest part of SCNT is removing maternal DNA from an oocyte at metaphase II. Once this has been done, the somatic nucleus can be inserted into an egg cytoplasm. This creates a one-cell embryo. The grouped somatic cell and egg cytoplasm are then introduced to an electrical current. This energy will hopefully allow the cloned embryo to begin development. The successfully developed embryos are then placed in surrogate recipients, such as a cow or sheep in the case of farm animals.

SCNT is seen as a good method for producing agriculture animals for food consumption. It successfully cloned sheep, cattle, goats, and pigs. Another benefit is SCNT is seen as a solution to clone endangered species that are on the verge of going extinct. However, stresses placed on both the egg cell and the introduced nucleus can be enormous, which led to a high loss in resulting cells in early research. For example, the cloned sheep Dolly was born after 277 eggs were used for SCNT, which created 29 viable embryos. Only three of these embryos survived until birth, and only one survived to adulthood. As the procedure could not be automated, and had to be performed manually under a microscope, SCNT was very resource intensive. The biochemistry involved in reprogramming the differentiated somatic cell nucleus and activating the recipient egg was also far from being well understood. However, by 2014 researchers were reporting cloning success rates of seven to eight out of ten and in 2016, a Korean Company Sooam Biotech was reported to be producing 500 cloned embryos per day.

In SCNT, not all of the donor cell's genetic information is transferred, as the donor cell's mitochondria that contain their own mitochondrial DNA are left behind. The resulting hybrid cells retain those mitochondrial structures which originally belonged to the egg. As a consequence, clones such as Dolly that are born from SCNT are not perfect copies of the donor of the nucleus.

== Organism cloning ==
Organism cloning (also called reproductive cloning) refers to the procedure of creating a new multicellular organism, genetically identical to another. In essence this form of cloning is an asexual method of reproduction, where fertilization or inter-gamete contact does not take place. Asexual reproduction is a naturally occurring phenomenon in many species, including most plants and some insects. Scientists have made some major achievements with cloning, including the asexual reproduction of sheep and cows. There is a lot of ethical debate over whether or not cloning should be used. However, cloning, or asexual propagation, has been common practice in the horticultural world for hundreds of years.

=== Horticultural ===
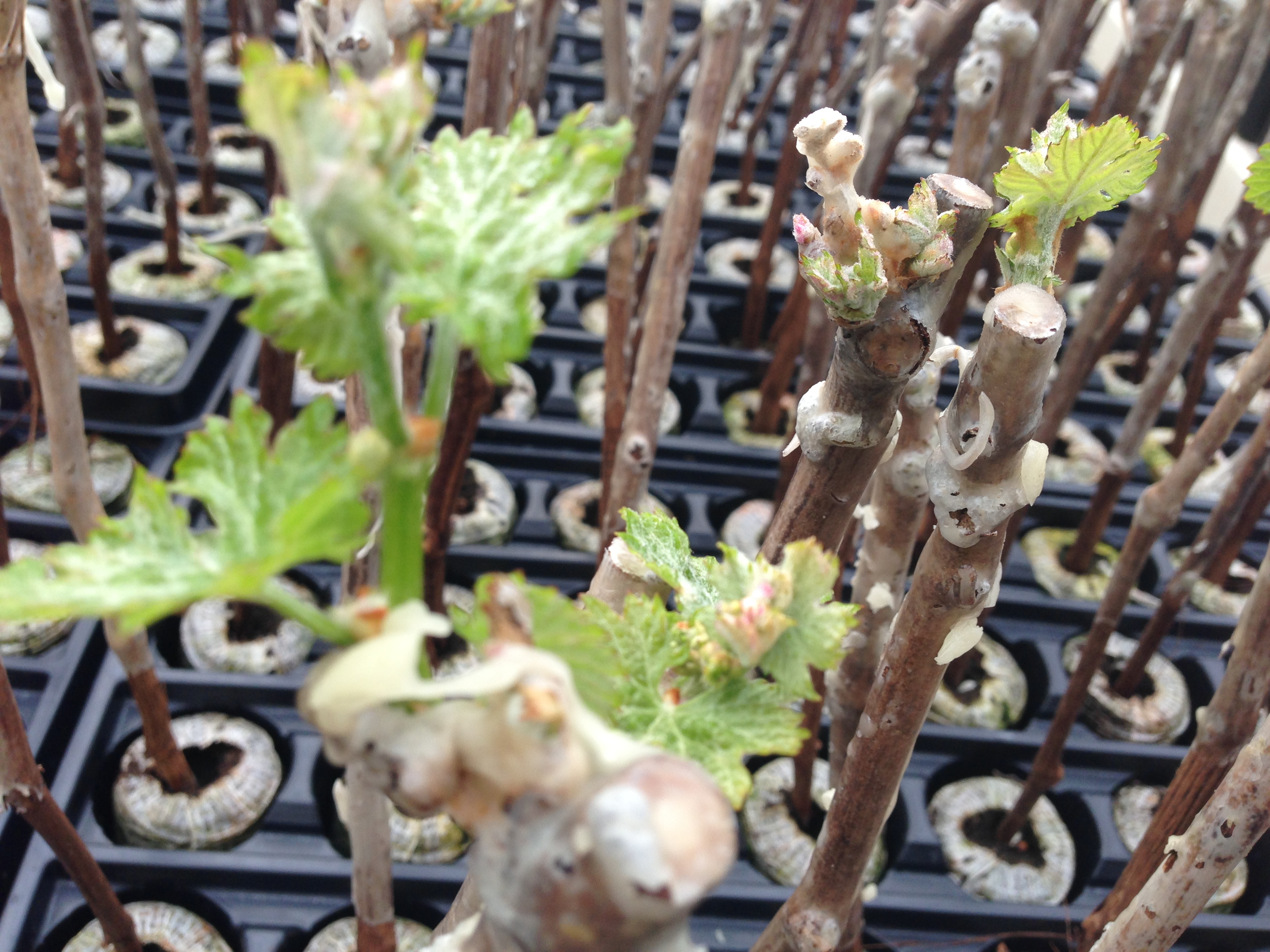
Propagating plants from cuttings, such as grape vines, is an ancient form of cloning.

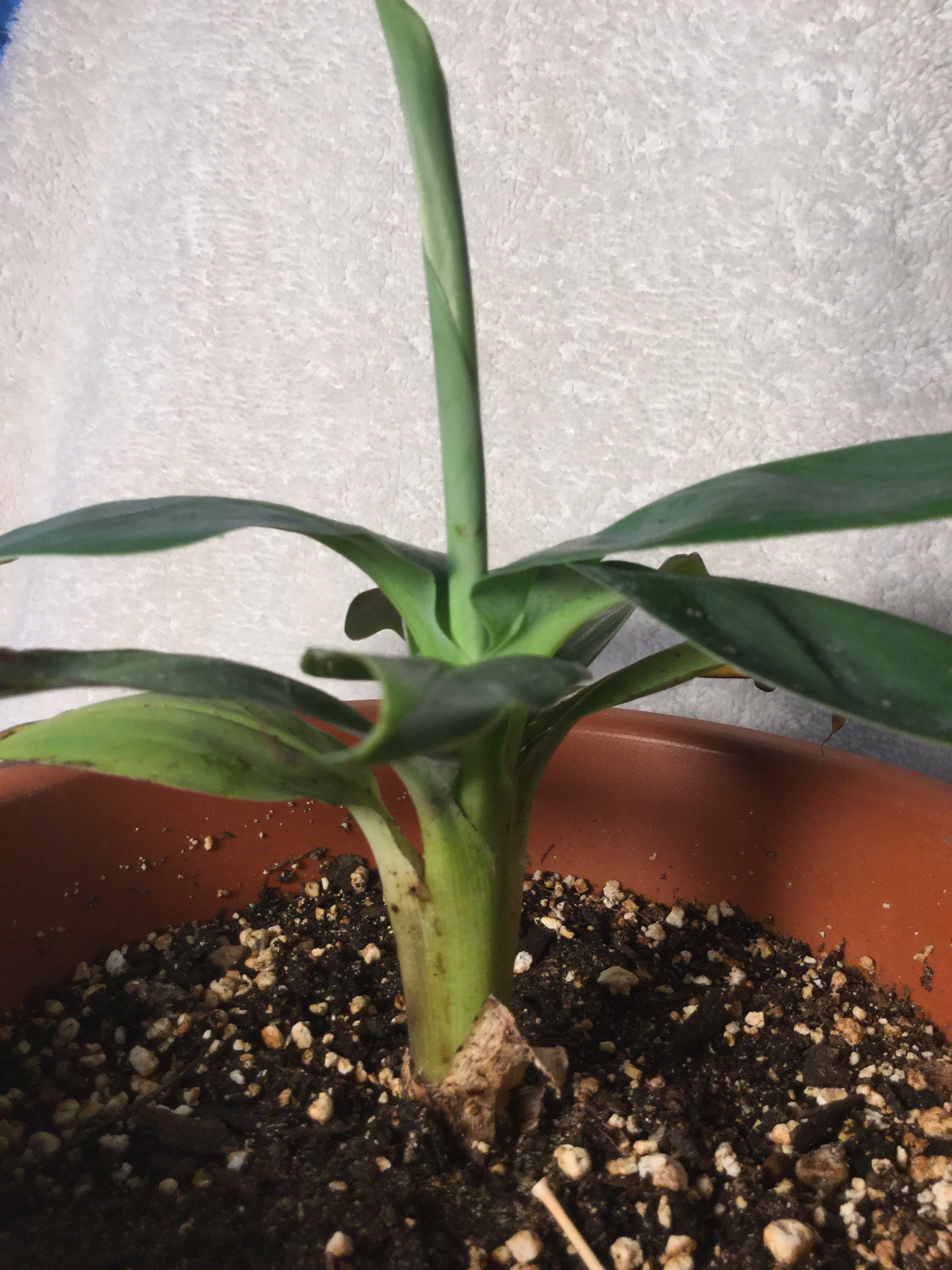
Bananas can reproduce by cloning (modern cultivars lack seeds).

The term clone is used in horticulture to refer to descendants of a single plant which were produced by vegetative reproduction or apomixis. Many horticultural plant cultivars are clones, having been derived from a single individual, multiplied by some process other than sexual reproduction. As an example, some European cultivars of grapes represent clones that have been propagated for over two millennia. Other examples are potatoes and bananas.

Grafting can be regarded as cloning, since all the shoots and branches coming from the graft are genetically a clone of a single individual, but this particular kind of cloning has not come under ethical scrutiny and is generally treated as an entirely different kind of operation.

Many trees, shrubs, vines, ferns and other herbaceous perennials form clonal colonies naturally. Parts of an individual plant may become detached by fragmentation and grow on to become separate clonal individuals. A common example is in the vegetative reproduction of moss and liverwort gametophyte clones by means of gemmae. Some vascular plants e.g. dandelion and certain viviparous grasses also form seeds asexually, termed apomixis, resulting in clonal populations of genetically identical individuals.

=== Parthenogenesis ===
Clonal derivation exists in nature in some animal species and is referred to as parthenogenesis (reproduction of an organism by itself without a mate). This is an asexual form of reproduction that is only found in females of some insects, crustaceans, nematodes, fish (for example the hammerhead shark), Cape honeybees, and lizards including the Komodo dragon and several whiptails. The growth and development occurs without fertilization by a male. In plants, parthenogenesis means the development of an embryo from an unfertilized egg cell, and is a component process of apomixis. In species that use the XY sex-determination system, the offspring will always be female. An example of partenogenesis is the little fire ant (Wasmannia auropunctata), which is native to Central and South America but has spread throughout many tropical environments.

=== Artificial cloning of organisms ===
Artificial cloning of organisms may also be called reproductive cloning.

==== First steps ====
Hans Spemann, a German embryologist was awarded a Nobel Prize in Physiology or Medicine in 1935 for his discovery of the effect now known as embryonic induction, exercised by various parts of the embryo, that directs the development of groups of cells into particular tissues and organs. In 1924 he and his student, Hilde Mangold, were the first to perform somatic-cell nuclear transfer using amphibian embryos – one of the first steps towards cloning.

==== Methods ====
Reproductive cloning generally uses "somatic cell nuclear transfer" (SCNT) to create animals that are genetically identical. This process entails the transfer of a nucleus from a donor adult cell (somatic cell) to an egg from which the nucleus has been removed, or to a cell from a blastocyst from which the nucleus has been removed. If the egg begins to divide normally it is transferred into the uterus of the surrogate mother. Such clones are not strictly identical since the somatic cells may contain mutations in their nuclear DNA. Additionally, the mitochondria in the cytoplasm also contains DNA and during SCNT this mitochondrial DNA is wholly from the cytoplasmic donor's egg, thus the mitochondrial genome is not the same as that of the nucleus donor cell from which it was produced. This may have important implications for cross-species nuclear transfer in which nuclear-mitochondrial incompatibilities may lead to death.

Artificial embryo splitting or embryo twinning, a technique that creates monozygotic twins from a single embryo, is not considered in the same fashion as other methods of cloning. During that procedure, a donor embryo is split in two distinct embryos, that can then be transferred via embryo transfer. It is optimally performed at the 6- to 8-cell stage, where it can be used as an expansion of IVF to increase the number of available embryos. If both embryos are successful, it gives rise to monozygotic (identical) twins.

==== Dolly the sheep ====
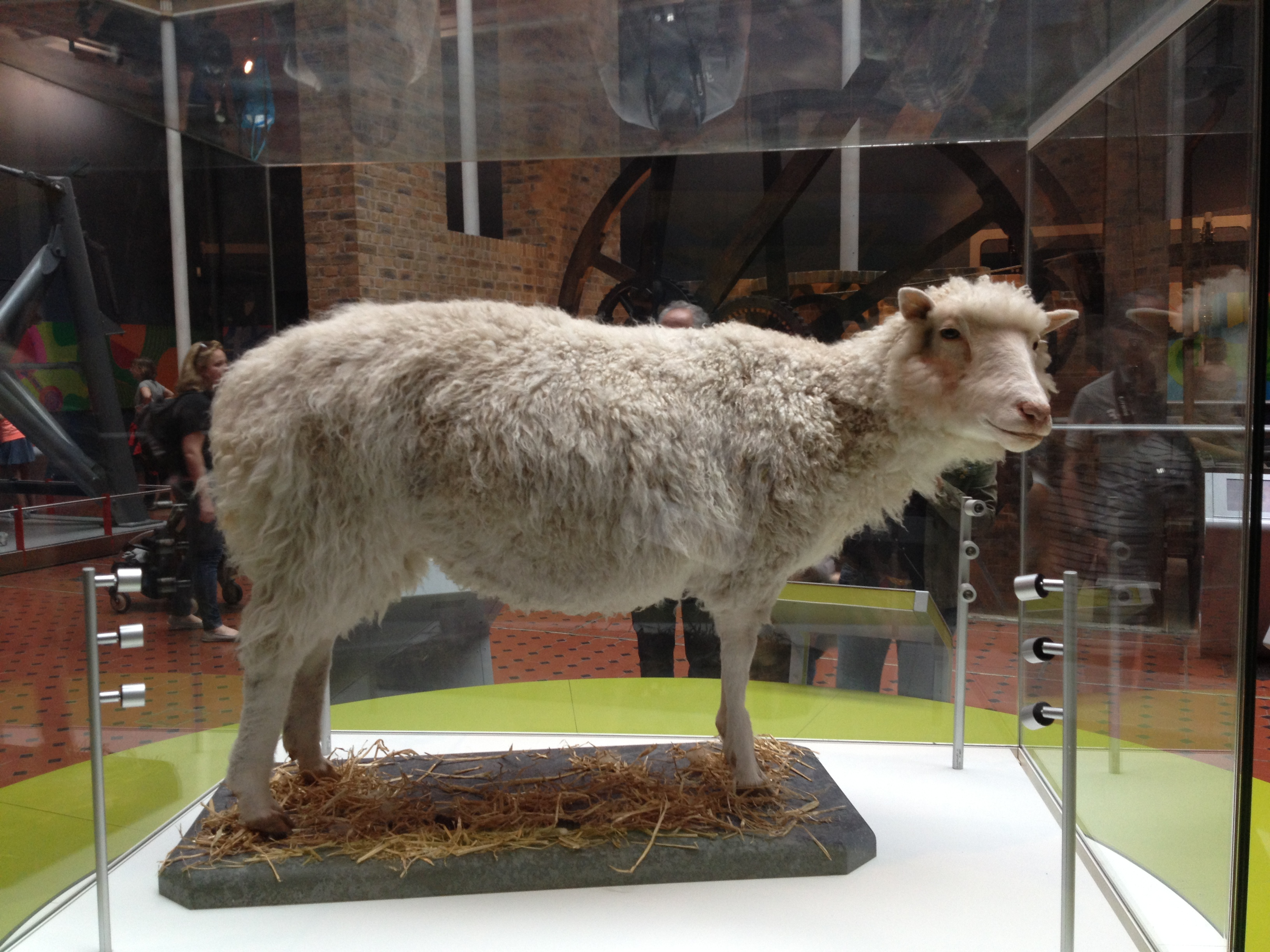
The taxidermied body of Dolly the sheep

Dolly clone

Dolly, a Finn-Dorset ewe, was the first mammal to have been successfully cloned from an adult somatic cell. Dolly was formed by taking a cell from the udder of her 6-year-old biological mother. Contrary to popular belief, she was not the first animal to be cloned. Dolly's embryo was created by taking the cell and inserting it into a sheep ovum. It took 435 attempts before an embryo was successful. The embryo was then placed inside a female sheep that went through a normal pregnancy. She was cloned at the Roslin Institute in Scotland by British scientists Sir Ian Wilmut and Keith Campbell and lived there from her birth in 1996 until her death in 2003 when she was six. She was born on 5 July 1996 but not announced to the world until 22 February 1997. Her stuffed remains were placed at Edinburgh's Royal Museum, part of the National Museums of Scotland.

Dolly was publicly significant because the effort showed that genetic material from a specific adult cell, designed to express only a distinct subset of its genes, can be redesigned to grow an entirely new organism. Before this demonstration, it had been shown by John Gurdon that nuclei from differentiated cells could give rise to an entire organism after transplantation into an enucleated egg. However, this concept was not yet demonstrated in a mammalian system.

The first mammalian cloning (resulting in Dolly) had a success rate of 29 embryos per 277 fertilized eggs, which produced three lambs at birth, one of which lived. In a bovine experiment involving 70 cloned calves, one-third of the calves died quite young. The first successfully cloned horse, Prometea, took 814 attempts. Notably, although the first clones were frogs, no adult cloned frog has yet been produced from a somatic adult nucleus donor cell.

There were early claims that Dolly had pathologies resembling accelerated aging. Scientists speculated that Dolly's death in 2003 was related to the shortening of telomeres, DNA-protein complexes that protect the end of linear chromosomes. However, other researchers, including Ian Wilmut who led the team that successfully cloned Dolly, argue that Dolly's early death due to respiratory infection was unrelated to problems with the cloning process. This idea that the nuclei have not irreversibly aged was shown in 2013 to be true for mice.

Dolly was named after performer Dolly Parton because the cells cloned to make her were from a mammary gland cell, and Parton was known for her ample cleavage.

==== Colossal dire wolves ====
In 2024, Colossal Biosciences announced they had brought the dire wolf back from extinction via cloning and genetic engineering. The biotech company created three grey wolf clones with 14 genes edited to express traits likely similar to those of dire wolves. Many scientists have contested whether the clones can be considered true dire wolves.

==== Species cloned and applications ====
The modern cloning techniques involving nuclear transfer have been successfully performed on several species. Notable experiments include:

- Tadpole: (1952) Robert Briggs and Thomas J. King successfully cloned northern leopard frogs: thirty-five complete embryos and twenty-seven tadpoles from one-hundred and four successful nuclear transfers.
- Carp: (1963) In China, embryologist Tong Dizhou produced the world's first cloned fish by inserting the DNA from a cell of a male carp into an egg from a female carp.
- Zebrafish: (1981) George Streisinger produced the next in line of the vertebrates.
- Sheep: (1984) Steen Willadsen produced the first cloned mammal from early embryonic cells.
  - In June 1995, the Roslin Institute cloned Megan and Morag from differentiated embryonic cells.
  - In July 1996, PPL Therapeutics and the Roslin Institute cloned Dolly the sheep from a somatic cell.
- Mouse: (1986) A mouse was successfully cloned from an early embryonic cell. In 1987, Soviet scientists Levon Chaylakhyan, Veprencev, Sviridova, and Nikitin cloned Masha, a mouse.
- Rhesus monkey: (October 1999) The Oregon National Primate Research Center cloned Tetra from embryo splitting and not nuclear transfer: a process more akin to artificial formation of twins.
- Pig: (March 2000) PPL Therapeutics cloned five piglets. By 2014, BGI in China was producing 500 cloned pigs a year to test new medicines.
- Gaur: (2001) was the first endangered species cloned.
- Cattle:
  - Alpha and Beta (males, 2001) and (2005), Brazil
  - In 2023, Chinese scientists reported the cloning of three supercows with a milk productivity "nearly 1.7 times the amount of milk an average cow in the United States produced in 2021" and a plan for 1,000 of such super cows in the near-term. According to a news report "[i]n many countries, including the United States, farmers breed clones with conventional animals to add desirable traits, such as high milk production or disease resistance, into the gene pool".
- Cat: CopyCat "CC" (female, late 2001), Little Nicky, 2004, was the first cat cloned for commercial reasons
- Rat: Ralph, the first cloned rat (2003)
- Mule: Idaho Gem, a john mule born 4 May 2003, was the first horse-family clone.
- Horse: Prometea, a Haflinger female born 28 May 2003, was the first horse clone.
- Przewalksi's Horse: An ongoing cloning program by the San Diego Zoo Wildlife Alliance and Revive & Restore attempts to reintroduce genetic diversity to this endangered species.
  - Kurt, the first cloned Przewalski's horse, was born in 2020. He was cloned from the skin tissue of a stallion which was preserved in 1980.
  - "Trey" was born in 2023. He was cloned from the same stallion's tissue as Kurt.
- Dog:
  - Snuppy, a male Afghan Hound was the first cloned dog (2005). In 2017, the world's first gene-editing clone dog, Apple, was created by Sinogene Biotechnology. Sooam Biotech, South Korea, was reported in 2015 to have cloned 700 dogs to date for their owners, including two Yakutian Laika hunting dogs, which are seriously endangered due to crossbreeding.
  - Cloning of super sniffer dogs was reported in 2011, four years afterwards when the dogs started working. Cloning of a successful rescue dog was also reported in 2009 and of a similar police dog in 2019. Cancer-sniffing dogs have also been cloned. A review concluded that "qualified elite working dogs can be produced by cloning a working dog that exhibits both an appropriate temperament and good health."
- Wolf: Snuwolf and Snuwolffy, the first two cloned female wolves (2005).
- Water buffalo: Samrupa was the first cloned water buffalo. It was born on 6 February 2009, at India's Karnal National Dairy Research Institute but died five days later due to lung infection.
- Pyrenean ibex: (2009) was the first extinct animal to be cloned back to life; the clone lived for seven minutes before dying of lung defects. The extinct Pyrenean ibex is a sub-species of the extant Spanish ibex.
- Camel: (2009) Injaz, was the first cloned camel.
- Pashmina goat: (2012) Noori, is the first cloned pashmina goat. Scientists at the faculty of veterinary sciences and animal husbandry of Sher-e-Kashmir University of Agricultural Sciences and Technology of Kashmir successfully cloned the first Pashmina goat (Noori) using the advanced reproductive techniques under the leadership of Riaz Ahmad Shah.
- Goat: (2001) Scientists of Northwest A&F University successfully cloned the first goat which use the adult female cell.
- Gastric brooding frog: (2013) The gastric brooding frog, Rheobatrachus silus, thought to have been extinct since 1983 was cloned in Australia, although the embryos died after a few days.
- Macaque monkey: (2017) First successful cloning of a primate species using nuclear transfer, with the birth of two live clones named Zhong Zhong and Hua Hua. Conducted in China in 2017, and reported in January 2018. In January 2019, scientists in China reported the creation of five identical cloned gene-edited monkeys, using the same cloning technique that was used with Zhong Zhong and Hua Hua and Dolly the sheep, and the gene-editing Crispr-Cas9 technique allegedly used by He Jiankui in creating the first ever gene-modified human babies Lulu and Nana. The monkey clones were made to study several medical diseases.
- Black-footed ferret: (2020) A team of scientists cloned a female named Willa, who died in the mid-1980s and left no living descendants. Her clone, a female named Elizabeth Ann, was born on 10 December. Scientists hope that the contribution of this individual will alleviate the effects of inbreeding and help black-footed ferrets better cope with plague. Experts estimate that this female's genome contains three times as much genetic diversity as any of the modern black-footed ferrets.
- First artificial parthenogenesis in mammals: (2022) Viable mice offspring was born from unfertilized eggs via targeted DNA methylation editing of seven imprinting control regions.

==== Human cloning ====
Human cloning is the creation of a genetically identical copy of a human. The term is generally used to refer to artificial human cloning, which is the reproduction of human cells and tissues. It does not refer to the natural conception and delivery of identical twins. The possibility of human cloning has raised controversies. These ethical concerns have prompted several nations to pass legislation regarding human cloning and its legality. In 2018, scientists declared they had no intention of trying to clone people, and they believed their results should spark a wider discussion about the laws and regulations the world needs to regulate cloning.

Two commonly discussed types of theoretical human cloning are therapeutic cloning and reproductive cloning. Therapeutic cloning would involve cloning cells from a human for use in medicine and transplants, and is an active area of research, but is not in medical practice anywhere in the world, as of 2024. Two common methods of therapeutic cloning that are being researched are somatic-cell nuclear transfer and, more recently, pluripotent stem cell induction. Reproductive cloning would involve making an entire cloned human, instead of just specific cells or tissues.

==== Ethical issues of cloning ====
There are a variety of ethical positions regarding the possibilities of cloning, especially human cloning. While many of these views are religious in origin, the questions raised by cloning are faced by secular perspectives as well. Perspectives on human cloning are theoretical, as human therapeutic and reproductive cloning are not commercially used; animals are currently cloned in laboratories and in livestock production.

Advocates support development of therapeutic cloning to generate tissues and whole organs to treat patients who otherwise cannot obtain transplants, to avoid the need for immunosuppressive drugs, and to stave off the effects of aging. Advocates for reproductive cloning believe that parents who cannot otherwise procreate should have access to the technology.

Opponents of cloning have concerns that technology is not yet developed enough to be safe and that it could be prone to abuse (leading to the generation of humans from whom organs and tissues would be harvested), as well as concerns about how cloned individuals could integrate with families and with society at large. Cloning humans could lead to serious violations of human rights.

Religious groups are divided, with some opposing the technology as usurping "God's place" and, to the extent embryos are used, destroying a human life; others support therapeutic cloning's potential life-saving benefits. There is at least one religion, Raëlism, in which cloning plays a major role.

Contemporary work on this topic is concerned with the ethics, adequate regulation and issues of any cloning carried out by humans, not potentially by extraterrestrials (including in the future), and largely also not replication – also described as mind cloning – of potential whole brain emulations.

Cloning of animals is opposed by animal-groups due to the number of cloned animals that suffer from malformations before they die, and while food from cloned animals has been approved as safe by the US FDA, its use is opposed by groups concerned about food safety.

In practical terms, the inclusion of "licensing requirements for embryo research projects and fertility clinics, restrictions on the commodification of eggs and sperm, and measures to prevent proprietary interests from monopolizing access to stem cell lines" in international cloning regulations has been proposed, albeit e.g. effective oversight mechanisms or cloning requirements have not been described.

==== Cloning extinct and endangered species ====
Cloning, or more precisely, the reconstruction of functional DNA from extinct species has, for decades, been a dream. Possible implications of this were dramatized in the 1984 novel Carnosaur and the 1990 novel Jurassic Park. The best current cloning techniques have an average success rate of 9.4 percent (and as high as 25 percent when working with familiar species such as mice,) (Note: One news article in 2014 reported success rates of 70-80 percent for cloning pigs by BGI, a Chinese company and in another news article in 2015 a Korean Company, Sooam Biotech, claimed 40 percent success rates with cloning dogs) while cloning wild animals is usually less than 1 percent successful.

===== Conservation cloning =====
Several tissue banks have come into existence, including the "Frozen zoo" at the San Diego Zoo, to store frozen tissue from the world's rarest and most endangered species. This is also referred to as "Conservation cloning".

Engineers have proposed a "lunar ark" in 2021 – storing millions of seed, spore, sperm and egg samples from Earth's contemporary species in a network of lava tubes on the Moon as a genetic backup. Similar proposals have been made since at least 2008. These also include sending human customer DNA, and a proposal for "a lunar backup record of humanity" that includes genetic information by Avi Loeb et al.

In 2020, the San Diego Zoo began a number of projects in partnership with the conservation organization Revive & Restore and the company Viagen to clone individuals of genetically impoverished endangered species. A Przewalski's horse was cloned from preserved tissue of a stallion whose genes are absent in the surviving populations of the species, which descend from twenty individuals. The clone, named Kurt, had been born to a domestic surrogate mother, and was partnered with a natural-born Przewalski's mare in order to socialize him with the species' natural behavior before being introduced to the Zoo's breeding herd. In 2023, a second clone of the original stallion, named Ollie, was born; this marked the first instance of multiple living clones of a single individual of an endangered species being alive at the same time. Also in 2020, a clone named Elizabeth Ann was produced of a female black-footed ferret that had no living descendants. While Elizabeth Ann became sterile due to secondary health complications, a pair of additional clones of the same individual, named Antonia and Noreen, were born to distinct surrogate mothers, and Antonia successfully reproduced later in the year.

===== De-extinction =====
One of the most anticipated targets for cloning was once the woolly mammoth, but attempts to extract DNA from frozen mammoths have been unsuccessful, though a joint Russo-Japanese team is currently working toward this goal. In January 2011, it was reported by Yomiuri Shimbun that a team of scientists headed by Akira Iritani of Kyoto University had built upon research by Dr. Wakayama, saying that they will extract DNA from a mammoth carcass that had been preserved in a Russian laboratory and insert it into the egg cells of an Asian elephant in hopes of producing a mammoth embryo. The researchers said they hoped to produce a baby mammoth within six years. The challenges are formidable. Extensively degraded DNA that may be suitable for sequencing may not be suitable for cloning; it would have to be synthetically reconstituted. In any case, with currently available technology, DNA alone is not suitable for mammalian cloning; intact viable cell nuclei are required. Patching pieces of reconstituted mammoth DNA into an Asian elephant cell nucleus would result in an elephant-mammoth hybrid rather than a true mammoth. Moreover, true de-extinction of the wooly mammoth species would require a breeding population, which would require cloning of multiple genetically distinct but reproductively compatible individuals, multiplying both the amount of work and the uncertainties involved in the project. There are potentially other post-cloning problems associated with the survival of a reconstructed mammoth, such as the requirement of ruminants for specific symbiotic microbiota in their stomachs for digestion.

Scientists at the University of Newcastle and University of New South Wales announced in March 2013 that the very recently extinct gastric-brooding frog would be the subject of a cloning attempt to resurrect the species.

Many such "de-extinction" projects are being championed by the non-profit Revive & Restore.

In 2022, scientists showed major limitations and the scale of challenge of genetic-editing-based de-extinction, suggesting resources spent on more comprehensive de-extinction projects such as of the woolly mammoth may currently not be well allocated and substantially limited. Their analyses "show that even when the extremely high-quality Norway brown rat (R. norvegicus) is used as a reference, nearly 5% of the genome sequence is unrecoverable, with 1,661 genes recovered at lower than 90% completeness, and 26 completely absent", complicated further by that "distribution of regions affected is not random, but for example, if 90% completeness is used as the cutoff, genes related to immune response and olfaction are excessively affected" due to which "a reconstructed Christmas Island rat would lack attributes likely critical to surviving in its natural or natural-like environment".

In a 2021 online session of the Russian Geographical Society, Russia's defense minister Sergei Shoigu mentioned using the DNA of 3,000-year-old Scythian warriors to potentially bring them back to life. The idea was described as absurd at least at this point in news reports and it was noted that Scythians likely weren't skilled warriors by default.

The idea of cloning Neanderthals or bringing them back to life in general is controversial but some scientists have stated that it may be possible in the future and have outlined several issues or problems with such as well as broad rationales for doing so.

====== Unsuccessful attempts ======
In 2001, a cow named Bessie gave birth to a cloned Asian gaur, an endangered species, but the calf died after two days. In 2003, a banteng was successfully cloned, followed by three African wildcats from a thawed frozen embryo. These successes provided hope that similar techniques (using surrogate mothers of another species) might be used to clone extinct species. Anticipating this possibility, tissue samples from the last bucardo (Pyrenean ibex) were frozen in liquid nitrogen immediately after it died in 2000. Researchers are also considering cloning endangered species such as the Giant panda and Cheetah.

In 2002, geneticists at the Australian Museum announced that they had replicated DNA of the thylacine (Tasmanian tiger), at the time extinct for about 65 years, using polymerase chain reaction. However, on 15 February 2005 the museum announced that it was stopping the project after tests showed the specimens' DNA had been too badly degraded by the (ethanol) preservative. On 15 May 2005 it was announced that the thylacine project would be revived, with new participation from researchers in New South Wales and Victoria. In 2022 Colossal Biosciences and University of Melbourne announced further efforts to de-extinct the Thylacine, creating the Thylacine Integrated Genetic Restoration Research (TIGRR) Lab, which claims it has made a series of significant advancements, including having produced a thylacine genome that is "more than 99.9-per-cent accurate".

In 2003, for the first time, an extinct animal, the Pyrenean ibex mentioned above was cloned, at the Centre of Food Technology and Research of Aragon, using the preserved frozen cell nucleus of the skin samples from 2001 and domestic goat egg-cells. The ibex died shortly after birth due to physical defects in its lungs.

=== Lifespan ===
After an eight-year project involving the use of a pioneering cloning technique, Japanese researchers created 25 generations of healthy cloned mice with normal lifespans, demonstrating that clones are not intrinsically shorter-lived than naturally born animals. Other sources have noted that the offspring of clones tend to be healthier than the original clones and indistinguishable from animals produced naturally.

Some posited that Dolly the sheep may have aged more quickly than naturally born animals, as she died relatively early for a sheep at the age of six. Ultimately, her death was attributed to a respiratory illness, and the "advanced aging" theory is disputed.

A 2016 study indicated that once cloned animals survive the first month or two of life they are generally healthy. However, early pregnancy loss and neonatal losses are still greater with cloning than natural conception or assisted reproduction (IVF). Current research is attempting to overcome these problems.

== In popular culture ==
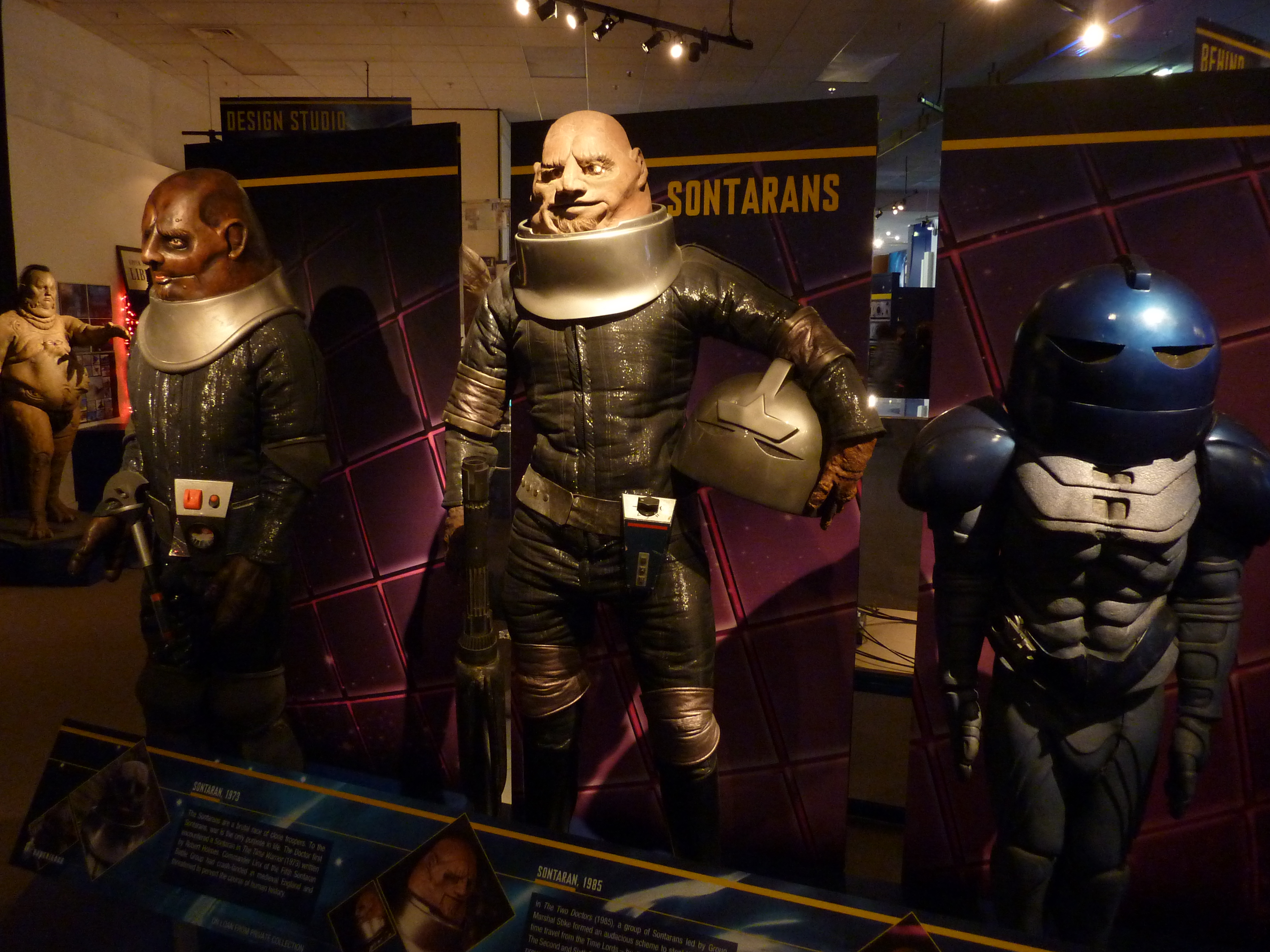
Sontarans in Doctor Who are a cloned warrior race.

Discussion of cloning in the popular media often presents the subject negatively. In an article in the 8 November 1993 article of Time, cloning was portrayed in a negative way, modifying Michelangelo's Creation of Adam to depict Adam with five identical hands. Newsweek's 10 March 1997 issue also critiqued the ethics of human cloning, and included a graphic depicting identical babies in beakers.

The concept of cloning, particularly human cloning, has featured a wide variety of science fiction works. An early fictional depiction of cloning is Bokanovsky's Process which features in Aldous Huxley's 1931 dystopian novel Brave New World. The process is applied to fertilized human eggs in vitro, causing them to split into identical genetic copies of the original. Following renewed interest in cloning in the 1950s, the subject was explored further in works such as Poul Anderson's 1953 story UN-Man, which describes a technology called "exogenesis", and Gordon Rattray Taylor's book The Biological Time Bomb, which popularised the term "cloning" in 1963.

Cloning is a recurring theme in a number of contemporary science fiction films, ranging from action films such as Anna to the Infinite Power, The Boys from Brazil, Jurassic Park (1993), Alien Resurrection (1997), The 6th Day (2000), Resident Evil (2002), Star Wars: Episode II – Attack of the Clones (2002), The Island (2005), Tales of the Abyss (2006), and Moon (2009) to comedies such as Woody Allen's 1973 film Sleeper.

The process of cloning is represented variously in fiction. Many works depict the artificial creation of humans by a method of growing cells from a tissue or DNA sample; the replication may be instantaneous, or take place through slow growth of human embryos in artificial wombs. In the long-running British television series Doctor Who, the Fourth Doctor and his companion Leela were cloned in a matter of seconds from DNA samples ("The Invisible Enemy", 1977) and then – in an apparent homage to the 1966 film Fantastic Voyage – shrunk to microscopic size to enter the Doctor's body to combat an alien virus. The clones in this story are short-lived, and can only survive a matter of minutes before they expire. Science fiction films such as The Matrix and Star Wars: Episode II – Attack of the Clones have featured scenes of human foetuses being cultured on an industrial scale in mechanical tanks.

Cloning humans from body parts is also a common theme in science fiction. Cloning features strongly among the science fiction conventions parodied in Woody Allen's Sleeper, the plot of which centres around an attempt to clone an assassinated dictator from his disembodied nose. In the 2008 Doctor Who story "Journey's End", a duplicate version of the Tenth Doctor spontaneously grows from his severed hand, which had been cut off in a sword fight during an earlier episode.

After the death of her beloved 14-year-old Coton de Tulear named Samantha in late 2017, Barbra Streisand announced that she had cloned the dog, and was now "waiting for [the two cloned pups] to get older so [she] can see if they have [Samantha's] brown eyes and her seriousness". The operation cost $50,000 through the pet cloning company Viagen.

In films such as Roger Spottiswoode's 2000 The 6th Day, which makes use of the trope of a "vast clandestine laboratory ... filled with row upon row of 'blank' human bodies kept floating in tanks of nutrient liquid or in suspended animation", clearly fear is to be incited. In Clark's view, the biotechnology is typically "given fantastic but visually arresting forms" while the science is either relegated to the background or fictionalised to suit a young audience. Genetic engineering methods are weakly represented in film; Michael Clark, writing for The Wellcome Trust, calls the portrayal of genetic engineering and biotechnology "seriously distorted"

In November 2025, former American football quarterback Tom Brady received a lot of criticism when he announced that his dog Junie is a clone of his late dog Lua.

=== Cloning and identity ===
Science fiction has used cloning, most commonly and specifically human cloning, to address questions of identity and eugenics. A Number is a 2002 play by English playwright Caryl Churchill which addresses the subject of human cloning and identity, especially nature and nurture. The story, set in the near future, is structured around the conflict between a father (Salter) and his sons (Bernard 1, Bernard 2, and Michael Black) –the second two of whom are clones of the first. A Number was adapted by Caryl Churchill for television, in a co-production between the BBC and HBO Films.

In 2012, a Japanese television series named "Bunshin" was created. The story's main character, Mariko, is a woman studying child welfare in Hokkaido. She grew up always doubtful about the love from her mother, who looked nothing like her and who died nine years before. One day, she finds some of her mother's belongings at a relative's house, and heads to Tokyo to seek out the truth behind her birth. She later discovered that she was a clone.

In the 2013 television series Orphan Black, cloning is used as a scientific study on the behavioral adaptation of the clones. In a similar vein, the book The Double by Nobel Prize winner José Saramago explores the emotional experience of a man who discovers that he is a clone.

=== Cloning as resurrection ===
Cloning has been used in fiction as a way of recreating historical figures. In the 1976 Ira Levin novel The Boys from Brazil and its 1978 film adaptation, Josef Mengele uses cloning to create copies of Adolf Hitler.

The Norman Spinrad's satirical The Iron Dream, published in 1972, concludes with 300 seven-foot-tall, blond, super-intelligent all-male SS clones in suspended animation launched into space to begin the Hitler analog's galactic empire in the aftermath of a genocidal race war. (They had won a Pyrrhic victory, the subhumans' leader having as his last act detonated a doomsday weapon, specifically a cobalt bomb, irredeemably contaminated the gene pool).

In Michael Crichton's 1990 novel Jurassic Park, which spawned a series of Jurassic Park feature films, the bioengineering company InGen develops a technique to resurrect extinct species of dinosaurs by creating cloned creatures using DNA extracted from fossils. The cloned dinosaurs are used to populate the Jurassic Park wildlife park for the entertainment of visitors. The scheme goes disastrously wrong when the dinosaurs escape their enclosures.

=== Cloning for warfare ===
The use of cloning for military purposes has also been explored in several fictional works. In Doctor Who, an alien race of armour-clad, warlike beings called Sontarans was introduced in the 1973 serial "The Time Warrior". Sontarans are depicted as squat, bald creatures who have been genetically engineered for combat. Their weak spot is a "probic vent", a small socket at the back of their neck which is associated with the cloning process. The concept of cloned soldiers being bred for combat was revisited in "The Doctor's Daughter" (2008), when the Doctor's DNA is used to create a female warrior called Jenny.

The 1977 film Star Wars was set against the backdrop of a historical conflict called the Clone Wars. The events of this war were not fully explored until the prequel films Attack of the Clones (2002) and Revenge of the Sith (2005), which depict a space war waged by a massive army of heavily armoured clone troopers that leads to the foundation of the Galactic Empire. Cloned soldiers are "manufactured" on an industrial scale, genetically conditioned for obedience and combat effectiveness. It is also revealed that the popular character Boba Fett originated as a clone of Jango Fett, a mercenary who served as the genetic template for the clone troopers.

=== Cloning for exploitation ===
A recurring sub-theme of cloning fiction is the use of clones as a supply of organs for transplantation. The 2005 Kazuo Ishiguro novel Never Let Me Go and the 2010 film adaptation are set in an alternate history in which cloned humans are created for the sole purpose of providing organ donations to naturally born humans, despite the fact that they are fully sentient and self-aware. The 2005 film The Island revolves around a similar plot, with the exception that the clones are unaware of the reason for their existence.

The exploitation of human clones for dangerous and undesirable work was examined in the 2009 British science fiction film Moon. In the futuristic novel Cloud Atlas and subsequent film, one of the story lines focuses on a genetically engineered fabricant clone named Sonmi~451, one of millions raised in an artificial "wombtank", destined to serve from birth. She is one of thousands created for manual and emotional labor; Sonmi herself works as a server in a restaurant. She later discovers that the sole source of food for clones, called 'Soap', is manufactured from the clones themselves.

In the film Us, at some point prior to the 1980s, the US Government creates clones of every citizen of the United States with the intention of using them to control their original counterparts, akin to voodoo dolls. This fails, as they were able to copy bodies, but unable to copy the souls of those they cloned. The project is abandoned and the clones are trapped exactly mirroring their above-ground counterparts' actions for generations. In the present day, the clones launch a surprise attack and manage to complete a mass-genocide of their unaware counterparts.

== See also ==
- Frozen Ark
- The President's Council on Bioethics
