= Whistle Blower (film) =

- Theatrical release poster
- Directed by: Yim Soon-rye
- Written by: Lee Chun-hyeong
- Produced by: Lee Choon-yeon; Nam Jung-il
- Starring: Park Hae-il; Yoo Yeon-seok; Lee Geung-young
- Cinematography: Park Young-jun
- Edited by: Kim Sun-min
- Music by: Lee Jun-oh
- Production company: Watermelon Pictures
- Distributed by: Megabox Plus M M-Line Distribution
- Release date: October 2, 2014 (South Korea)
- Running time: 114 minutes
- Country: South Korea
- Language: Korean

Whistle Blower (Korean: 제보자; RR: Jeboja) is a 2014 South Korean film directed by Yim Soon-rye.

Though fictionalized, the film is based on real-life scientist Hwang Woo-suk, who was at the center of one of the largest investigations of scientific fraud, named the Hwang affair, in recent memory. Hwang, then a professor of biotechnology at Seoul National University (SNU), gained international renown in 2004 after claiming that he had successfully carried out experiments cloning human embryonic stem cells. In 2005, an anonymous tip from whistleblower Ryu Young-joon, a former researcher at Hwang's lab, led to MBC program Producer's Note uncovering Hwang's ethical violations and fabricated data, which was confirmed by an SNU investigative panel in 2006. Hwang's research was discredited and in 2009, a South Korean court convicted him of embezzlement and bioethical violations.

== Plot ==
TV news producer Yoon Min-cheol is desperate for a scoop for his investigative journalism program PD Chase. One day, he receives a tip that The Newman Medical, the biggest sterility clinic in Korea, buys ova illegally. But while investigating, he is shocked to discover that scientist Lee Jang-hwan seems to be involved in the case. Lee had gained widespread acclaim and press attention following his groundbreaking experiments cloning human embryonic stem cells, and is considered a national hero whose research may mean the cure to several illnesses. As Yoon hesitates whether to pursue such a revered and powerful figure, he gets an anonymous call from Shim Min-ho, a young scientist who works for Lee's lab. Shim claims that Lee's stem cell research has largely been fabricated and unethical, and the two join forces to expose Lee's scientific fraud and bring the truth to the public, despite its disbelieving and harsh reaction.

== Cast ==
- Park Hae-il as Yoon Min-cheol
- Yoo Yeon-seok as Shim Min-ho
- Lee Geung-young as Lee Jang-hwan
- Park Won-sang as Lee Sung-ho
- Ryu Hyun-kyung as Kim Mi-hyeon
- Song Ha-yoon as Kim Yi-seul
- Kim Kang-hyeon as Lee Do-hyeong
- Kim Soo-an as Shim Soo-bin
- Kim Joong-ki as Priest Park
- Nam Myeong-ryeol as Professor Yoo Jong-jin
- Hwang Jae-won as Park Soo-hyeon
- Park Ji-so as Yoon Ji-ho
- Jang Gwang as President of broadcasting station
- Kwon Hae-hyo as General manager of broadcasting station
- Choi Yong-min as Minister of Science and Technology
- Han Gi-joong as Government administration director
- Jeon Su-ji as Researcher
- Kim Won-hae as Taxi driver in the middle of the night
- Lee Mi-do as Yoon Min-cheol's wife
- Kim Young-jae as Press conference moderator
- Hwang Jeong-min as Middle-aged woman in a shanty

== Box office ==
Upon its release on October 2, 2014, Whistle Blower topped the box office on its three-day opening weekend, with 563,539 admissions and a gross of ₩4.5 billion (US$4.2 million). It dropped to third place on its second and third weeks, earning ₩12.1 billion (US$11.3 million) from 1.7 million admissions.

== Awards and nominations ==
Year	Award	Category	Recipient	Result
2014	34th Korean Association of Film Critics Awards	Critics' Top 10	Whistle Blower	Won
2014	51st Grand Bell Awards	Best Film	Whistle Blower	Nominated
2014	51st Grand Bell Awards	Best Director	Yim Soon-rye	Nominated
2014	51st Grand Bell Awards	Best Actor	Park Hae-il	Nominated
2014	51st Grand Bell Awards	Best Supporting Actor	Lee Geung-young	Nominated
2014	51st Grand Bell Awards	Best Editing	Kim Sun-min	Nominated
2014	35th Blue Dragon Film Awards	Best Film	Whistle Blower	Nominated
2014	35th Blue Dragon Film Awards	Best Director	Yim Soon-rye	Nominated
2014	35th Blue Dragon Film Awards	Best Actor	Park Hae-il	Nominated
2014	35th Blue Dragon Film Awards	Best Supporting Actor	Lee Geung-young	Nominated
2015	20th Chunsa Film Art Awards	Best Screenplay	Lee Chun-hyeong	Nominated
2015	51st Baeksang Arts Awards	Best Supporting Actor	Lee Geung-young	Nominated
2015	51st Baeksang Arts Awards	Best Screenplay	Lee Chun-hyeong	Nominated
