= PD Note =

South Korean TV series

- Also known as: Producer's Note
- Genre: Investigative journalism Current affairs
- Presented by: Jeon Jong-hwan; Seo Jung-moon
- Country of origin: South Korea
- Original language: Korean
- No. of episodes: 1395

Production
- Producer: Park Sang-il
- Production location: South Korea
- Running time: 55 minutes
- Production company: MBC News (Public Affairs Group)

Original release
- Network: MBC
- Release: May 1, 1990 – present

Producer's Note or PD Note (Korean language: PD수첩) is an investigative journalism program on MBC in South Korea.

== Cases covered ==
=== Hwang affair ===
PD Note investigated Hwang Woo-suk in 2005, while he was still a star researcher who presented himself as making breakthroughs in human cloning and stem cell research. They aired a program accusing Hwang of ethical lapses in the procuring of eggs for research and fraud in misrepresenting their findings. As Hwang was a Korean national hero at the time, the program caused a massive backlash against MBC, leading to protests, a withdrawal of all 15 advertisers on the program, and a temporary suspension of the show. Part two of the program was not aired on the date that it had been planned. Additionally, the lead journalist had used some ethically dubious methods himself as part of the investigation, such as misrepresenting to one scientist that he was under criminal investigation, but honest answers would potentially get him out of trouble. As time passed and it became more clear that the accusations were true, MBC aired the second part of the show regardless on December 15, 2005, and the boycott subsided.

== See also ==
- 2008 US beef protest in South Korea
- South Korean illegal surveillance incident
- The Hankyoreh
