= King of Clones =

2023 documentary concerning the ethics of cloning

- Genre: Science documentary
- Directed by: Aditya Thayi
- Composer: Dan Deacon
- Country of origin: United Kingdom
- Original languages: Korean; English (Note: With some dialogue in Arabic and Russian.)
- No. of episodes: 1

Production
- Executive producers: Kavitha de Silva Wijeyeratne; Aditya Thayi
- Producer: Syahirah A. Karim
- Running time: 85 minutes
- Production company: Peddling Pictures

Original release
- Network: Netflix
- Release: 23 June 2023

King of Clones is a documentary released on Netflix and directed by Aditya Thayi which examines the Hwang affair involving human cloning by South Korean scientist Hwang Woo-suk.

== Description ==
The documentary is described by Netflix as "After rocking the world with work in human cloning, a scientist falls from grace. Now, he's back -- this time with pets and extinct species."

== Release ==
The film was released on 23 June 2023 by Netflix.

== Production ==
King of Clones was directed by London-based Singaporean filmmaker Aditya Thayi via and is a Netflix U.K. commission. Thayi has 20 nominations and five wins at the Asian Television Awards, including two wins for best direction. Thayi described Hwang as a "polarizing figure" in South Korea and wanted to do an objective take on him."

According to Variety, Thayi learned about Hwang due to anxiety he had waiting for the birth of his child, due to growing up in India in the 1980s where multiple industrial disasters occurred affecting children's health. He looked into getting genetic testing done and "was amazed by the choices that modern science has put in the hands of prospective parents and the complex ethical questions it raised." He then learned of Dr. Hwang and the hope that his stem cell research gave to parents, and believed "this story could touch upon the areas of science I personally wanted to explore and went on a mad ride with it... We set out to make a film about what happens when the domain of the Gods intersects the domain of scientists and Hwang’s life gave us the material to speak of the various themes we wanted to touch upon." Thayi wrote to Hwang for nine months before getting access.

Hwang told Thayi that he gets about 50 interview requests a month from news organizations, but turns all of them down. Thayi told Variety "I went into this film thinking that I was going to find a crazy monster in the science, but I find that the science – there’s nothing really wrong with it, it’s pretty solid. I think it’s just as human beings, we’ve not really had discussions about where the science can take us... It has been possible to clone a human being for at least 10 years, the scientific ability is there, it’s just that somebody somewhere has to just do it. And then you’ll have to reckon with it. But I fear that we’ve not really spent so much time thinking about it."

== Reception ==
In a pre-release article, Variety reported that this would be a "sensational documentary film featuring unprecedented access to South Korean scientist Hwang Woo-suk... Hwang’s rise to prominence started with his successful cloning of cows and pigs. In 2002, Hwang embarked upon human cloning research and partnered with Moon Shin-yong, an obstetrician with expertise in in-vitro fertilization. Their collaboration led to a major announcement in 2004, claiming the successful cloning of human embryos, with the potential to cure some diseases. The announcement fueled a heated debate on bioethics, despite Hwang and Moon emphasizing that their work focused solely on therapeutic purposes and strongly opposing reproductive cloning."

The Daily Beast reported that the documentary "is a primer on the rise and fall of Hwang, a former superstar who currently plies his genetics trade in the United Arab Emirates, cloning camels for the rich and powerful, who covet them for both their attractiveness and their racing prowess." It also concluded that "King of Clones resounds as a plea for more rigorous cloning-research standards, especially considering that the Chinese have cloned two monkeys—meaning that, in effect, primates (including humans) are now duplicatable... Still, a more comprehensive examination would have benefited Thayi’s film, which generally serves as a surface-level portrait about a scientific advancement that could change the world for the better or the worse, and a man who knows how to wield it but can’t necessarily be trusted to do so." According to Hwang “Grief is the catalyst. It’s where our cloning process really begins.” King of Clones reinforces that notion by profiling interventional radiologist Dr. Alexander Ruebben, who was so distraught over the passing of his French bulldog Csillo that—like Barbra Streisand—he opted to have the pet cloned. Ruebben talks lovingly about his pooch and shakes off criticisms of his conduct in a manner similar to Hwang, who states, “You can’t ignore a path just because it’s reckless.”

Nicole Ackman of Readysteadycut.com explains that the film explores Hwang's scientific discoveries, falls from favor, and actions after the scandal, but it also explains what cloning is "complete with simple animations that can help even the least STEM-oriented person understand the basic science behind it." The review says that "Thayi shows several examples of cloning to demonstrate all of the possible uses that Hwang was working towards. From recreating a beloved pet to bringing back an extinct animal, the possibilities are seemingly endless. Some personal stories of those wanting something or someone cloned are pretty touching," but concludes that "While King of Clones does a great job condensing very complicated information into a succinct documentary, I wish it took more of a stance on the complex moral issues it brings to light."

Rolling Stone called the film "a cautionary tale of a Korean genetic researcher whose revolutionary findings proved too good to be true, and said that Thayi "uses methods both playful... and serious, sometimes melding these approaches into something ultimately quite human."

== See also ==
- Ethics of cloning
