= Gerald Schatten =

American biologist (born 1949)

- Born: 1949 (age 76–77); New York City
- Citizenship: USA
- Known for: Embryonic Stem Cell Research
- Scientific career
- Fields: imaging, cell biology, cell motility, cell architecture, human and other primates assisted reproductive technology (ART), reproductive and cell aging, cloning, transgenesis, and stem cells.
- Doctoral advisor: Daniel Mazia

Gerald Schatten (born 1949) is an American stem cell researcher with interests in cell, developmental, and reproductive biology. He is professor and vice-chair of obstetrics, gynecology and reproductive sciences and professor of cell biology and of bioengineering in the Schools of Medicine and Engineering at the University of Pittsburgh, where he is also director of the Division of Developmental and Regenerative Medicine at the university's school of medicine. Additionally, he is deputy director of the Magee-Women's Research Institute and director of the Pittsburgh Development Center.. He is a member of the NCI-designated University of Pittsburgh Cancer Center and the McGowan Institute for Regenerative Medicine.

== Early life and education ==
Schatten was born in 1949 in New York City and was educated in the public school system, including at Stuyvesant High School. He graduated with an A.B. in zoology from the University of California, Berkeley in 1971, where he also obtained his Ph.D. in cell and developmental biology.

== Academic career ==
Schatten was awarded a Rockefeller Foundation Postdoctoral Fellowship for 1976–1977 to conduct mentored research under the direction of Daniel Mazia at UC Berkeley. He was also awarded a postdoctoral fellowship at the German Cancer Research Center.

1976-1985 he was assistant professor, associate professor, full professor of biological sciences and molecular biophysics at Florida State University; while there, he received a National Institutes of Health Research Career Development Award.

From 1985 to 1997 he was professor of zoology, molecular biology, animal science and obstetrics-gynecology at the University of Wisconsin–Madison. Here he was also director of the Integrated Microscopy Resource and senior scientist at the Wisconsin National Primate Research Center and at the Waisman Center for Human Development.

From 1997 to 2001 he was professor and vice-chair of obstetrics and gynecology at the Oregon Health & Science University and professor of cell and developmental biology. He was also research director of OHSU's Center for Women's Health, as well as director of assisted reproductive technologies and scientist at the Oregon National Primate Research Center.

From 2001 to present he was professor and vice-chair of obstetrics, gynecology and reproductive sciences and professor of cell biology and physiology at the University of Pittsburgh, where he is also director of the Division of Developmental and Regenerative Medicine at the School of Medicine. Additionally, he is deputy director of the Magee-Women's Research Institute and director of the Pittsburgh Development Center.

Throughout his academic career, Schatten has also conducted research and taught at various other institutions. During 1985–1986, he was an instructor in molecular embryology of the mouse at the Cold Springs Harbor Laboratory and a resident instructor of embryology at the Marine Biological Laboratory at Woods Hole. From 1986 to 1987, he held a visiting professorship at the Hopkins Marine Station of Stanford University.

== Research ==
Schatten's research focuses on imaging, cell biology, cell motility, cell architecture, human and other primates assisted reproductive technology (ART), reproductive and cell aging, cloning, transgenesis, and stem cells. His research has been funded through the National Institutes of Health as well as the National Science Foundation, the United States Department of Agriculture, the United States Environmental Protection Agency, and the NASA.

Schatten's work has been published extensively in many journals, such as Science, Nature, Lancet, Nature Medicine, Nature Cell Biology, Journal of Cell Biology, Genetics, Development, Developmental Biology, Biology of Reproduction, Human Reproduction, and the Journal of Law, Medicine and Ethics.

=== Fertilization and reproduction ===
Schatten's work on fertilization examines the differential inheritance of cellular components contributed by the sperm and egg, respectively, as well as the program of oocyte activation and cell division during meiosis and mitosis. His group has demonstrated the importance of the sperm centrosome-centriole complex during mammalian fertilization (including humans), with the unexpected exception of rodents in which the centrosome is of maternal origin (see Selected Publications).

=== Imaging and microscopy ===
Schatten also made contributions to imaging and microscopy. In his first published paper, he demonstrated the utility of polylysine and other engineered peptides that could adhere to cells, embryos, and intracellular structures for various microscopic applications and purifications (see Selected Publications). This technology is now widely applied and has solved the problem of holding cells for imaging. His team also published findings on imaging calcium and other ion transients in egg, embryos and cells, as well as dynamic architectural alternations during fertilization and cell division (see Selected Publications).

=== Transgenesis and stem cells ===
His more recent research has focused on the use of human and primate stem cells to determine the potential of stem cell-based medical therapies and better understand cell and human development; the study of genetic versus epigenetic (environmental) causes for human disease; cloned transgenic disease modeling (using primates) (see Selected Publications).

=== Bioethical considerations ===
Schatten has also published on the topic of scientific ethics, including a 1998 piece on bio-ethical aspects of ART, "Art before Science?", in the Journal of Law, Medicine & Ethics as well as a 2002 article in Nature Cell Biology titled "Safeguarding ART". Soon after, Schatten helped expose cloning frauds both by the Raelians and by a Korean lab he had links to. More recently, in 2009, he commented on the utilities and limitations of human disease modeling in genetically modified monkeys in the journal Nature.

=== Research misbehavior ===
In 2005, Schatten came to widespread media attention when he broke off his 20-month collaboration with Hwang Woo-suk, a Korean stem cell researcher, after reporting first ethical, and later scientific, lapses. In 2004 and 2005, Hwang claimed that his lab at the Seoul National University had successfully extracted stem cells from cloned human embryos, a statement later proved false. Science retracted both the 2004 article, in which Schatten had no involvement, and the 2005 article, on which he was listed as an author, and which he helped publicize. Schatten also received money from Hwang. Schatten called for an investigation by his university, the University of Pittsburgh, in 2005. Finished in February 2006, the investigation committee concluded that "Dr. Schatten shirked these responsibilities, a serious failure that facilitated the publication of falsified experiments in Science magazine. While this failure would not strictly constitute research misconduct as narrowly defined by University of Pittsburgh policies, it would be an example of research misbehavior."

== Research mentoring ==
Schatten has trained twenty doctoral and thirty postdoctoral fellows and he serves as the president of UNESCO’s International Cell Research Organization, a body devoted exclusively to research career training and mentorship. As with his and the other two co-founders (Joan Hunt and Kelly Mayo) National Institute of Child Health and Human Development - Burroughs Wellcome Fund - Howard Hughes Medical Institute-sponsored "Frontiers in Reproduction" course at the Woods Hole laboratory, this endeavor brings physician-scientists together with non-clinical counterparts for full-time, side-by-side, hands-on research training. Also the Marine Biological Laboratory (MBL) the Advanced Training setting at Woods Hole, together with Jennifer Morgan (Regeneration; MBL), they co-founded and co-directed MBL's Frontiers in Stem Cells and Regeneration Regeneration Center; MBL; www.mbl.edu/education/special-topics-courses/frontiers-in-stem-cells-regeneration; Ina Dobrinski (Calgary) assumed the directorship when his term was over and Ken Muneoka (Texas Tech) preceded Dr. Morgan. With funding from several Institutes at the National Institutes of Health, he has Founded and Directed courses taught almost exclusively by Indigenous Scholars with all Trainees of Indigenous descent: Advancing Native American Diversity in Aging Research through Undergraduate Education; at Historically Black Colleges and Universities [HBCUs] and Hispanic Speaking Universities [HSIs] he has also founded and directed courses on COVID-19 [course director, Frontiers in emerging, re-emerging, and zoonotic diseases and disparities]; Frontiers in Substance Abuse Disorders during Pregnancy, Post-Partum and Pediatrics; Frontiers in Aging and Regeneration Research: Translating MSTEM in Aging Research from the Lab to the Clinic and Beyond; Frontiers in Stem Cells and Cancer; Advanced Laboratory Course.

== Awards and honors ==
Schatten's honors include: Stuyvesant High School's Biology Medal (1967); The Rockefeller Foundation postdoctoral fellowships (1976- 1977); Researcher, Deutsches Krebsforschungszentrum, Heidelberg. (1976–77; 1984); NIH Research Career Development (RCDA 1981–1986) and MERIT awards (1997-2008); Diplome D'Honneur, XXXVI Congres de l'Association Internationale du Cinema Scientifique, Paris (1983); the Purkinje Medal (2003) awarded by the Czech Academy of Sciences; Daniel Mazia Award from Stanford University's Hopkins Marine Station (2003); Elected Fellow (1997) and Delegate (2005) of the American Association for the Advancement of Science; Patrick Steptoe Medal of the British Fertility Society (2005); the Stem Cell and Policy Award from the Genetics Policy Institute (2005); Pioneer in Embryonic Stem Cell Research (2006) awarded by FrhESC at Stanford University and Council Member of the National Institute of Aging (2006). Doctor Honoris Causa (honorary doctorate) Awarded by President of Slovenia, University of Nova Gorica (2015). Human Fertilization Expert for Terrance Malick's movie Voyage of Life (Imax and theatrical versions; 2016); MBL Woods Hole FOUNDER'S AWARD October MBL's Frontiers in Stem Cells and Regeneration Course (2018); Johan Gregor Mendel Medal for Outstanding Contributions in Science (2019) at Mendel's Augustinian Abbey in Brno Czech Republic; the film 2021 Academy Award-nominated "Crip Camp" produced by President Barack Obama and First Lady Michelle Obama, documents the critical role of CAMP JENED, which empowered disabled youth leaders who later fought for and eventually saw enacted the AMERICANS WITH DISABILITIES ACT (www.netflix.com/title/81001496 ) documents the summer of 1971; Schatten was a counselor there in preceding years of 1969 and 1970. In July 2022, Schatten was awarded the NIH's Outstanding Mentor Award in Diversity, Equity, Inclusion, and Accessibility (DEIA; NOT-OD-22-057). Schatten has also lectured widely and testified for the United States Senate, The President's Council on Bioethics, and the United Nations.

== Selected publications ==
- Mazia D, Schatten G, Sale W (July 1975). "Adhesion of cells to surfaces coated with polylysine. Applications to electron microscopy". The Journal of Cell Biology. 66 (1): 198–200. doi:10.1083/jcb.66.1.198. PMC 2109515. PMID 1095595.
- Steinhardt R, Zucker R, Schatten G (July 1977). "Intracellular calcium release at fertilization in the sea urchin egg". Developmental Biology. 58 (1): 185–96. doi:10.1016/0012-1606(77)90084-7. PMC 4351706. PMID 326602.
- Schatten G (October 1994). "The centrosome and its mode of inheritance: the reduction of the centrosome during gametogenesis and its restoration during fertilization". Developmental Biology. 165 (2): 299–335. doi:10.1006/dbio.1994.1256. PMID 7958403.
- Luetjens CM, Payne C, Schatten G (April 1999). "Non-random chromosome positioning in human sperm and sex chromosome anomalies following intracytoplasmic sperm injection". Lancet. 353 (9160): 1240. doi:10.1016/S0140-6736(99)80059-2. PMID 10217087. S2CID 9286761.
- Hewitson L, Dominko T, Takahashi D, et al. (April 1999). "Unique checkpoints during the first cell cycle of fertilization after intracytoplasmic sperm injection in rhesus monkeys". Nature Medicine. 5 (4): 431–3. doi:10.1038/7430. PMID 10202934. S2CID 6564806.
- Simerly C, Zoran SS, Payne C, et al. (1 September 1999). "Biparental Inheritance of γ-Tubulin during Human Fertilization: Molecular Reconstitution of Functional Zygotic Centrosomes in Inseminated Human Oocytes and in Cell-free Extracts Nucleated by Human Sperm". Molecular Biology of the Cell. 10 (9): 2955–69. doi:10.1091/mbc.10.9.2955. PMC 25540. PMID 10473639.
- Sutovsky P, Moreno RD, Ramalho-Santos J, Dominko T, Simerly C, Schatten G (November 1999). "Ubiquitin tag for sperm mitochondria". Nature. 402 (6760): 371–2. Bibcode:1999Natur.402..371S. doi:10.1038/46466. PMID 10586873. S2CID 205054671.
- Chan AW, Dominko T, Luetjens CM, et al. (January 2000). "Clonal propagation of primate offspring by embryo splitting". Science. 287 (5451): 317–9. Bibcode:2000Sci...287..317C. doi:10.1126/science.287.5451.317. PMID 10634789.
- Schatten G, Hewitson L, Simerly C, Sutovsky P, Huszar G (1998). "Cell and molecular biological challenges of ICSI: ART before science?". The Journal of Law, Medicine & Ethics. 26 (1): 29–37, 3. doi:10.1111/j.1748-720X.1998.tb01903.x. PMID 11067583. S2CID 9118764.
- Chan AW, Chong KY, Martinovich C, Simerly C, Schatten G (January 2001). "Transgenic monkeys produced by retroviral gene transfer into mature oocytes". Science. 291 (5502): 309–12. Bibcode:2001Sci...291..309C. doi:10.1126/science.291.5502.309. PMID 11209082.
- Simerly C, Dominko T, Navara C, et al. (April 2003). "Molecular correlates of primate nuclear transfer failures". Science. 300 (5617): 297. doi:10.1126/science.1082091. PMID 12690191. S2CID 19363117.
- Schatten G, Prather R, Wilmut I (January 2003). "Cloning claim is science fiction, not science". Science. 299 (5605): 344b–344. doi:10.1126/science.299.5605.344b. PMID 12532976. S2CID 1560085.
- Schatten GP (October 2002). "Safeguarding ART". Nature Cell Biology. 4 Suppl: s19–22. doi:10.1038/ncb-nm-fertilityS19. PMID 12479610.
- Schatten G, Smith J, Navara C, Park JH, Pedersen R (June 2005). "Culture of human embryonic stem cells". Nature Methods. 2 (6): 455–63. doi:10.1038/nmeth0605-455. PMID 16170868. S2CID 1481533.
- Schatten G, Mitalipov S (May 2009). "DEVELOPMENTAL BIOLOGY: Transgenic primate offspring". Nature. 459 (7246): 515–6. Bibcode:2009Natur.459..515S. doi:10.1038/459515a. PMC 2777739. PMID 19478771.
