= Stemagen =

Stemagen is a corporation headed by Dr. Samuel Wood. It is notable for cloning adult skin cells.

In January 2008, Dr. Andrew French, Stemagen's chief scientific officer and Wood in California, announced that they successfully created the first 5 mature human embryos using DNA from adult skin cells, aiming to provide a less-controversial source of viable embryonic stem cells. Dr. Wood and a colleague donated skin cells, and DNA from those cells was transferred to human eggs. It is not clear if the embryos produced would have been capable of further development, but Dr. Wood stated that if that were possible, using the technology for reproductive cloning would be both unethical and illegal. The 5 cloned embryos, created in Stemagen Corporation lab, in La Jolla, were later destroyed to confirm the nuclear transfer process.

Dr. French, lead author, and five other researchers published their findings in the online research journal Stem Cells, in an article entitled Development of human cloned blastocysts following somatic cell nuclear transfer (SCNT) with adult fibroblasts.

== See also ==
- Dr. Samuel Wood
- Human cloning
