= Tianjin animal cloning center =

The Tianjin animal cloning center was planned in 2015 and "to be put into use in the first half of 2016" in the Tianjin Economic-Technological Development Area of Tianjin, China, but as of 2022, no opening has been reported.

== Development ==
The factory was announced to be developed by Sinica, a subsidiary of the Chinese company Boyalife, along with the Institute of Molecular Medicine at Peking University, the Tianjin International Joint Academy of Biomedicine, and the Sooam Bioengineering Research Institute in South Korea.

== Facility and operations ==
The 14,000-square-metre facility would have hosted a laboratory, a cloning center, a gene bank, and educational exhibits for the public. The consortium planned to spend 200 million RMB (US$31 million) to produce 100,000 cloned cattle per year for China's rapidly growing beef market, and then expand to one million cattle per year (China planned to buy one million head of cattle from Australia in 2016 at a cost of US$2 billion). In addition to cows, the factory had planned to clone many different types of animals, including dogs, horses, and endangered and extinct animals.

== See also ==
- Beijing Genomics Institute (BGI)
- Stem cell laws and policy in China
