= Samuel H. Wood =

US scientist & fertility specialist who became the first man to clone himself

- Education: Loma Linda University (B.A.); University of Richmond (M.A.); Medical College of Virginia (M.D., Ph.D.); San Diego State University (MBA)
- Known for: First man to clone himself

Samuel H. Wood is a scientist and fertility specialist. In 2008, he became the first man to clone himself, donating his own DNA via somatic cell nuclear transfer (SCNT) to produce mature human embryos that were his clones.

== Education and early research ==
Wood completed undergraduate studies in psychology at Loma Linda University in 1979. His graduate training includes a M.A. in psychology from the University of Richmond (1980), an M.D. (1985) and a Ph.D. (1986) from Medical College of Virginia, and an MBA from San Diego State University (1997).

Wood's early scholarship laid the foundation for his future scientific endeavors, beginning with an initial focus on DNA. While attending the Medical College of Virginia, Wood researched isolating a DNA nuclear matrix of HeLa cells using a poly(dT) template. He and his colleagues discovered that HeLa cell primase in these cells is in a bound form and they determined the presence of multiple forms of polymerase α. Wood further studied DNA, in the form of nucleoids, while in his clinical residency in Obstetrics and Gynecology at the University of North Carolina at Chapel Hill. The properties of two types of "subnuclear systems" (preparations of non-DNased-digested nuclei vs. DNased-digested nuclei) were differentiated along with their respective ability to retain elongation in response to increasing concentrations of salt.

Wood then turned his attention to treating premenstrual syndrome (PMS) as well as improving pregnancy rates when using donated eggs. During a fellowship in reproductive endocrinology and infertility, Wood studied the usefulness of fluoxetine (tradename Prozac or Sarafem) for patients experiencing severe PMS. He and his research team found this medication significantly reduced behavioral and physical symptoms during the luteal phase without suffering significant side effects or treatment complications. The collaborators subsequently investigated the efficacy of RU 486 (commonly referred to as "the abortion pill") in treating PMS but found symptoms experienced with administration of low-dose RU 486 to be virtually indistinguishable from subjects receiving a placebo.

Upon opening a private practice, Wood continued to expand the knowledge base in the field of infertility. He and his team analyzed data over a 5-year period for both fresh and frozen egg donation cases with and without use of a gestational surrogate. They found a previously undiscovered "uterine factor" to consider when egg donation resulted in repeated pregnancy failure. Furthermore, they found successful implantation rates were significantly higher for surrogates in both fresh and frozen embryo transfers. Additionally, surrogates showed a significantly higher pregnancy rate following frozen embryo transfers than their non-surrogate counterparts.

== Cloning ==
Wood entered the arena of stem cell research shortly after the first published study of nuclear transfer stem cells (NTSC), also known as human therapeutic cloning, was withdrawn when the principal author's claims were called into question due to falsified data and ethical deviation from scientific research standards. Australian scientist Andrew French, best known for his work with somatic cell nuclear transfer (SCNT) in the mammalian reproduction process, co-investigated with Wood and French's Australian colleague, Alan Trounson. Based on meticulous mammalian study review, the researchers concluded that the rigorous procedures developed for mammalian reproduction held promise for practical application in human embryonic stem cell (hESC) line production. Furthermore, they specifically proposed hESC research should steer away from attempting to produce viable offspring, focusing efforts on the use of cloned embryos as a viable source for deriving stem cell lines instead.

In 2008, Wood created embryo copies of himself by placing his skin cells in a woman's egg, marking the first time anyone had done so with adult skin cells. The five cloned embryos were later destroyed. In January 2008, Wood and Andrew French, Stemagen's chief scientific officer in California, announced that they had successfully created the first five mature human embryos using DNA from adult skin cells, aiming to provide a less-controversial source of viable embryonic stem cells. Wood and a colleague donated skin cells and the DNA from those cells was transferred into human eggs. It is not clear if the embryos produced would have been capable of further development, but Wood stated that if that were possible, using the technology for reproductive cloning would be both unethical and illegal. The five cloned embryos, created in Stemagen Corporation lab in La Jolla, were later destroyed.

Wood and five other researchers published their findings in the online research journal Stem Cells in an article entitled Development of Human cloned Blastocyst Following Somatic Cell Nuclear Transfer (SCNT) with Adult Fibroblasts.

== See also ==
- Human cloning
