= Hwang Woo-suk =

Discredited South Korean scientist (born 1953)

- Hwang in 2004
- Born: January 29, 1953 (age 73); Buyeo County, South Chungcheong Province, South Korea
- Citizenship: South Korea (1953–2026); United Arab Emirates (2026–present)
- Education: Seoul National University (BS, MS, PhD)

Korean name
- Hangul: 황우석
- Hanja: 黃禹錫
- RR: Hwang Useok
- MR: Hwang Usŏk

Hwang Woo-suk (Korean: 황우석; born January 29, 1953) is a South Korea-born Emirati veterinarian and researcher. He was a professor of theriogenology and biotechnology at Seoul National University until he was dismissed on March 20, 2006. He was considered a pioneering expert in stem cell research and even called the "Pride of Korea". However, he became infamous around November 2005 for fabricating a series of stem cell experiments that were published in high-profile journals in a case known as the Hwang affair.

Hwang was best known for two articles published in the journal Science in 2004 and 2005, where he reported he had succeeded in creating human embryonic stem cells by cloning. However, soon after the first paper was released, an article in the journal Nature accused Hwang of having committed ethical violations by using eggs from his graduate students and from the black market. Although he denied the charges at first, Hwang admitted the allegations were true in November 2005. Shortly after this, data from his human cloning experiments was revealed to have been falsified.

On May 12, 2006, Hwang was charged with embezzlement and bioethics law violations after it emerged much of his stem cell research had been faked. The Korea Times reported on June 10, 2007, that Seoul National University fired him, and the South Korean government canceled his financial support and barred him from engaging in stem cell research. Hwang was sentenced to a two years suspended prison sentence at the Seoul Central District Court on 26 October 2009, after being found guilty of embezzlement and bioethical violations but cleared of fraud. On the same day, CNN reported that the scientist in 2006 had admitted faking his findings after questions of impropriety had emerged. He had his conviction upheld but his suspended sentence reduced by 6 months on 15 December 2010 by an appeals court in South Korea. In 2014, the South Korean Supreme Court upheld its 2010 ruling.

Since the controversy, Hwang has maintained a relatively low profile, but continues to work in scientific fields. As of September 2020, he worked at the Sooam Bioengineering Research Institute in Yongin, Gyeonggi Province, leading research efforts into creating cloned pig embryos and embryonic stem cell lines. In February 2011, Hwang visited Libya as part of a US$133 million project in the North African country to build a stem cell research center and transfer relevant technology. The project was canceled due to the 2011 Libyan civil war. In November 2015, a Chinese biotech company Boyalife Group announced that it would partner with Hwang's laboratory, Sooam Biotech, to open the world's largest animal cloning factory in Tianjin. The factory would aim to produce up to one million cattle embryos per year to meet the increasing demand for quality beef in China.

== Timeline ==
Hwang first caught media attention in South Korea when he announced he had successfully created a cloned dairy cow, Yeongrong-i in February 1999. His alleged success was touted as the fifth instance in the world in cow cloning, with a notable caveat: Hwang failed to provide scientifically verifiable data for the research, giving only media sessions and photo ops. Hwang's next claim came in April 1999, when he announced the cloning of a Korean cow, Jin-i, also without providing any scientifically verifiable data. Despite the notable absence of any of the scientific data needed to probe the validity of the research, Hwang's several claims were well received by the South Korean media and public, who were attracted by Hwang's claim of immeasurable economic prospect that his research was said to be promising. The claims of his research results resulted in him being awarded the Scientist of the Year Award by the Korea Science Journalists Association and the Inchon Award. Until 2004, Hwang's main area of research remained in creating genetically modified livestock that included cows and pigs. During that period, Hwang claimed to have created a BSE-resistant cow (which has not been verified), and also stated his intention to clone a Siberian tiger.

In February 2004, Hwang and his team announced that they had successfully created an embryonic stem cell by the somatic cell nuclear transfer method, and published their paper in the March 12 issue of Science. Although Hwang had already established himself as an expert in animal cloning and secured celebrity status in South Korea in the late 1990s, his alleged sudden success came as a surprise because this was the first reported success in human somatic cell cloning. Until Hwang's claim, it was generally agreed that creating a human stem cell by cloning was next to impossible due to the complexity of primates. Hwang explained that his team used 242 eggs to create a single cell line.

In May, Nature journal published an article stating that Hwang had used eggs taken from two of his graduate students, based on an interview with one of the students. The article raised the question of whether the students might have been pressured to give eggs and thus whether such a donation would have been "voluntary" as Hwang claimed in his scientific paper. At that time, Hwang denied that he had used his students' eggs.

Hwang's team announced an even greater achievement a year later in May 2005, and claimed they had created 11 human embryonic stem cells using 185 eggs. His work, published in the June 17 issue of Science, was instantly hailed as a breakthrough in biotechnology because the cells were allegedly created with somatic cells from patients of different age and gender, while the stem cell of 2004 was created with eggs and somatic cells from a single female donor. This meant every patient could receive custom-made treatment with no immune reactions. In addition, Hwang's claim meant that his team had boosted their success rate by 14 times and that this technology could be medically viable.

Hwang made further headlines in May 2005 when he criticized U.S. President George W. Bush's policy on embryonic stem cell research. Also, Time magazine named Hwang one of its "People Who Mattered 2004", stating that Hwang "has already proved that human cloning is no longer science fiction, but a fact of life."

Following on the earlier success, on August 3, 2005, Hwang announced that his team of researchers had become the first team to successfully clone a dog, which was independently verified through genetic testing. The dog, an Afghan Hound, was named Snuppy.

Shortly after his groundbreaking 2005 work, Hwang was appointed to head the new World Stem Cell Hub, a facility that was to be the world's leading stem cell research center. However, in November 2005, Gerald Schatten, a University of Pittsburgh researcher who had worked with Hwang for two years, made the surprise announcement that he had ceased his collaboration with Hwang. In an interview, Schatten commented that "my decision is grounded solely on concerns regarding oocyte (egg) donations in Hwang's research reported in 2004." Following an intense media probe, Roh Sung-il, one of Hwang's close collaborators and head of MizMedi Women's Hospital, held a news conference on November 21. During the conference, Roh admitted that he had paid women US$1,400 each for donating their eggs which were later used in Hwang's research. Roh claimed Hwang was unaware of this, while the South Korean Ministry of Health asserted that no laws or ethical guidelines had been breached as there were no commercial interests involved. Hwang maintained that he was unaware that the eggs had been obtained via these methods, but regardless resigned from his post at the World Stem Cell Hub.

On November 22, PD Su-cheop (Producer's Note), a popular MBC investigative reporting show, raised the possibility of unethical conduct in the egg cell-acquiring process. Despite the factual accuracy of the report, news media as well as people caught up in nationalistic fervor in their unwavering support for Hwang asserted that criticism of Hwang's work was "unpatriotic", so much so that the major companies who were sponsoring the show immediately withdrew their support.

On November 24, Hwang held a press conference in Seoul, in which he declared his intention of resigning from most of his official posts. He also apologized for his actions and said, "I was blinded by work and my drive for achievement." He denied coercing his researchers into donating eggs and claimed that he found out about the situation only after it had occurred. He added that he had lied about the source of the eggs donated to protect the privacy of his female researchers, and that he was not aware of the Declaration of Helsinki, which clearly enumerates his actions as a breach of ethical conduct. After the press conference, which was aired on all major South Korean television networks, many of the nation's media outlets, government ministries, and members of the public expressed sympathy for Hwang.

In mid-December, co-author of Hwang's papers came forward, telling the media that Hwang had confessed to fabricating evidence for nine of the eleven cell lines. He (Dr Roh Il-Sung) reportedly said he had doubts about the remaining two lines.

On December 29, 2005, the university determined that all 11 of Hwang's stem cell lines were fabricated. The university announced on January 10, 2006, that Hwang's 2004 and 2005 papers in Science were both fabricated. Following on the confirmation of scientific misconduct, on January 11, Science unconditionally retracted both of Hwang's papers.

On January 12, 2006, Hwang held a press conference to apologize for the fiasco, but did not admit to cheating. Instead, he blamed other members of his research project for having deceived him with false data and alleged a conspiracy, saying that his projects had been sabotaged and that there was theft of materials involved. He said that cloning human stem cells was possible and that he had the technology to do it, and if he were given six more months he could prove it. This is an extension of the ten days he said he needed to re-create the stem cells that he asked for back on December 16, 2005. Seoul prosecutors started a criminal investigation and raided Hwang's home that day.

On January 20, 2006, Hwang maintained that two of his 11 forged stem cell lines had been maliciously switched for cells from regular, not cloned, embryos. The allegation involves the lines Hwang claims to have created at Seoul-based MizMedi Hospital.

On November 22, 2016, Hwang received a certificate of patent on NT-1 technology from the Korean Intellectual Property Office.

== Hwang's laboratory technique ==
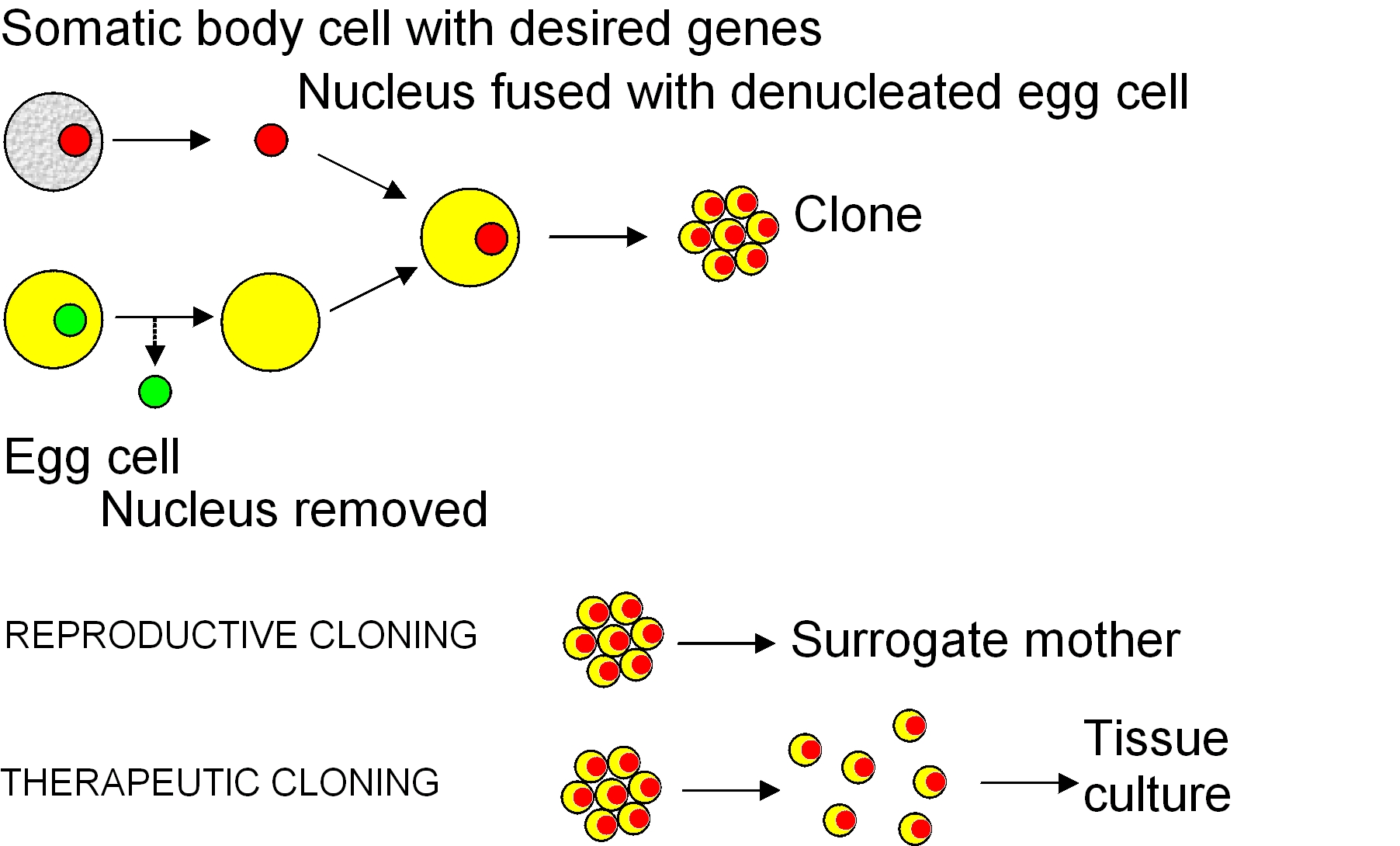
Somatic cell nuclear transfer can create clones for both reproductive and therapeutic purposes. The diagram depicts the removal of the donor nucleus for schematic purposes; in practice the whole donor cell is transferred.

In the late 1990s, the method that scientists used in cloning was somatic cell nuclear transfer, which is the same procedure that was used to create Dolly the sheep. This laboratory technique begins when an egg is taken from a donor and the nucleus is removed from the egg, creating an enucleated egg. A cell, which contains DNA, is then taken from the animal being cloned. The enucleated egg is then fused together with the nucleus of the cloning subject's cell using electricity. This creates an embryo, which is implanted into a surrogate mother through in vitro fertilization. If the procedure is successful, then the surrogate mother will give birth to a baby that is a clone of the cloning subject at the end of a normal gestation period. In 2014 researchers were reporting cloning success rates of seven to eight out of ten but in 1996 it took 277 attempts to create Dolly.

Hwang allegedly used this technique at his laboratory in SNU to clone dogs during his experiments throughout the early 2000s. He claimed that it was possible to clone mammals and that probability for success can be better than 1 in 277 attempts (as in similar cases such as Dolly). Hwang was the first in the world to clone a dog, an Afghan hound called Snuppy in 2005. He described his procedure for cloning in the journal Nature. Researchers from the Seoul National University and the US National Institutes of Health confirmed that Snuppy was a clone. Since then Hwang and his associates have cloned many more dogs. In 2015, it was reported that Huang Woo-suk's company Sooam Biotech had produced 700 cloned puppies since 2005, with their owners paying about $100,000 each to have their dogs cloned.

Hwang's intention to develop better technique for cloning was focused on stem cells because they are still at an early stage of development and retain the potential to turn into many different types of cell and when they divide, each new cell has the potential to either remain a stem cell or become another type of cell with a more specialized function.

According to stem cell biologists, it might be possible to harness this ability to turn stem cells into a super "repair kit" for the body, theoretically to use stem cells to generate healthy tissue to replace that either damaged by trauma or compromised by disease. The many conditions and illnesses that may eventually be treated by stem cell therapy include Parkinson's disease, Alzheimer's disease, heart disease, stroke, arthritis, diabetes, burns, and spinal cord damage.

In March 2012, it was announced that Hwang would collaborate with Russian scientists in an attempt to clone a woolly mammoth from remains found in Siberia. He had previously successful cloned eight coyotes in March 2011 using domestic dogs and grey wolves as surrogate mothers. However no mammoth sample fit for cloning had been found as of 2015.

In 2015, the Chinese company BoyaLife announced that in partnership with the Hwang Woo-suk's company Sooam Biotech, they were planning to build a 200 million RMB (about US$32 million) factory in Tianjin, China to produce 100,000 cloned cattle per year to supply China's growing market for quality beef, starting in 2016.

In 2015, Sooam Biotech cloned a male boxer puppy from a pet dog that had been dead for 12 days. This was the first time they had cloned a dog that had been dead for such a long time.

In 2016, Hwang's company was regularly cloning pigs which were genetically predisposed to certain diseases so that they could be used for testing pharmaceuticals, and cloning cattle which were highly valued for their meat. In total Sooam Biotech was reported to be producing roughly 500 cloned embryos a day from various species. They were also reported to be attempting to clone the Ethiopian wolf, one of the world's rarest canids, of which there are only 500 in the wild, another endangered canid, the dhole, of which there only about 2,500 adults, and the Siberian musk deer, which is classified as vulnerable by the IUCN.

== Controversies ==
Until late November 2005, Hwang was criticized only for unpublicized ethical violations. Colleagues and media outlets asserted that he had paid female donors for egg donations and that he had received donations from two junior researchers, both of which were violations. Later controversies centered around scientific misconduct.

His team, which cloned the first human embryo to use for research, said they had used the same technology to create batches of embryonic stem cells from nine patients. According to Hwang, the result was much more efficient than they had hoped. Hwang's integrity as a researcher was again put in doubt when it was revealed that PD Su-cheop had scheduled a follow-up report questioning his achievement published in Science in June 2005, which stated he had cloned 11 lines of embryonic stem cells. This caused furious backlash among many South Koreans, and the reaction only intensified when it was discovered that Kim Sun-Jong, one of Hwang's researchers from MizMedi, had been coerced by illegal means to testify against Hwang. As a result, the scheduled broadcast was canceled and the network made a public apology to the nation, everyone more or less operating under the assumption that the show was at fault and not Hwang. Yet, other news outlets began to question Hwang's claims.

Close scrutiny revealed that several of the photos of purportedly different cells were in fact photos of the same cell. Hwang responded that these additional photos were accidentally included and that there was no such duplication in the original submission to Science. This was later confirmed by the journal.

Researchers raised questions about striking similarities between the DNA profiles of the cloned cells. Then collaborator Gerald Schatten asked Science to remove his name from the paper, stating as a reason that there were "allegations from someone involved with the experiments that certain elements of the report may be fabricated."

In the midst of national confusion, Hwang disappeared from public sight, to be hospitalized days later for alleged stress-related fatigue, while public opinion gradually began to turn against Hwang with even the major Korean companies who had withdrawn their support from PD Su-cheop reportedly now less than pleased with Hwang. Days later, Hwang started going to his laboratory while requesting Seoul National University to officially conduct a probe to the allegations surrounding him.

The scandal took a dramatic turn on December 15, when Roh Sung-il, who had collaborated on the disputed paper, stated to media outlets that nine of those eleven lines had been faked; specifically, DNA tests illustrated that those nine lines shared identical DNA, implying that they had come from the same source. Roh stated that "Professor Hwang admitted to fabrication", and that he, Hwang, and another co-author had asked Science to withdraw the paper. Adding fuel to the fire, MBC broadcast the content of the canceled PD Su-cheop show, which substantiated Roh's claim.

On the same day, The Seattle Times reported that Science had not yet received an official request from Hwang to withdraw the paper, and it had refused to remove Schatten's name from the paper, stating, "No single author, having declared at the time of submission his full and complete confidence in the contents of the paper, can retract his name unilaterally, after publication."

Several prominent scientists, including Ian Wilmut, who cloned Dolly the sheep in 1996, and Bob Lanza, a cloning expert based in Worcester, Massachusetts, did call on Hwang to submit his paper to an outside group for independent analysis. Lanza noted, "You can't fake the results if they're carried out by an independent group. I think this simple test could put the charges to rest."

Two major press conferences were held on Korean television networks on December 16, one with Hwang, followed by one with his former colleague, Roh Sung-il. Hwang started his press conference by claiming that the technology to make stem cells existed—not an explicit denial that the stem cell lines he used in his paper to Science were fakes. He, however, acknowledged the falsifications of research data in the paper, attributing them to unrecoverable "artificial mistakes". He said that there was a problem with the original lines caused by contamination, and if he were given ten more days he could re-create the stem cell lines. He accused Kim Sun-Jong, a former collaborator, of "switching" some of the stem cell lines.

Despite Hwang's claim, in another press conference held only minutes later, Roh Sung-il rebutted Hwang's accusation, saying Hwang was blackmailing MizMedi and Kim Sun-jong. He maintained that at least nine of the eleven stem cell lines were fakes and that Hwang was simply untrustworthy.

"Roh Sung-il, chairman of the board at Mizmedi Hospital, told KBS television that Hwang had agreed to ask the journal Science to withdraw the paper, published in June to international acclaim. Roh was one of the co-authors of the article that detailed how individual stem cell colonies were created for 11 patients through cloning. Roh also told MBC television that Hwang had pressured a former scientist at his lab to fake data to make it look like there were 11 stem cell colonies. In a separate report, a former researcher told MBC that Hwang ordered him to fabricate photos to make it appear there were 11 separate colonies from only three. [...] University of Pittsburgh researcher Gerald Schatten has already asked that Science remove him as the senior author of the report, citing questions about the paper's accuracy. Seoul National University announced this week it would conduct an internal probe into Hwang's research."

Some scientists have started questioning Hwang's earlier work published in Science in February 2004, in which he claimed to have cloned embryonic stem cells. Maria Biotech head Park Se-pill said, "Up until now, I have believed Hwang did derive cloned embryonic stem cells although he admitted to misconduct in his follow-up paper on patient-specific stem cells...Now, I am not sure whether the cloned stem cell really existed."

On July 26, 2006, Hwang said in testimony that he spent part of 500 million won in private donations in attempts to clone extinct Russian mammoths and Korean tigers.

=== Official probe and confirmation of fraud ===
An internal panel was set up in Seoul National University to investigate the allegation, and the probe was started on December 17, 2005. The panel sealed off Hwang's laboratory and conducted a thorough investigation, collecting testimonies from Hwang, Roh and other people who were involved with the scandal. On December 23, the panel announced its initial finding that Hwang had intentionally fabricated stem cell research results creating nine fake cell lines out of eleven, and added that the validity of two remaining cell lines is yet to be confirmed. The panel stated that Hwang's misconduct is "a grave act damaging the foundation of science." Hwang's claim of having used only 185 eggs to create stem cell lines was also denied by the panel, which indicated that more eggs may have been used in the research process.

The panel announced additional findings on December 29, and confirmed that no patient-matched embryonic stem cells existed, and that Hwang's team did not have the scientific data to prove any of the stem cells had ever been made.

In its final report published on January 10, 2006, the panel reaffirmed its previous findings while announcing additional discoveries. The panel found out that, contrary to Hwang's claim of having used 185 eggs for his team's 2005 paper, at least 273 eggs were shown to have been used according to research records kept in Hwang's lab. In addition, the panel discovered that Hwang's team was supplied with 2,061 eggs in the period of November 28, 2002, to December 8, 2005. Hwang's claim of not having known about the donation of eggs by his own female researchers was also denied by the panel; in fact, it was discovered that Hwang himself had distributed egg donation consent forms to his researchers and personally escorted one to the MizMedi Hospital to perform the egg extraction procedure.

The panel stated that Hwang's 2004 Science paper was also fabricated and decided the stem cell discussed in the paper may have been generated by a case of parthenogenetic process (which is itself a significant development, as mammals rarely reproduce by parthenogenesis; in addition, this would make Hwang's lab the first ever to successfully generate human stem cells via parthenogenesis, predating other research facilities' successes). Although Hwang's team didn't rule out the possibility of parthenogenetic process in the paper, the panel said, his team didn't make any conscientious effort to probe the possibility through the tests available.

Chung Myunghee, the head of the panel, said at a news conference that the panel was not in a position to investigate Hwang's claim of his stem cells having been switched with MizMedi's, but added that such a claim was incomprehensible when there were no data to prove any of the stem cells were ever made to begin with.

However, the panel confirmed that Hwang's team had actually succeeded in cloning a dog they named Snuppy, as results from analyses of 27 markers that allowed distinguishing amongst extremely-inbred animals and of mitochondrial DNA sequencing indicated that Snuppy was a somatic cell clone of Tie (the dog who gave the somatic cells required for Snuppy, which were then inserted into the eggs of surrogate mothers whose nuclei had been removed), making Snuppy the first ever dog to be cloned.

The panel, in conclusion, stated that Hwang's team intentionally fabricated the data in both the 2004 and the 2005 papers, as described by Myung Hee Chung (Head of Seoul National University's investigation) and that it was an act of "deception of the scientific community and the public at large".

=== Resignation and the official dismissal ===
On December 23, 2005, Hwang apologized for "creating a shock and a disappointment" and announced that he was resigning his position as professor at the university. However, Hwang maintained that patient-matched stem cell technology remained in South Korea, and his countrymen would see it.

Seoul National University said Hwang's resignation request would not be accepted, citing a university regulation that dictates that an employee under investigation may not resign from a post, thus avoiding full retribution and possibly dismissal if found at fault, while benefiting from an honorable voluntary resignation.

On February 9, 2006, the university suspended Hwang's position as a professor, together with six other faculty members who participated in Hwang's team; Hwang was dismissed on March 20, 2006.

=== Indictment of Hwang and collaborators ===
On May 12, 2006, Hwang was indicted on charges of embezzlement and breach of the country's bioethics law, without physical detention. Prosecutors also brought fraud charges against the three stem cell researchers. He embezzled 2.8 billion won (US$3 million) out of some 40 billion won in research funds, for personal purposes and the illegal purchase of ova used in his experiments.

The prosecution also said Hwang's three associates involved in his stem cell research, Yoon Hyun-soo, Lee Byeong-chun and Kang Sung-keun, also misappropriated tens of millions of won in research money. Investigators have been tracking 24.6 billion won to find out how the research money was spent. It was part of Hwang's 36.9 billion won research funds raised through state support and private donations. Investigators said Hwang used bank accounts held by relatives and subordinates in 2002 and 2003 to receive about 475 million won from private organizations. He allegedly laundered the money by withdrawing it all in cash, breaking it up into smaller amounts and putting it back in various bank accounts. Hwang also withdrew 140 million won in August 2001 to buy gifts for his sponsors, including politicians and other prominent social figures, before Chusok holidays, according to prosecutors. He also allegedly misappropriated around 26 million won in research funds in September 2004 to buy a car for his wife. Hwang is suspected of embezzling 600 million won, provided by a private foundation, on multiple occasions from 2001 to 2005 for personal use. Prosecutors are also accusing him of illegally paying some 38 million won to 25 women who provided ova for his research through Hanna Women's Clinic in the first eight months of 2005. They also said Hwang gave several dozen politicians about 55 million won in political funds on numerous occasions from 2001 to 2005. He allegedly provided 14 million won to executives of large companies that provided financial support for his research. The prosecution added Hwang wired about 200 million won to a Korean American, identified only as Kang, in September 2005 and received the equivalent amount in U.S. currency from him when the scientist visited the United States two months later. Also in 2005, Hwang received one billion won each in research funds from SK Group and the National Agricultural Cooperative Federation based on his fabricated stem cell research results. Meanwhile, investigators said Lee Byeong-chun and Kang Sung-keun, both professors of veterinary science at Seoul National University, embezzled about 300 million won and 100 million won each in state funds by inflating research-related expenses. Yoon Hyun-soo, a biology professor at Hanyang University, also embezzled 58 million won from the research fund managed by MizMedi Hospital.

== Parthenogenesis ==
On August 2, 2007, after much independent investigation, it was revealed that Hwang's team succeeded in extracting cells from eggs that had undergone parthenogenesis. Hwang claimed he and his team had extracted stem cells from cloned human embryos. However, further examination of the cells' chromosomes shows the same indicators of parthenogenesis in those extracted stem cells as are found in the mice created by Tokyo scientists in 2004. Although Hwang deceived the world about being the first to create artificially cloned human embryos, he did contribute a major breakthrough to the field of stem cell research. The process may offer a way for creating stem cells that are genetically matched to a particular woman for the treatment of degenerative diseases.

The news of the breakthrough came just a month after an announcement from the International Stem Cell Corporation (ISC), a California-based stem cell research company, that they had successfully created the first human embryos through parthenogenesis. Although the actual results of Hwang's work were just published, those embryos were created by him and his team before February 2004, when the fabricated cloning results were announced, which would make them the first to successfully perform the process. Jeffrey Janus, president and director of research for ISC, agrees that "Dr. Hwang's cells have characteristics found in parthenogenetic cells" but remains cautious, saying "it needs more study."

== Responses ==
=== Government involvement ===
After having acquired a celebrity status in South Korea, Hwang actively sought to establish every possible tie to political and economic institutions in the country. Hwang especially tried to win favor from the Roh Moo-hyun government, which in turn was suffering from a lack of popular support and wanted to demonstrate its competency by creating and promoting an exemplary policy success.

Hwang approached Park Ki-young, a former biology professor, then appointed as the Information, Science and Technology Advisor for the President, and put her as one of the co-authors in his 2004 Science paper. Ties with Park yielded a favorable environment for Hwang in the government, as a non-official group consisting of high-ranking government officials was created to support Hwang's research that includes not only Hwang and Park, but also Kim Byung-joon, Chief National Policy Secretary, and Jin Dae-je, Information and Communications Minister. The group was dubbed as "Hwang-kum-pak-chui", a loose acronym made from member's family names, which means "golden bat" in Korean.

After Hwang's paper was published in Science in 2005, support for Hwang came in full swing. In June 2005, the Ministry of Science and Technology selected Hwang as the first recipient of the title Supreme Scientist, an honor worth US$15 million. Hwang, having already claimed the title of POSCO Chair Professor worth US$1.5 million, secured more than US$27 million worth of support in that year.

President Roh had been acquainted with Hwang since 2003, and made a number of comments intended to protect him from potential bioethical issues. On June 18, 2004, Roh awarded Hwang a medal and said, "it is not possible nor desirable to prohibit research, just because there are concerns that it may lead to a direction that is deemed unethical." In another instance at the opening of World Stem Cell Hub on October 19, 2005, Roh remarked, "politicians have a responsibility to manage bioethical controversies, not to get in the way of this outstanding research and progress."

On December 5, 2005, after PD Su-cheop stirred a national controversy, Cheong Wa Dae reaffirmed its unflinching support for Hwang and his research team. Roh said, "We'll continue to support Professor Hwang. We hope he will return to his research lab soon for the sake of people with physical difficulties and the public", according to presidential spokesman Kim Man-soo.

While implying the controversies over MBC-TV's forceful methods used to gather information from Hwang's former junior staff members, Roh said, "The disputes will be resolved gradually and naturally through following scientific research and study. We hope the ongoing disputes over Hwang's achievement will be settled without further trouble."

It was alleged that advisor Park Ki-young deliberately avoided to report Roh about details of Hwang's allegation for misconduct, while emphasizing a breach of journalist ethics by MBC. Park, after weeks of silence for her role in the controversy, announced her intent to resign from the advisor post on January 10, 2006.

On January 11, 2006, the national post office stopped selling post stamps commemorating Hwang's research. The title of Supreme Scientist awarded to Hwang was revoked on March 21, 2006, after Hwang was dismissed from Seoul National University the day before.

=== Supporting lawmakers group ===
On December 6, 2005, a group of 43 lawmakers from the ruling and opposition parties inaugurated a body to support Hwang Woo-suk. Members of the group, dubbed the "lawmakers' group supporting Professor Hwang Woo-suk", pledged to help Hwang continue his experiments in pursuit of a scientific breakthrough.

"There are many lawmakers who, regardless of party affiliation, want to support Hwang. We will join forces to help Hwang devote himself to his studies", Rep. Kwon Sun-taik of the ruling Uri Party said in a news conference at the National Assembly, who was also the leader of the group.

He said the group would seek to establish bioethics guidelines and come up with supporting measures for biotechnology researchers in the country. Among those who had joined the group were Reps. Kim Hyuk-kyu, Kim Young-choon and Kim Sung-gon of the ruling party, Kim Hyong-o of the main opposition Grand National Party (GNP) and Kim Hak-won, chairman of the United Liberal Democrats.

Some female lawmakers participated in a civic group for voluntary egg donations for therapeutic research, which opened in November 2005 following the egg procurement scandal.

Reps. Song Young-sun and Chin Soo-hee of the GNP said they would provide their eggs to Hwang's research team. Meanwhile, the ruling and opposition parties called on the Korean Broadcasting Commission to thoroughly investigate the staffers of MBC's PD Note, which broadcast a documentary program critical of Hwang with coercive tactics in interviews, and reprimand them.

After most of Hwang's claims were confirmed to be false on January 10, 2006, some lawmakers revealed that Hwang had made several campaign donations to them and other lawmakers.

=== Resumption of PD Note ===
The MBC investigative journalism show PD Note (Korean: PD수첩) returned on air on January 3, 2006, and summarized the course of Hwang's scandal to date. The show had been cancelled under pressure after it broadcast its show on November 22 that accused Hwang of oddities in his research. The last show in 2005, aired on November 29, covered other topics. It remained off the air for five weeks. The second show in 2006, on January 10, dealt further with the Hwang affair, focusing on several instances of Hwang's media spinning tactics. It also covered the unwillingness on the part of a significant part of the public in South Korea to believe that someone who had almost achieved a status of a national hero committed such a shame.

=== Rallies supporting Hwang ===
The same day many South Korean citizens rallied outside Hwang's laboratory; as more than 1,000 women pledged to donate their eggs for the scientist's research. [ ... ] Hwang has been in seclusion since apologizing in November 2005, for ethical lapses in human egg procurement for his research. The symbolic event was as a gesture from Hwang's supporters that says they intend to donate their eggs with 1,000 of their members after they took egg-donation pledges online via their website. "Dr. Hwang will not be able to return to the lab, at least, until at the end of this week because he is extremely exhausted, mentally and physically", a key team member, Ahn Cu Rie, wrote in an e-mail to Reuters. [ ... ] At Hwang's lab at Seoul National University, women left bouquets of the national flower, a hibiscus called the Rose of Sharon, for the scientist along with notes of encouragement.

The stem cell research center that Hwang led before resigning said it hoped he would return, even though his lapses could hurt its efforts to work with other research institutions.

"So far more than 700 South Korean women have pledged to donate their eggs and the number is steadily rising", said Lee Sun-min, an official at a private foundation launched last week to promote egg donations. [ ... ] Thousands of patients have applied to participate in the research, hoping the technology could help treat damaged spinal cords or diseases such as Parkinson's. On Tuesday, an official at the lab said it was hoped that Hwang would return.

"We're waiting for Hwang to assume the leadership after some rest", Seong Myong-hoon told a news conference. But Seong said the controversy could hurt the lab. That conclusion was reached after one of Hwang's close research partners, Ahn Cu-rie, returned Tuesday after a 10-day trip to meet with scientists in the United States and Japan, Seong said.

"The reaction of foreign scientists was that they understand what Dr. Hwang disclosed, but they cannot accept that without criticism", Seong said. "We can never be optimistic about cooperation with foreign institutions."

Seong added: "Researchers of our country were newly awakened to the fact that we have to take every precaution to ensure we don't fall behind international ethics (guidelines) while researching."

"The only hope for us is Dr. Hwang. Don't trample on our one shred of hope", a woman whose son suffers from a severe kidney ailment told South Korean broadcaster YTN at the university. The woman also pledged to sell her eggs to Hwang.

=== Online ova donations ===
A website backed by Hwang's supporters began taking egg-donation pledges online since late November 2005 after Hwang resigned all his official posts at World Stem Cell Hub. The details of South Korean women were then passed on to private foundation that claimed to be working with Hwang's research team. An official for the foundation claimed they had received over 700 egg donation pledges.

Banners like "Please come back, Doctor Hwang. I'm already dying to see you, Professor Hwang", were put up on the home page of the fan site. The site also carried a photo of Hwang and his cloned dog, Snuppy, trimmed with images of the rose of Sharon, South Korea's national flower, in an apparent appeal for patriotism. The national anthem played as background music.

Those who applied to donate ova included people with incurable illnesses and their family members, who hoped that Hwang's research would eventually lead to cures, and young, healthy women.

Egg donation offers were also made through organisations with no ties to Hwang, with one organisation dedicated to scientific research claiming the amount of volunteers they had received had sharply increased Hwang's resignation.

== Documentary ==
In June 2023, Netflix released a documentary film, King of Clones, which covered Hwang Woo-suk and the Hwang affair.

== Citizenship ==
Hwang Woo-suk held South Korean citizenship until April 9, 2026 after he was given United Arab Emirates citizenship. He immediately applied to regain South Korean citizenship which he automatically lost.

== See also ==
- List of geneticists and biochemists
- Scientific misconduct, including a list of science scandals.
- Schön scandal
- Haruko Obokata
- List of scientific misconduct incidents
- Whistle Blower (film)
