= Oregon Health and Science University Center for Women's Health =

Center for clinical services

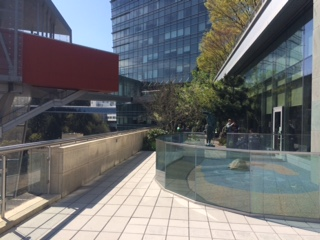
OHSU Center for Women's Health terrace

The OHSU Center for Women's Health is a center for clinical services and health education and information for women at Oregon Health and Science University (OHSU) in Portland, Oregon. It is a designated "National Center of Excellence" for Women's Health, a status granted by the U.S. Department of Health and Human Services. As part of an academic medical center, the Center for Women's Health aims to improve awareness of women's health in the education and research arms of OHSU, and incorporates that education and research into the clinical setting.

== History ==
The OHSU Center for Women's Health was established in 1997, following the efforts of a group of prominent local supporters, including Mary Wilcox and Arlene Schnitzer, to create a health services provider "capable of treating a woman's varied health needs in one location." In 2003, the center was designated a "National Center of Excellence" in Women's Health by the federal Health and Human Services Office on Women's Health.

In 2006, the OHSU Center for Women's Health moved into its current main clinical location, in the Kohler Pavilion building on the OHSU campus. The clinical space was designed to remind patients of a "spa experience", with the idea that it would promote healing in patients at the center. In 2013, the directorship of the OHSU Center for Women's Health was divided from the position of the chair of the department of obstetrics and gynecology, who had historically filled both leadership roles. The dean of the OHSU School of Medicine appointed Michelle Berlin, M.D., MPH, and Renee Edwards, M.D., MBA, as interim co-directors of the center.

== Clinical services ==
The OHSU Center for Women's Health serves patients in three main clinical locations on the main campus of OHSU. The Center sees patients for the following clinical services:

- Acupuncture
- Bleeding disorders
- Cardiovascular conditions
- Fertility
- General Gynecology and Obstetrics
- Gynecologic Oncology
- Mental Health and Wellness
- Naturopathy
- Nutrition
- Perinatology
- Physical Therapy
- Pregnancy and Childbirth
- Primary Care
- Urogynecology

== Education and outreach offerings ==
As part of the university healthcare system at OHSU, the Center for Women's Health participates in the training of medical students, residents, and fellows under the supervision of faculty physicians. The OHSU Center for Women's Health provides education and outreach programs outside of the clinical setting, including classes about childbirth and parenting, nutrition, and wellness.

== Research ==
In 2006, a group of donors interested in women's health research created a giving circle called the Center for Women's Health Circle of Giving, which provides a $125,000 grant to start-up research in women's health. Since its inception, the Center for Women's Health Circle of Giving has awarded over $1.4 million to fund women's health researchers, including Shoukhrat Mitalipov.
