= 2008 US beef protest in South Korea =

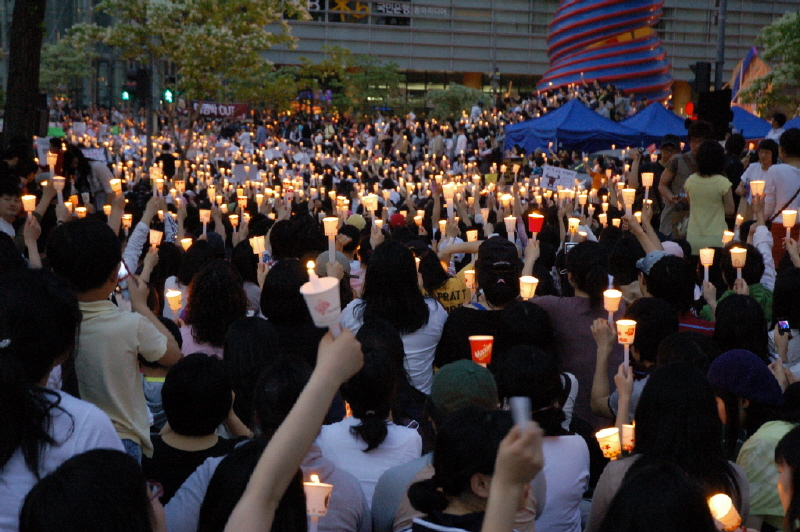
Protesters lit up their candles in downtown Seoul, 3 May 2008.

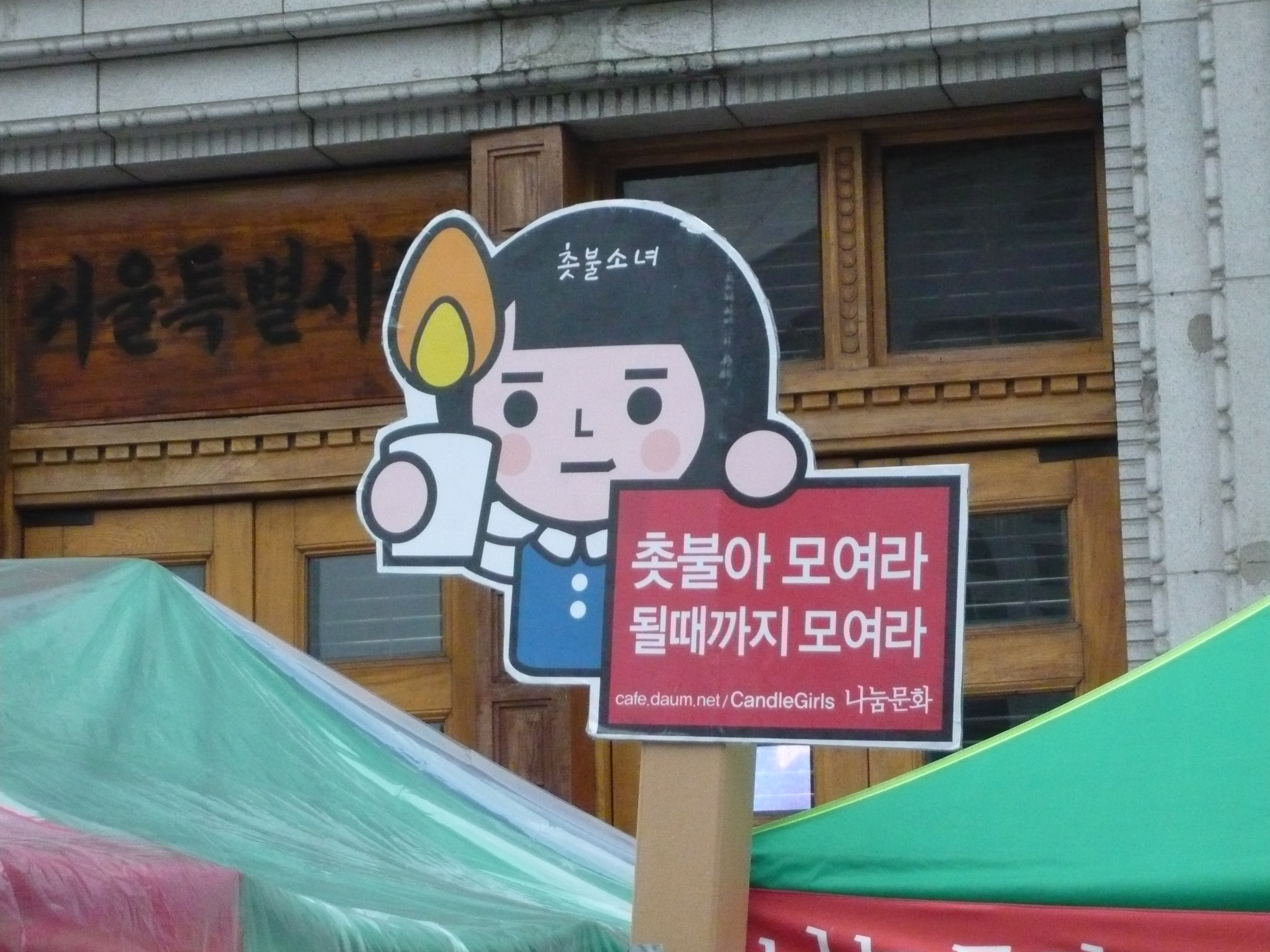
A close up picture of Candle-light girl, an iconic character created by protest organizers. The slogan reads, "All candles together, till our goals are achieved". Photo taken in front of Seoul City Hall on 6 June 2008.

The 2008 US beef protest in South Korea was a series of protest demonstrations made between 24 May 2008 and mid August 2008. against president Lee Myung-bak in Seoul, Korea. The protest involved several hundred thousand and at its height up to one million people. The protest began after the South Korean government reversed a ban on US beef imports. The ban had been in place since December 2003, when mad cow disease was detected in US beef cattle.

The protests occurred on a background of talks concerning the US-Korea free trade agreement. Critics accused the move as an attempt by the Korean government to please the US government.

Local media also criticized the government's attempt. An example of this is the Munhwa Broadcasting Corporation (MBC) PD Note program "Is American Beef Really Safe from Mad Cow Disease? (긴급취재, 미국산 쇠고기, 과연 광우병에서 안전한가)" televised on 27 April 2008.

Lee Myung-bak's popularity plummeted after the decision and protests.

== Background ==
South Korea was once the third-largest importer of US beef. This changed when in 2003 mad-cow disease, specifically the prion responsible for bovine spongiform encephalopathy (BSE), was detected in US beef. Imports were then halted. Christine Ahn of Foreign Policy in Focus writes that the main concern was that Koreans eat parts of the cow that are more likely to contain prions, such as the brain, eyes, and intestines.

In 2008, the then new Lee Myung-bak government agreed, after extensive negotiations, to restart imports.

That decision set off a firestorm of controversy, leading hundreds of thousands of citizens to come out in the spring and early summer of 2008 in protest over the resumed imports and against the corrupt chaebol government. Media reports, public networks, and PD Note uncovered the new president's policies to be putting South Koreans' health at risk of contracting mad cow disease. The deal sparked public outrage for exposing the country to a higher risk of mad cow disease.

Natively referred to as the "Million Citizen Protests," the events comprised nation's largest anti-government movement in two decades, drawing hundreds of thousands of citizens daily and 1,700 civic groups over a span of three months. The conflict escalated to over 770,000 protesters in contention with 470,000 police.

== Origin of the protest ==
=== 2003 ===
On 23 December 2003, a first case of BSE in the US was found in Washington state. The Holstein cow had been imported from Canada in 2001. On 9 December the 6.5-year-old cow was slaughtered. The cow was a "downer" (a cow that is unable to walk). For that reason, the US Department of Agriculture (USDA) was automatically notified; and the cow was examined before and after its death by a government vet. The veterinarian determined that the cow was suffering from complications of calving. Samples of tissue were taken for further testing for BSE. Parts of the cow with a high risk of transmitting the BSE prion were removed but may have been sent for "inedible rendering" into food for non-ruminant animals. The carcass itself was allowed to continue on for further processing into human food at other facilities. On 23 December 2003 when tests proved positive for BSE, a recall was made. The contaminated meat had not entered the commercial market. Offspring of the cow were destroyed. South Korea, Japan, Singapore, Malaysia and Taiwan banned imports of US beef.

The head of the US FDA at the time was Ann M. Veneman, a former lobbyist for the food industry.

Japan allowed "imports of beef and beef products aged 20 months or younger" as a "'scientifically sound and internationally recognized standard,'" stated US Agriculture secretary Mike Johanns. In contrast, the first phase of Korea's agreement allows bone-in beef 30 months or younger while the second phase allows "specified products from animals over 30 months at a later date.

Contrary to FDA regulations and those specified by the Free Trade Agreement, only 5 out of 57 local companies requested for packages to be checked. There was a 3% inspection from US and 1% inspection agreement from Australia/New Zealand. The sample packages were inspected solely for labeling discrepancies, instead of the presence of disease. Although there were many confirmed cases of BSE in brain scans and medical tests performed on the public, the true death toll of these policies has yet to be calculated.

=== 2006 ===
By 2006, sixty-five nations had full or partial restrictions on the importation of US beef. Export sales of US beef fell from $3.8 billion in 2003 to $1.4 billion in 2005. An attempt to reopen the South Korean market to US beef imports in 2006 (restricted to boneless meat from cattle less than 30 months old) failed when the South Korean government discovered bone chips in a shipment of 3.2 tons of meat. Sporadic attempts made in the following year also failed for similar reasons.

=== 2008 – Lee's reversal of the beef import ban ===
On 17 January 2008 representatives of the president of South Korea met with Alexander Vershbow, the U.S. ambassador to South Korea to discuss beef imports. Further talks were held between 11 and 17 April 2008. On 18 April U.S. and South Korean negotiators reached an agreement on the sanitary rules that Korea would require of U.S. beef imports. The agreement allowed imports of all cuts of U.S. beef (both boneless and bone-in) and certain beef products, including those from cattle over 30 months old. Processors had to remove material known to risk BSE prion transmission. President Lee visited President George W. Bush at Camp David on 20 April 2008. The U.S. reported,

President Bush welcomed the decision of the Korean government to resume the import of U.S. beef, based on international standards and science. The two presidents pledged to make every effort to urge their respective legislatures to approve the KORUS FTA (Korean US Free trade agreement) within this year.

Demonstrators accused Lee of reversing the ban on imports of U.S. beef in haste, giving the U.S. unwarranted concessions, so that Korea would receive a favorable reception, particularly with respect to ratifying the proposed free trade agreement. The demonstrators said Lee had abandoned his duty of care to the people of South Korea for political gain by ignoring their concern about BSE prion transmission and by lowering tariffs on imported beef. Korea agreed to remove a 40% tariff on beef muscle meat imported from the U.S. for a period of 15 years. Korea could however, impose temporary tariffs if there was a surge of U.S. beef imports above specified levels.

The government's main reason for the concessions involved Lee's deal to sell Hyundai cars, as the former vice president of Hyundai Corporation. "Mr. Lee hoped his decision to end the five-year-old ban on American beef would help win United States Congressional support for a free trade agreement between the countries. Congressional leaders have warned that they will never ratify the pact unless South Korea fully opens its market to American beef."

== MBC PD Note program ==
On 27 April 2008, MBC televised a program called "Is American Beef Really Safe from Mad Cow Disease?" The program precipitated mass demonstrations. After a complaint was received from the South Korean agriculture ministry, the Seoul central prosecutors' office formed a team of five to investigate the program's content.

=== Downer cows ===
Downer cows are animals presented for slaughter that are sick or unable to walk. One of many causes for a downer is BSE. MBC was criticised for broadcasting footage of downer cows with translated subtitles that suggested they suffered from BSE, whereas they were filmed because of animal cruelty concerns, not BSE.

=== Aretha Vinson ===
Aretha Vinson was a 21-year-old student at Virginia State University. She died on 9 April 2008 of Wernicke's encephalopathy. The MBC broadcast showed footage of Vinson's mother speaking about her daughter's illness. Translated subtitles suggested Vinson had vCJD, but that was only one initial diagnostic possibility.

=== Risk of US beef to South Korea ===
Concerns that some commentators raised about the program included, MBC's statements about a genetic vulnerability of Koreans to CJD; the US exporting cattle over 30 months old to Korea rather than selling it to the domestic market; and, the risk of contracting CJD by consuming beef products such as powdered soup base in instant noodles, cosmetics, and gelatin medication.

== Reaction to PD Note ==
Demonstrations involving tens of thousands of people began shortly after the first broadcast, and increased when MBC aired another segment two weeks later.

=== Korean Communications Commission ===
MBC became the subject of legal action. On 12 August 2008, the Korea Communications Commission called for MBC to apologise to the public over misrepresentations made in the PD Note program. MBC apologised in a two-minute broadcast, conceding that six translation errors had been made and that downer cattle had been mistakenly identified as suffering from BSE.

=== MBC versus Government ===
The government of South Korea directed its prosecutors office to investigate alleged actions of the MBC including mis-representations made by the PD Note program; aggravation of civil unrest; and, defamation of the minister for agriculture. In June 2009, four producers and one writer were indicted on the charges. In January 2010, the MBC staff were exonerated by judges of the Seoul central district court. The supreme court upheld the findings.

== "Candlelight" demonstrations ==
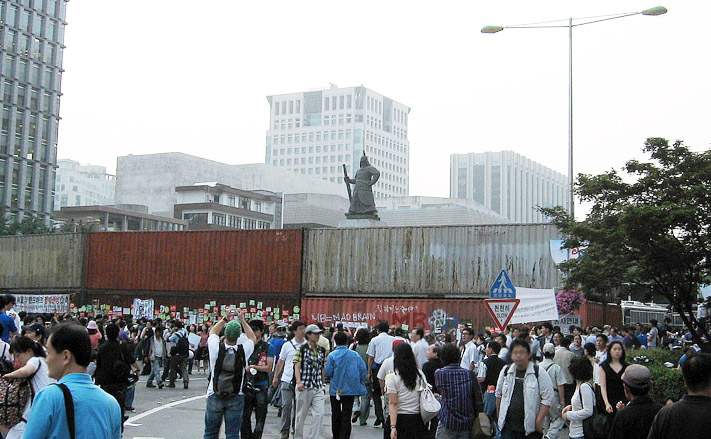
Stacked shipping containers in downtown Seoul blocking Sejong avenue, which leads to the South Korean Presidential residence the Blue House. Photo taken on 12 June 2008.

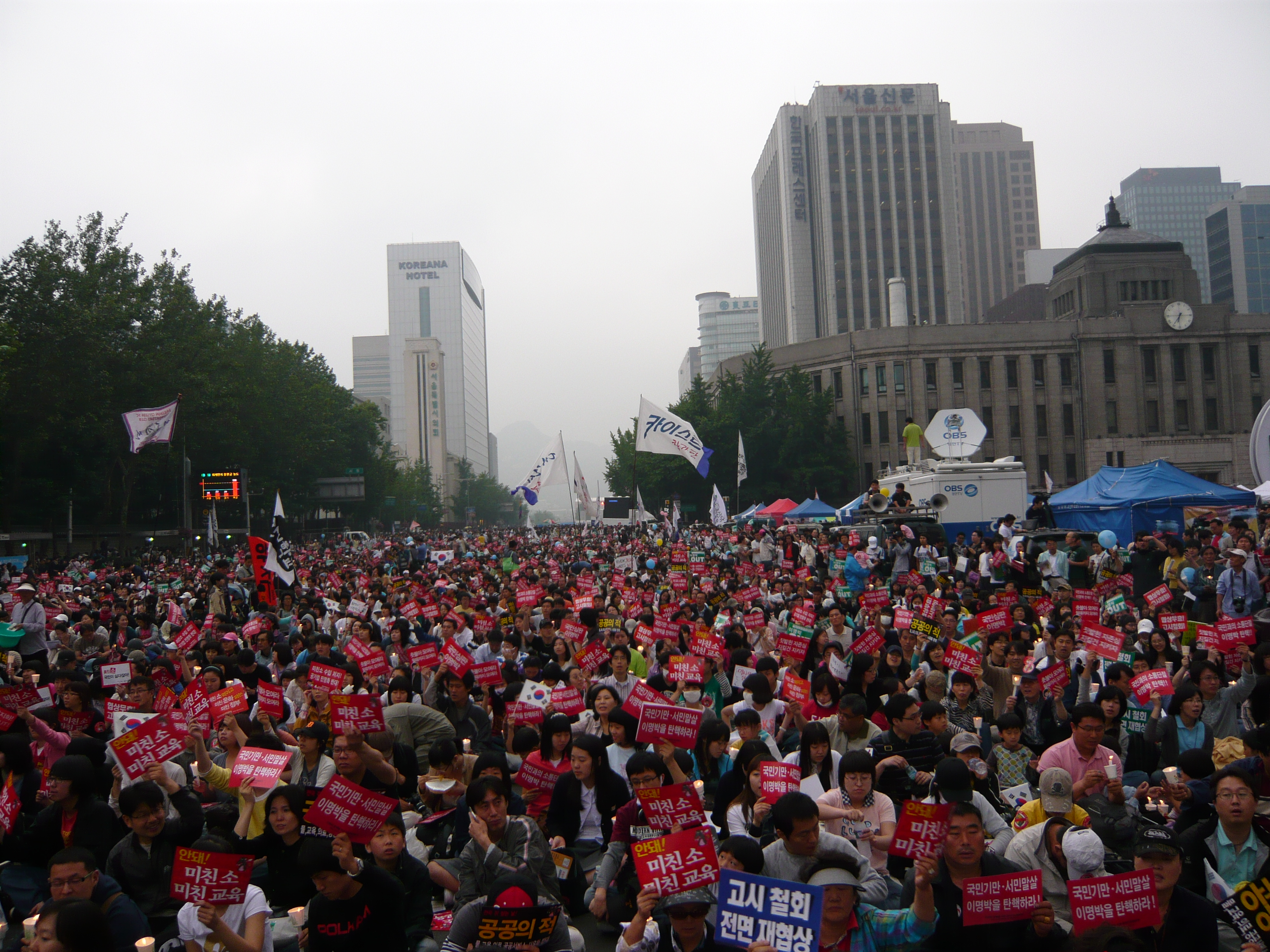
Mass protesters occupied Seoul Plaza in front of Seoul City Hall. Photo taken on 6 June 2008.

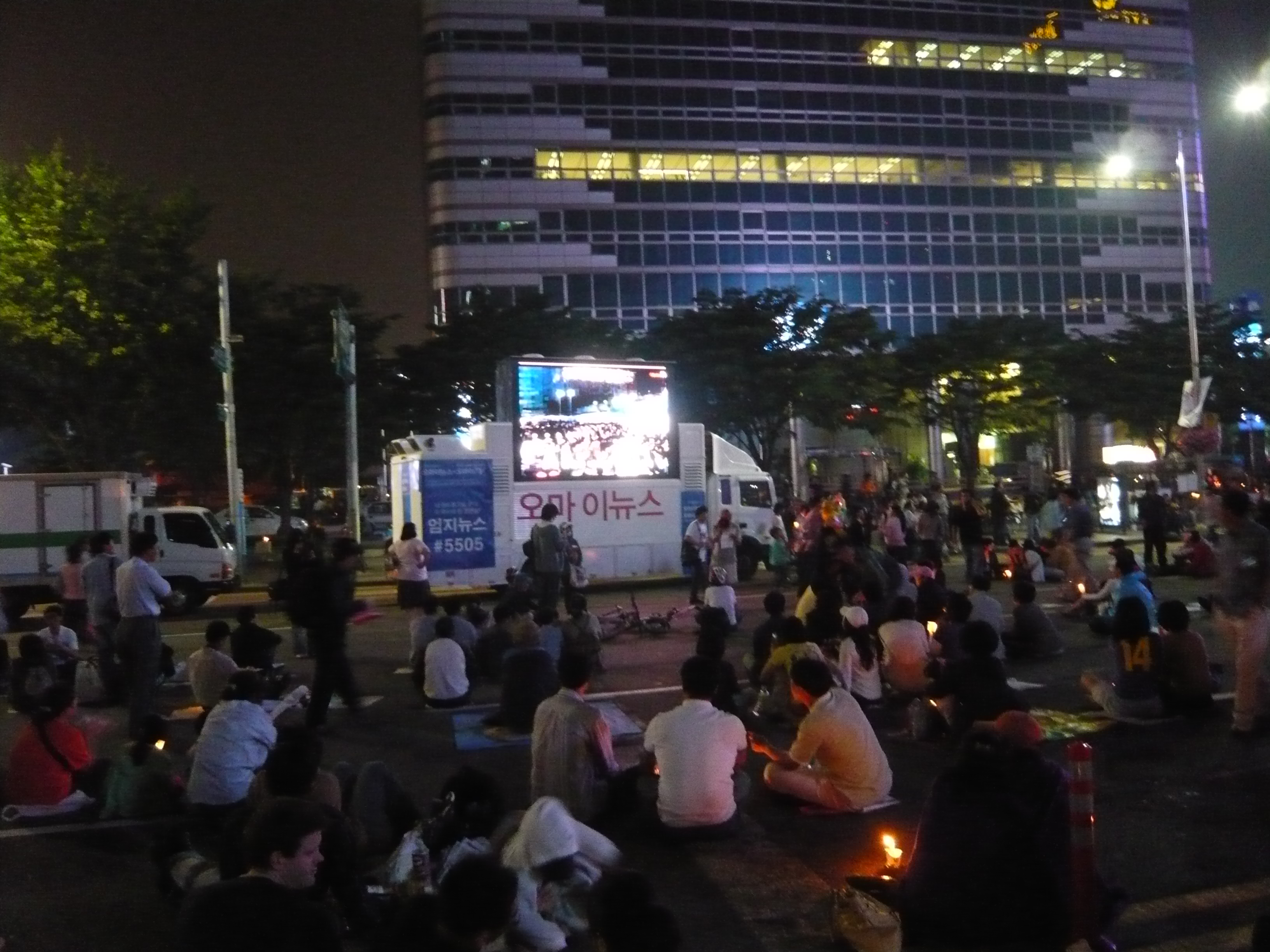
Internet news media Ohmynews broadcasting live protest in the street.

Some commentators argue that there is a long-held and perpetual "culture of protest" in South Korea involving groups ranging from anarchists to social reformers. Anti US beef protests began on 24 May 2008. After the MBC PD Note broadcast, the US beef protests in Seoul increased. A three-day demonstration held in relay took place from 5 June 2008 to 7 June 2008. Attendance peaked on the evening of 10 June 2008, (80,000 protestors in attendance) before declining.

=== Influence of social media ===
Internet and text messaging also assisted in publicising the movement. With ready access to social media, among the first to protest were teenage schoolgirls. A teenage schoolgirl holding a lit candle became the symbol of the anti-US beef protests. Comments made by some protestors had little basis in science.

=== The demonstrators ===
After the initial demonstration, the area in front of Seoul's city hall, as well as the adjoining streets, were occupied by demonstrators. Early in the protest, a festival like atmosphere prevailed as protesters of all walks of life, built a makeshift tent city on the lawn at Seoul Plaza. However, some massive, disruptive and sometimes aggressive demonstrations and street marches were held each night, particularly at weekends. Thus, the protest had two faces: more peaceful during the day and more violent at night. About 200 protestors required hospital treatment.

Resulting in over 200 injuries and over 1,000 arrests, the issue had far-reaching effects, including a large outcry from groups philosophically opposed to civil disobedience. "Police estimated that 60,000 people, including 7,000 monks clad in gray Buddhist garb, gathered in front of City Hall in Seoul."

=== Police action ===
On 1 June 2008, police took action to control demonstrators. Buses and shipping containers were used to halt the progress of street marches. A barrier of shipping containers were erected across Sejong-Ro to stop marchers from reaching Cheongwadae (office and residence of the president). The protestors named the barrier, "Myung-bak's Fortress" and decorated it with leaflets and large Korean flags. They photographed themselves standing on the barrier. It was dismantled several days later without conflict. Water cannons were used to suppress protestors. Some demonstrators were detained for questioning. The Amnesty International reported that:

The protests were for the most part peaceful and given its size and duration, both the protesters and the police showed notable organization and restraint. However, there were sporadic incidents of violence, as riot police and protesters clashed. The two main flashpoints of violence occurred on 31 May/1 June, when the police first used water cannons, tear gas, and fire extinguishers, and 28/29 June, the weekend following the government's announcement that US beef imports would resume. The decision to use water cannons and fire extinguishers contributed to the mass resignation of all 14 members of the Korean National Police Agency's human rights committee.

=== Other forms of protest ===
Several workers' unions went on strike to show their opposition to the beef import. One of them is the Korean Metal Workers' Union, which represents workers at 240 companies, including the country's four major automakers. On 2 July, they went on a two-hour strike to demand a new beef deal and better working conditions.

On 6 July, the Catholic Priests' Association for Justice, an influential religious group known for its struggle against the dictatorships, lead an outdoor Mass to lend its moral support to the protesters.

== Effects of the protests ==
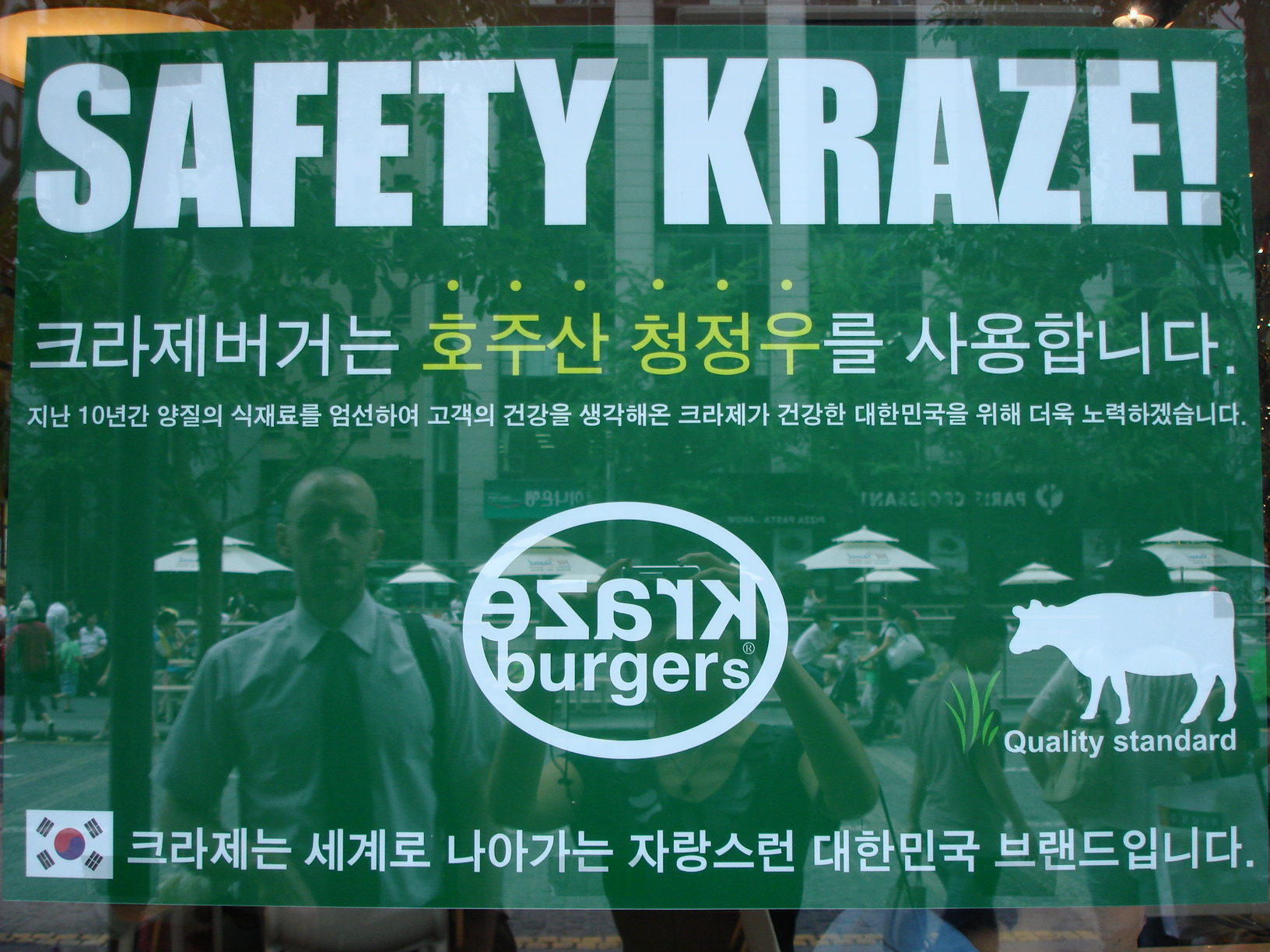
A fast food restaurant in Seoul reassuring customers that they are using "clean beef from Australia".

=== Korean government ===
The approval rating of Lee fell below 20%. Prime Minister Han Seung-soo and other cabinet members submitted their resignations to President Lee. On 22 May and then again on 18 June 2008, Lee apologised for ignoring public health concerns. Lee said,

I should have paid attention to what people want. Sitting on a hill near Cheongwadae on the night of 10 June, watching the candlelight vigil, I blamed myself for not serving the people better.

Lee also delayed the announcement of any further relaxation of beef importation rules, for example, importation of meat from cattle over 30 months of age. On 2 July 2008, Han Seung-soo, Prime Minister of South Korea bought 260,000 South Korean won (roughly US$230–$260) worth of U.S. steak to eat with his family at his official residence to alleviate public worries about U.S. beef. The same amount of Korean beef would have cost approximately 800,000 South Korean won (roughly $700–$800, three times more expensive than imported U.S. beef).

=== United States ===
On 22 June 2008, an American trade envoy headed by Susan C. Schwab, agreed with the Korean prime minister and agriculture minister to limit the export of meat to that from carcasses of cattle less than 30 months old with government certification of their age and to allow Korea to inspect a sample of U.S. slaughterhouses. The agreement also included the banning of importation to Korea of meat from cattle organs considered high risk for transmission of the BSE prion such as brains, eyes, skulls and spinal cord. Schwab said,

We look forward to safe, affordable, high-quality American beef – the same beef enjoyed by hundreds of millions of U.S. consumers and people in countries around the world – soon arriving on Korean tables.

Tom Casey, deputy spokesman at the U.S. State Department rejected the notion that the U.S. had bullied S. Korea into removing the 2003 ban on U.S. beef imports and said,

[The U.S. and S. Korea] have a long history of military and security cooperation. I don't think this or any other individual issues are going to change the fundamental relations (between the two countries).

From December 2009 to December 2010 the US meat export federation (USMEF) used a 3 phase project called, "To trust". It was an image campaign, designed to increase the trust of Koreans in US beef. It depicted three women who were mothers and homemakers. One was a rancher, one a scientist and one a food safety inspector.

=== Hi! Seoul festival ===
In 2009, a small number of demonstrators commemorated the anniversary of the 2008 protests. They forcibly occupied the Hi! Seoul Festival stage in front of the city hall in central Seoul. The police removed the protestors.

=== Commentators ===
Kim Dae-joong (not to be confused with former Korean President and Nobel Peace Prize winner Kim Dae-jung), a columnist at the Korea Times, wrote in his editorial piece: "It amounts to double-crossing to be really fond of America in all substantive matters, while bad-mouthing America in public protests."

== US beef imports in South Korea ==
On 1 July 2008, U.S. beef imports resumed. In 2009, the US exported 141 million lbs of beef to South Korea worth $215 million. In 2017, the United States became the top beef exporter to South Korea, with a record of sending 177,445 tonnes.

== See also ==
- Bovine spongiform encephalopathy
- South Korea – United States Free Trade Agreement
- Lee Myung-bak
- United States beef imports in South Korea
- US beef imports in Japan
- US beef imports in Taiwan
