= Nuria Martí Gutiérrez =

Spanish senior research associate

Nuria Marti Gutierrez
- Born: 1979 (age 46–47); Madrid, Spain
- Education: University of Valencia University of Alicante
- Known for: Somatic cell nuclear transfer
- Scientific career
- Thesis: Terapias de reemplazo mitocondrial en la línea germinal y sus aplicaciones clínicas (2015)
- Doctoral advisor: Shoukhrat Mitalipov
- Other academic advisors: Maria Rosa Peris Sanchis

Nuria Martí Gutiérrez is currently a senior research associate at the Center for Embryonic Cell and Gene Therapy at Oregon Health & Science University (OHSU). She received her bachelors in biological sciences from the University of Valencia with a specialty in reproductive science. She received her master's degree in clinical biology and reproduction from the University of Alicante and her PhD from the University of Valencia for her work studying mitochondrial replacement using somatic cell nuclear transfer (SCNT) under the direction of Shoukhrat Mitalipov. While working with Mitalipov, she helped to pioneer the technique to reprogram embryonic stem cells (ESCs) from somatic cells using SCNT.

== Career ==
Martí Gutiérrez graduated with a bachelor's in biological sciences from the University of Valencia in 2003. In 2004 received her master's degree in clinical biology and reproduction from the University of Alicante which included an internship at the Hospital La Fe de Valencia, the university hospital at University of Valencia. She began her doctoral work at the Principe Felipe Research Center, the flagship center of Spanish biomedical research, under the supervision of Miodrag Stojković. In 2011 Martí Gutiérrez noted there were rumors of an expediente de regulación de empleo (ERE), or a massive permanent layoff. Shortly thereafter, she transferred to OHSU to work directly in Shoukhrat Mitalipov's lab. She finished her PhD in 2015 and continues to work with Shoukhrat Mitalipov studying incompatibility between nuclear and mitochondrial genomes contributes to speciation and germline gene correction
