= Human cloning =

Creation of a genetically identical copy of a human

Diagram of the ways to reprogram cells along with the development of humans

Human cloning is the creation of a genetically identical copy of a human. The term is generally used to refer to artificial human cloning, which is the reproduction of human cells and tissue. It does not refer to the natural conception and delivery of identical twins. The possibilities of human cloning have raised controversies. These ethical concerns have prompted several nations to pass laws regarding human cloning.

Two commonly discussed types of human cloning are therapeutic cloning and reproductive cloning.

Therapeutic cloning would involve cloning cells from a human for use in medicine and transplants. It is an active area of research, and is in medical practice over the world. Two common methods of therapeutic cloning that are being researched are somatic-cell nuclear transfer and (more recently) pluripotent stem cell induction.

Reproductive cloning would involve making an entire cloned human, instead of just specific cells or tissues.

== History ==
Although the possibility of cloning humans had been the subject of speculation for much of the 20th century, scientists and policymakers began to take the prospect seriously in 1969. J. B. S. Haldane was the first to introduce the idea of human cloning, for which he used the terms "clone" and "cloning", which had been used in agriculture since the early 20th century. In his speech on "Biological Possibilities for the Human Species of the Next Ten Thousand Years" at the Ciba Foundation Symposium on Man and his Future in 1963, he said:

It is extremely hopeful that some human cell lines can be grown on a medium of precisely known chemical composition. Perhaps the first step will be the production of a clone from a single fertilized egg, as in Brave New World... Assuming that cloning is possible, I expect that most clones would be made from people aged at least fifty, except for athletes and dancers, who would be cloned younger. They would be made from people who were held to have excelled in a socially acceptable accomplishment...

Nobel Prize-winning geneticist Joshua Lederberg advocated cloning and genetic engineering in an article in The American Naturalist in 1966 and again, the following year, in The Washington Post. He sparked a debate with conservative bioethicist Leon Kass, who wrote at the time that "the programmed reproduction of man will, in fact, dehumanize him." Another Nobel Laureate, James D. Watson, publicized the potential and the perils of cloning in his Atlantic Monthly essay, "Moving Toward the Clonal Man", in 1971.

With the cloning of a sheep known as Dolly in 1996 by somatic cell nuclear transfer (SCNT), the idea of human cloning became a hot debate topic. Many nations outlawed it, while a few scientists promised to make a clone within the next few years. The first hybrid human clone was created in November 1998, by Advanced Cell Technology. It was created using SCNT; a nucleus was taken from a man's leg cell and inserted into a cow's egg from which the nucleus had been removed, and the hybrid cell was cultured and developed into an embryo. The embryo was destroyed after 12 days.

In 2004 and 2005, Hwang Woo-suk, a professor at Seoul National University, published two separate articles in the journal Science claiming to have successfully harvested pluripotent, embryonic stem cells from a cloned human blastocyst using SCNT techniques. Hwang claimed to have created eleven different patient-specific stem cell lines. This would have been the first major breakthrough in human cloning. However, in 2006 Science retracted both of his articles on account of clear evidence that much of his data from the experiments was fabricated.

In January 2008, Dr. Andrew French and Samuel Wood of the biotechnology company Stemagen announced that they successfully created the first five mature human embryos using SCNT. In this case, each embryo was created by taking a nucleus from a skin cell (donated by Wood and a colleague) and inserting it into a human egg from which the nucleus had been removed. The embryos were developed only to the blastocyst stage, at which point they were studied in processes that destroyed them. Members of the lab said that their next set of experiments would aim to generate embryonic stem cell lines; these are the "holy grail" that would be useful for therapeutic or reproductive cloning.

In 2011, scientists at the New York Stem Cell Foundation announced that they had succeeded in generating embryonic stem cell lines, but their process involved leaving the oocyte's nucleus in place, resulting in triploid cells, which would not be useful for cloning.

In 2013, a group of scientists led by Shoukhrat Mitalipov published the first report of embryonic stem cells created using SCNT. In this experiment, the researchers developed a protocol for using SCNT in human cells, which differs slightly from the one used in other organisms. Four embryonic stem cell lines from human fetal somatic cells were derived from those blastocysts. All four lines were derived using oocytes from the same donor, ensuring that all mitochondrial DNA inherited was identical. A year later, a team led by Robert Lanza at Advanced Cell Technology reported that they had replicated Mitalipov's results and further demonstrated the effectiveness by cloning adult cells using SCNT.

In 2018, the first successful cloning of primates using SCNT was reported with the birth of two live female clones, crab-eating macaques named Zhong Zhong and Hua Hua, and there have been several similar reports since. However, all these cases involved cloning of fetal cells - as yet, no primate has been cloned from adult cells.

== Methods ==
=== Somatic cell nuclear transfer (SCNT) ===
Diagram of SCNT process

In somatic cell nuclear transfer ("SCNT"), the nucleus of a somatic cell is taken from a donor and transplanted into a host egg cell, which had its own genetic material removed previously, making it an enucleated egg. After the donor somatic cell genetic material is transferred into the host oocyte with a micropipette, the somatic cell genetic material is fused with the egg using an electric current. Once the two cells have fused, the new cell can be permitted to grow in a surrogate or artificially. This is the process that was used to successfully clone Dolly the sheep (see § History). The technique, now refined, has indicated that it was possible to replicate cells and reestablish pluripotency, or "the potential of an embryonic cell to grow into any one of the numerous different types of mature body cells that make up a complete organism".

=== Induced pluripotent stem cells (iPSCs) ===
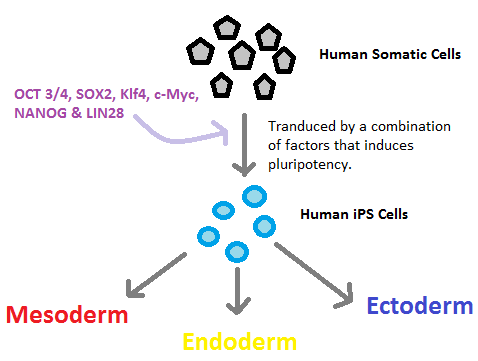
Overview of iPS cells

Creating induced pluripotent stem cells ("iPSCs") is a long and inefficient process. Pluripotency refers to a stem cell that has the potential to differentiate into any of the three germ layers: endoderm (interior stomach lining, gastrointestinal tract, the lungs), mesoderm (muscle, bone, blood, urogenital), or ectoderm (epidermal tissues and nervous tissue). A specific set of genes, often called "reprogramming factors", are introduced into a specific adult cell type. These factors send signals in the mature cell that cause the cell to become a pluripotent stem cell. This process is highly studied and new techniques are being discovered frequently on how to improve this induction process.

Depending on the method used, reprogramming of adult cells into iPSCs for implantation could have severe limitations in humans. If a virus is used as a reprogramming factor for the cell, cancer-causing genes called oncogenes may be activated. These cells would appear as rapidly dividing cancer cells that do not respond to the body's natural cell signaling process. However, in 2008 scientists discovered a technique that could remove the presence of these oncogenes after pluripotency induction, thereby increasing the potential use of iPSC in humans.

=== Comparing SCNT to reprogramming ===
Both the processes of SCNT and iPSCs have benefits and deficiencies. Historically, reprogramming methods were better studied than SCNT derived embryonic stem cells (ESCs). However, more recent studies have put more emphasis on developing new procedures for SCNT-ESCs. The major advantage of SCNT over iPSCs at this time is the speed with which cells can be produced. iPSCs derivation takes several months while SCNT would take a much shorter time, which could be important for medical applications. New studies are working to improve the process of iPSC in terms of both speed and efficiency with the discovery of new reprogramming factors in oocytes. Another advantage SCNT could have over iPSCs is its potential to treat mitochondrial disease, as it uses a donor oocyte. No other advantages are known at this time in using stem cells derived from one method over stem cells derived from the other.

== Uses and actual potential ==
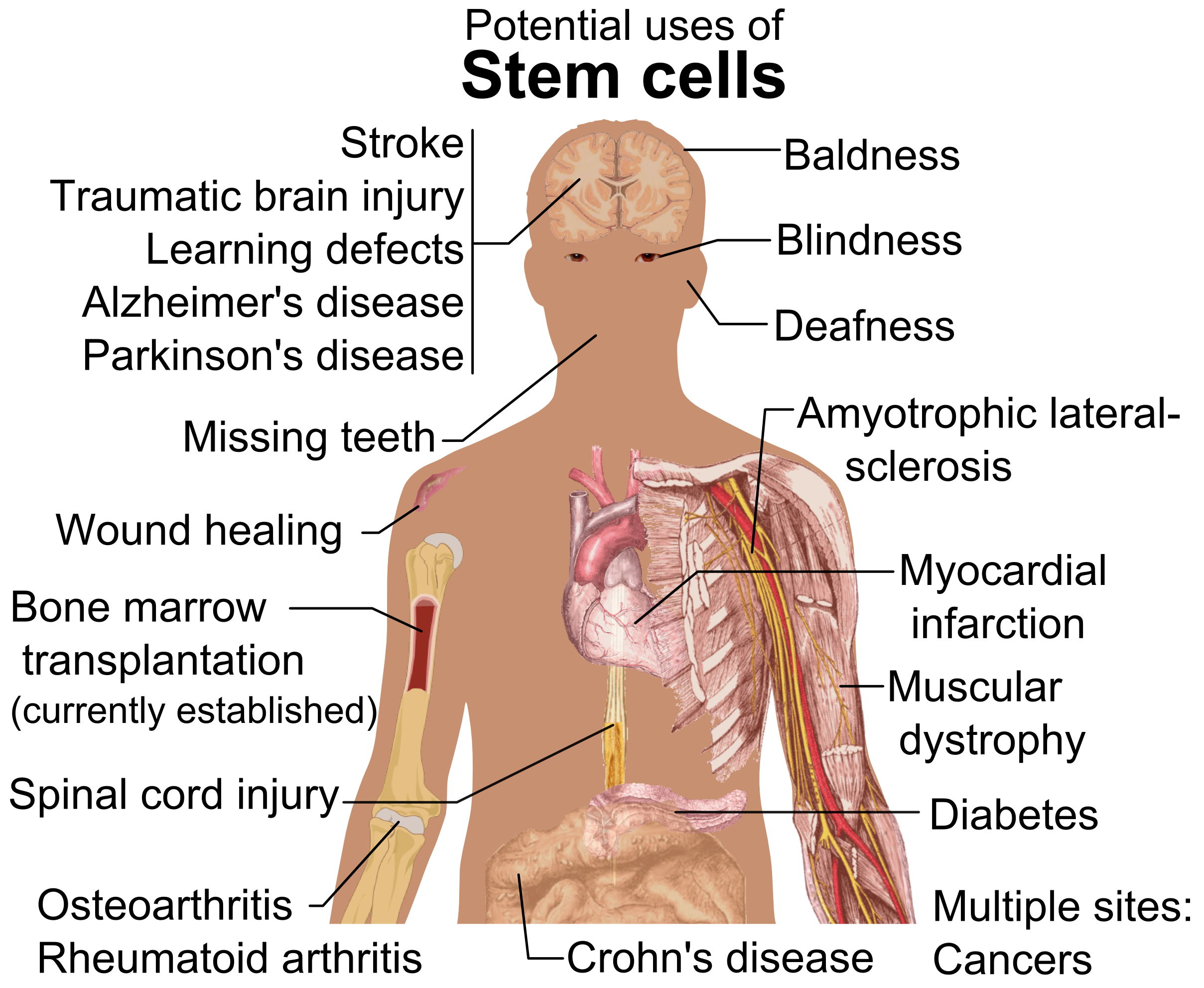
Stem cell treatments

Work on cloning techniques has advanced understanding of developmental biology in humans. Observing human pluripotent stem cells grown in culture provides great insight into human embryo development, which otherwise cannot be seen. Scientists are now able to better define steps of early human development. Studying signal transduction along with genetic manipulation within the early human embryo has the potential to provide answers to many developmental diseases and defects. Many human-specific signaling pathways have been discovered by studying human embryonic stem cells. Studying developmental pathways in humans has given developmental biologists more evidence toward the hypothesis that developmental pathways are conserved throughout species.

iPSCs and cells created by SCNT are useful for research into the causes of disease, and as model systems used in drug discovery.

Cells produced with SCNT, or iPSCs could eventually be used in stem cell therapy, or to create organs to be used in transplantation, known as regenerative medicine. Stem cell therapy is the use of stem cells to treat or prevent a disease or condition. Bone marrow transplantation is a widely used form of stem cell therapy. No other forms of stem cell therapy are in clinical use at this time. Research is underway to potentially use stem cell therapy to treat heart disease, diabetes, and spinal cord injuries. Regenerative medicine is not in clinical practice, but is heavily researched for its potential uses. This type of medicine would allow for autologous transplantation, thus removing the risk of organ transplant rejection by the recipient. For instance, a person with liver disease could potentially have a new liver grown using their same genetic material and transplanted to remove the damaged liver. In current research, human pluripotent stem cells have been promised as a reliable source for generating human neurons, showing the potential for regenerative medicine in brain and neural injuries.

== Ethical implications ==
In bioethics, the ethics of cloning refers to a variety of ethical positions regarding the practice and possibilities of cloning, especially human cloning. While many of these views are religious in origin, for instance relating to Christian views of procreation and personhood, the questions raised by cloning engage secular perspectives as well, particularly the concept of identity.

Advocates support development of therapeutic cloning in order to generate tissues and whole organs to treat patients who otherwise cannot obtain transplants, to avoid the need for immunosuppressive drugs, and to stave off the effects of aging. Advocates for reproductive cloning believe that parents who cannot otherwise procreate should have access to the technology.

Opposition to therapeutic cloning mainly centers around the status of embryonic stem cells, which has connections with the abortion debate. The moral argument put forward is based on the notion that embryos deserve protection from the moment of their conception because it is at this precise moment that a new human entity emerges, already a unique individual. Since it is deemed unacceptable to sacrifice human lives for any purpose, the argument asserts that the destruction of embryos for research purposes is no longer justifiable.

Some opponents of reproductive cloning have concerns that technology is not yet developed enough to be safe – for example, the position of the American Association for the Advancement of Science as of 2014, while others emphasize that reproductive cloning could be prone to abuse (leading to the generation of humans whose organs and tissues would be harvested), and have concerns about how cloned individuals could integrate with families and with society at large.

Members of religious groups are divided. Some Christian theologians perceive the technology as usurping God's role in creation and, to the extent embryos are used, destroying a human life; others see no inconsistency between Christian tenets and cloning's positive and potentially life-saving benefits.

== Legal status of human therapeutic cloning maps ==
Human cloning laws Illegal Some forms legal Legal No data

Human therapeutic cloning laws by U.S. state Legal Illegal No data, not specified or unclear

== Legal status of human cloning by jurisdiction ==
Jurisdiction	Reproductive cloning	Therapeutic cloning	Notes
Argentina	Illegal	Illegal	Human cloning is banned by the Presidential Decree 200/97 of 7 March 1997.
Australia	Illegal	Legal	Australia has prohibited human cloning, though as of December 2006, a bill legalizing therapeutic cloning and the creation of human embryos for stem cell research passed the House of Representatives. Within certain regulatory limits, and subject to the effect of state legislation, therapeutic cloning is now legal in some parts of Australia.
Austria	Illegal	Illegal	
Belgium	Illegal	Legal	
Brazil	Illegal	Illegal	
Canada	Illegal	Illegal	Canadian law prohibits the following: cloning humans, cloning stem cells, growing human embryos for research purposes, and buying or selling of embryos, sperm, eggs or other human reproductive material. It also bans making changes to human DNA that would pass from one generation to the next, including use of animal DNA in humans. Surrogate mothers are legally allowed, as is donation of sperm or eggs for reproductive purposes. Human embryos and stem cells are also permitted to be donated for research. There have been consistent calls in Canada to ban human reproductive cloning since the 1993 Report of the Royal Commission on New Reproductive Technologies. Polls have indicated that an overwhelming majority of Canadians oppose human reproductive cloning, though the regulation of human cloning continues to be a significant national and international policy issue. The notion of "human dignity" is commonly used to justify cloning laws. The basis for this justification is that reproductive human cloning necessarily infringes notions of human dignity.
Chile	Illegal	Illegal	
China	Illegal	Legal	The government "does not approve, does not allow, does not support, does not accept" any reproductive human cloning experiments, but does not oppose therapeutic cloning. In the Eleventh Amendment to the Criminal Law, which came into effect on March 1, 2021, an additional provision was added to Article 336, which stipulates that "implanting gene-edited or cloned human embryos into human or animal bodies, or implanting gene-edited, cloned Implantation of cloned animal embryos into human bodies, if the circumstances are serious, shall be sentenced to fixed-term imprisonment of not more than three years or criminal detention and a fine; if the circumstances are especially serious, the sentence shall be fixed-term imprisonment of not less than three years but not more than seven years and a fine."
Colombia	Illegal	Legal	Human cloning is prohibited in Article 133 of the Colombian Penal Code.
Costa Rica	Illegal	Illegal	
Council of Europe	Illegal	Not specified	The European Convention on Human Rights and Biomedicine, a.k.a. the Oviedo Convention, prohibits human cloning in one of its additional protocols; this protocol has been ratified by the following states: Albania, Andorra, Bosnia and Herzegovina, Bulgaria, Croatia, Cyprus, Czech Republic, Denmark, Estonia, Finland, France, Georgia, Greece, Hungary, Iceland, Latvia, Liechtenstein, Lithuania, Moldova, Montenegro, North Macedonia, Norway, Portugal, Romania, San Marino, Serbia, Slovakia, Slovenia, Spain, Switzerland, Turkey
Czech Republic	Illegal	Illegal	
Denmark	Illegal	Illegal	
Ecuador	Illegal	Illegal	
Egypt	Illegal	Illegal	
Estonia	Illegal	Illegal	
European Union	Illegal	Not specified	The Charter of Fundamental Rights of the European Union explicitly prohibits reproductive human cloning. The charter is legally binding for the institutions of the European Union under the Treaty of Lisbon and for some member countries of the Union implementing EU regulations. (Note: In some countries (e.g., the Italian Republic) international treaties never override the national Constitution or the other constitutional laws. Poland opted-out and is not part of the said Charter.)
Finland	Illegal	Legal	Section 4 of the Act on Assisted Fertility Treatments (1237/2006) prohibits the use of cloned embryos in fertility treatment. Finland's delegation to the Council of Europe has described therapeutic cloning as permitted under an interpretation of the Medical Research Act (488/1999) that excludes cells produced by nuclear transfer from its definition of an embryo. The delegation noted that this interpretation had not been tested in practice.
France	Illegal	Illegal	The Code Civil in its article 16-4 prohibits all forms of cloning. All forms of cloning including therapeutic cloning has been specifically prohibited by 6 August 2004 bioethics law
Georgia	Illegal	Illegal	
Germany	Illegal	Illegal	Section 6 of the Embryo Protection Act prohibits artificial creation of a human embryo with the same genetic information as another embryo, fetus, living person or deceased person. Creating such an embryo or transferring it to a woman is punishable by up to five years in prison or a fine; attempts are also punishable.
Greece	Illegal	Illegal	
Hungary	Illegal	Not specified	The Constitution of Hungary (Section Freedom and Responsibility, Article 3 (3)) prohibits human cloning.
Iceland	Illegal	Illegal	
India	Illegal	Legal	India does not have specific laws regarding cloning but has guidelines prohibiting whole human cloning or reproductive cloning. India allows therapeutic cloning and the use of embryonic stem cells for research purposes. There are legal implications in this case. India has already succeeded in mammalian cloning.
Iran	No data	Not specified	
Ireland	Illegal	Illegal	
Israel	Illegal	Legal	Human reproductive cloning is prohibited under the Prohibition of Genetic Intervention Law (1999). A 2024 amendment extended the temporary law until 31 May 2028.
Italy	Illegal	Illegal	
Japan	Illegal	Legal	
Latvia	Illegal	Illegal	
Lithuania	Illegal	Illegal	
Morocco	Illegal	Illegal	In Morocco, all research on human embryos or fetuses is forbidden, as is the conception of human embryos or fetuses for research or experimental purposes, in accordance with article 7 of Dahir no. 1–19–50.
Netherlands	Illegal	Illegal	
New Zealand	Illegal	Legal	Schedule 1 of the Human Assisted Reproductive Technology Act 2004 prohibits creating cloned embryos for reproductive purposes and implanting cloned embryos into humans. For the prohibition on creating cloned embryos, embryos produced by splitting an embryo formed through fertilisation are excluded from the definition.
Norway	Illegal	Illegal	
Pakistan	Illegal	Legal within the limits of Islam	Pakistan's Council of Islamic Ideology has declared human cloning as an un-Islamic act. According to Pakistan's Council of Islamic Ideology, research and thinking are not banned in Islam; new innovations are allowed, but within the limits of the religion.
Panama	Illegal	Illegal	
Peru	Illegal	Illegal	
Poland	Illegal	Illegal	Human cloning forbidden by article 87 of Act of 25 June 2015.
Portugal	Illegal	Illegal	
Republic of China	Illegal	Illegal	
Russia	Illegal	Illegal	The Federal Assembly of Russia introduced the Federal Law N 54-FZ "On the temporary ban on human cloning" on 19 April 2002. On 20 May 2002, President Vladimir Putin signed this moratorium on the implementation of human cloning. On 29 March 2010, The Federal Assembly introduced second revision of this law without time limit.
Serbia	Illegal	No data	Human cloning is explicitly prohibited in Article 24, "Right to Life" of the 2006 Constitution of Serbia.
Singapore	Illegal	Legal	Section 5 of the Human Cloning and Other Prohibited Practices Act 2004 prohibits the placing of a human embryo clone in the body of a human or animal.
Slovakia	Illegal	Illegal	
Slovenia	Illegal	Illegal	
South Africa	Illegal	Illegal	In terms of section 39A of the Human Tissue Act 65 of 1983, genetic manipulation of gametes or zygotes outside the human body is absolutely prohibited. A zygote is the cell resulting from the fusion of two gametes; thus the fertilised ovum. Section 39A thus prohibits human cloning.
South Korea	Illegal	Legal	
Spain	Illegal	Illegal	
Sweden	Illegal	Legal	
Switzerland	Illegal	Illegal	Article 119 of the Federal Constitution prohibits human cloning. Cloning is also prohibited under the Reproductive Medicine Act and the Stem Cell Research Act.
Thailand	No data	Legal	
Trinidad and Tobago	Illegal	Illegal	
Tunisia	Illegal	Illegal	
Turkey	No data	Legal	
Ukraine	No data	Not specified	
United Kingdom	Illegal	Legal	On 14 January 2001, the British government passed The Human Fertilisation and Embryology (Research Purposes) Regulations 2001 to amend the Human Fertilisation and Embryology Act 1990 by extending allowable reasons for embryo research to permit research around stem cells and cell nuclear replacement, thus allowing therapeutic cloning. However, on 15 November 2001, a pro-life group won a High Court legal challenge, which struck down the regulation and effectively left all forms of cloning unregulated in the UK. Their hope was that Parliament would fill this gap by passing prohibitive legislation. Parliament was quick to pass the Human Reproductive Cloning Act 2001 which explicitly prohibited reproductive cloning. The remaining gap with regard to therapeutic cloning was closed when the appeals courts reversed the previous decision of the High Court. The first license was granted on 11 August 2004, to researchers at the University of Newcastle to allow them to investigate treatments for diabetes, Parkinson's disease and Alzheimer's disease. The Human Fertilisation and Embryology Act 2008, a major review of fertility legislation, repealed the 2001 Cloning Act by making amendments of similar effect to the 1990 Act. The 2008 Act also allows experiments on hybrid human-animal embryos.
United Nations	Illegal (soft law, i.e. not binding on member states)	Not specified	On 13 December 2001, the United Nations General Assembly began elaborating an international convention against the reproductive cloning of humans. A broad coalition of states, including Spain, Italy, the Philippines, the United States, Costa Rica, and the Holy See sought to extend the debate to ban all forms of human cloning, noting that, in their view, therapeutic human cloning violates human dignity. Costa Rica proposed the adoption of an international convention to ban all forms of human cloning. Unable to reach a consensus on a binding convention, in March 2005 a non-binding United Nations Declaration on Human Cloning, calling for the ban of all forms of human cloning contrary to human dignity, was adopted.
United States	Not legislated at the federal level, depends on state legislation	Not legislated at the federal level, depends on state legislation	As of 2024, there are no federal laws in the United States which ban cloning completely. In 1998, 2001, 2004, 2005, 2007 and 2009, the United States Congress voted whether to ban all human cloning, both reproductive and therapeutic (Stem Cell Research Enhancement Act). Divisions in the Senate, or an eventual veto from the sitting President (George W. Bush in 2005 and 2007), over therapeutic cloning prevented either competing proposal (a ban on both forms or on reproductive cloning only) from being passed into law. On 10 March 2010, a bill (HR 4808) was introduced with a section banning federal funding for human cloning. Such a law, if passed, would not have prevented research from occurring in private institutions (such as universities) that have both private and federal funding. However, the 2010 law was not passed. Ten states, California, Connecticut, Illinois, Iowa, Maryland, Massachusetts, Missouri, Montana, New Jersey and Rhode Island, have "clone and kill" laws that prevent cloned embryo implantation for childbirth, but allow embryos to be destroyed. The Patients First Act of 2017 (HR 2918, 115th Congress) aims to promote stem cell research, using cells that are "ethically obtained", that could contribute to a better understanding of diseases and therapies, as well as promote the "derivation of pluripotent stem cell lines without the creation of human embryos".
Uruguay	No data	Not specified	
Vietnam	Illegal	Illegal	

=== Legal status of human cloning by U.S. state ===
State	Legal status		Notes
State	Reproductive cloning	Therapeutic cloning	Notes
Alabama	Not legislated	Not legislated	
Alaska	Not legislated	Not legislated	
Arizona	Illegal	Illegal	Prohibition on the use of public funds for human cloning.
Arkansas	Illegal	Illegal	Criminal and civil penalties.
California	Illegal	Legal	Civil penalties.
Colorado	Not legislated	Not legislated	
Connecticut	Illegal	Legal	
Delaware	Not legislated	Not legislated	
Florida	Unclear	Not legislated	
Georgia	Unclear	Not legislated	
Hawaii	Not legislated	Not legislated	
Idaho	Not prohibited	Not prohibited	
Illinois	Illegal	Legal	
Indiana	Illegal (indirectly)	Illegal (indirectly)	Prohibition on the use of public funds for human cloning.
Iowa	Illegal	Unclear	Criminal and civil penalties.
Kansas	Not legislated	Not legislated	
Kentucky (Note: Uses the term commonwealth rather than state in its full official name)	Not legislated	Not legislated	
Louisiana	Law prohibiting expired	Law allowing expired	Criminal and civil penalties. Prohibition on the use of public funds for human cloning.
Maine	Illegal (indirectly)	Illegal (indirectly)	
Maryland	Illegal	Legal	Prohibition on the use of public funds for human cloning.
Massachusetts	Illegal	Legal	
Michigan	Illegal	Illegal	Criminal and civil penalties.
Minnesota	Not legislated	Illegal (indirectly)	
Mississippi	Not legislated	Not legislated	
Missouri	Illegal	Legal	Prohibition on the use of public funds for human cloning.
Montana	Illegal	Legal	
Nebraska	Not legislated	Not legislated	Prohibition on the use of public funds for human cloning.
Nevada	Not legislated	Not legislated	
New Hampshire	Not legislated	Not legislated	
New Jersey	Illegal	Legal	
New Mexico	Not legislated	Not legislated	
New York	Not legislated	Not legislated	
North Carolina	Not legislated	Not legislated	
North Dakota	Illegal	Illegal	Criminal and civil penalties.
Ohio	Not legislated	Not legislated	
Oklahoma	Illegal	Illegal	
Oregon	Not legislated	Not legislated	
Pennsylvania	Not legislated	Not legislated	
Rhode Island	Illegal	Legal	Criminal and civil penalties.
South Carolina	Not legislated	Not legislated	
South Dakota	Illegal	Illegal	
Tennessee	Not legislated	Not legislated	
Texas	Not legislated	Not legislated	
Utah	Not legislated	Not legislated	
Vermont	Not legislated	Not legislated	
Virginia	Illegal	Unclear	Civil penalties.
Washington	Not legislated	Not legislated	
West Virginia	Not legislated	Not legislated	
Wisconsin	Not legislated	Not legislated	
Wyoming	Not legislated	Not legislated	

== In popular culture ==
Science fiction has used cloning, most commonly and specifically human cloning, due to the fact that it brings up controversial questions of identity. Humorous fiction, such as Multiplicity (1996) and the Maxwell Smart feature The Nude Bomb (1980), have featured human cloning. A recurring sub-theme of cloning fiction is the use of clones as a supply of organs for transplantation. Robin Cook's 1997 novel Chromosome 6, Michael Bay's The Island, and Nancy Farmer's 2002 novel House of the Scorpion are examples of this; Chromosome 6 also features genetic manipulation and xenotransplantation. The Star Wars saga makes use of millions of human clones to form the Grand Army of the Republic that participated in the Clone Wars. The series Orphan Black follows human clones' stories and experiences as they deal with issues and react to being the property of a chain of scientific institutions. In the 2019 horror film Us, the entirety of the United States' population is secretly cloned. Years later, these clones (known as The Tethered) reveal themselves to the world by successfully pulling off a mass genocide of their counterparts.

In the 2005 novel Never Let Me Go, Kazuo Ishiguro crafts a subtle exploration into the ethical complications of cloning humans for medical advancement and longevity.

== See also ==
- Homunculus
- Hwang affair
