= Shoukhrat Mitalipov =

Kazakh-American microbiologist (born 1961)

- Born: 1961 (age 64–65); Tastykara village, Almaty Region, Kazakh SSR, USSR
- Citizenship: American
- Education: Timiryazev Agricultural Academy Research Centre of Medical Genetics
- Scientific career
- Workplaces: Utah State University, Oregon Health and Science University
- Doctoral students: Nuria Martí Gutiérrez

Shoukhrat Mitalipov (ShoKHRAHT Mee-tuhl-EE-pov, Russian: Шухрат Музапарович Миталипов; born 1961) is an American biologist who heads the Center for Embryonic Cell and Gene Therapy at the Oregon Health & Science University in Portland. He is a well known pioneer of many nuclear transplantation studies and was named in 2013 by journal Nature as "the cloning chief". Mitalipov is also a godfather of a gene therapy, known as mitochondrial replacement therapy, that prevents inheritance of mitochondrial diseases. He discovered a new way of creating human stem cells from skin cells.

== Early life ==
Mitalipov was born in 1961 in Almaty, Kazakhstan, then part of the Soviet Union. He is of Uyghur ancestry. He served two years in Soviet military, beginning in 1979, as an army radio technician.

== Education ==
After the military, Mitalipov studied genetics at the Timiryazev Agricultural Academy in Moscow and also played blues guitar in a cover band to pay the bills. After his graduation from the academy, he worked for a short time as the chief livestock specialist in a kolkhoz in the Yaroslavl region. He received his master's degree in 1989. He earned his PhD in developmental and stem cell biology from the Research Centre of Medical Genetics in Moscow. After the fall of the Soviet Union in 1991 funding for stem cell research was scarce, so Mitalipov applied for and won a fellowship at Utah State University in 1995. He started working at the Oregon National Primate Research Center in 1998, where he could work with monkeys, which share 98% of their DNA with humans; at Utah State Mitalipov had worked with cow DNA.

== Breakthroughs ==
A therapy for mitochondrial diseases that Mitalipov discovered, the "spindle transfer" technique, involves removing the nucleus from a human egg and placing it into another. If the egg is fertilized, in genetic terms it would have three parents. Mitalipov has successfully bred "three-parent" rhesus macaques. The possibility of using the procedure on human eggs has raised safety and ethics questions.

In May 2013, Mitalipov and his team published a study in Cell that describes a new process for creating human stem cells from skin cells. The stem cell discovery made several journals' "Top 10" scientific breakthrough lists in 2013, including Nature, Science, Time, Discover, National Geographic and The Week.

In August 2017, Mitalipov's collaborative work with the Institute for Basic Science, Salk Institute for Biological Studies, Seoul National University, BGI-Shenzhen and BGI-Qingdao, was published in Nature. performed the first known successful attempt at genetically correcting mutant human embryos, using the CRISPR/Cas9 gene modifying tool.

Mitalipov and his team experimented upon a larger number of human embryos carrying a genetic defect causing heart disease. They demonstrated the possibility of safely and efficiently correcting the defective gene that cause inherited heart disease.

== Honors and awards ==
- 1995 – Fellowship award, Exchange Visitor Program "Cooperation in Applied Sciences and Technologies (CAST)". Development of culture system to maintain pluripotency of bovine embryonic stem cells. Utah State University.
- 2010 – Recipient of the 2010 Discovery Award, The Medical Research Foundation of Oregon
- 2010 – Recipient of 2010 Women's Health Research Award, the Center for Women's Health, Circle of Giving
- 2013 – Recognized by journal Nature as top 10 people who mattered in 2013
- 2017 – Recipient of "Thousand Talents Plan" Award in China in the category of the Recruitment Program for Foreign Experts

== Salient publications ==
- Tachibana, Masahito; Sparman, Michelle; Sritanaudomchai, Hathaitip; Ma, Hong; Clepper, Lisa; Woodward, Joy; Li, Ying; Ramsey, Cathy; Kolotushkina, Olena; Mitalipov, Shoukhrat (2009). "Mitochondrial gene replacement in primate offspring and embryonic stem cells". Nature. 461 (7262). Nature Portfolio: 367–372. Bibcode:2009Natur.461..367T. doi:10.1038/nature08368. ISSN 0028-0836. PMC 2774772. PMID 19710649. S2CID 1203203. NIHMSID 137913.

— Widely cited including by:

- Mishra, Prashant; Chan, David (2014). "Mitochondrial dynamics and inheritance during cell division, development and disease". Nature Reviews Molecular Cell Biology. 15 (10). Nature Portfolio: 634–646. doi:10.1038/nrm3877. ISSN 1471-0072. PMC 4250044. PMID 25237825. S2CID 18105759. NIHMSID 644044.

== See also ==
- Uyghur Americans
- Chimera (genetics)
- Human cloning
- Nuclear transfer
- Germline gene therapy
