= Hwang Woo-suk affair =

South Korean scientific misconduct scandal

The Hwang Woo-suk affair (or Hwang scandal) is a case of scientific misconduct and ethical issues surrounding a South Korean biologist, Hwang Woo-suk, who claimed to have created the first human embryonic stem cells by cloning. Hwang and his research team at the Seoul National University (SNU) claimed cloning of pigs in 2002, and then BSE (bovine spongiform encephalopathy)-resistant cow. In 2004, they announced the successful cloning of human stem cells using somatic cell nuclear transfer. The next year they cloned 11 person-specific stem cells using 185 human eggs, the publication of which the journal Science remarked as "a ground-breaking paper".

Recognitions and honours immediately followed Hwang. For the 2004 research, Hwang received the South Korea's Presidential Award in Science and Technology, with Time magazine listing him among the "People Who Mattered 2004" and the most influential people in "The 2004 Time 100". For his 2005 work, he was elevated as "the pride of Korea", "national hero" [of Korea], and a "supreme scientist", including international praise and fame.

In late 2005, Hwang's collaborator, Gerald Schatten at the University of Pittsburgh, came to know the oocytes (egg cells) used in the 2004 study, reportedly from several voluntary donors, were in fact from Hwang's two researchers. The denial from Hwang sparked the controversy and further revelations. The ethical issues made Schatten immediately distanced himself because of the apparent ethical violations. Following a tip from a whistleblower, Science found cases of data fabrication. The SNU further confirmed that both the 2004 and 2005 papers contained fabricated results. Hwang was compelled to resign from the university, and made a public confession in January 2006. Science retracted the two papers.

In 2009, the Seoul Central District Court convicted Hwang for embezzlement and bioethical violations, sentencing him to a two-year imprisonment. The incident was then recorded as the scandal that "shook the world of science," and became "one of the most widely reported and universally disappointing cases of scientific fraud in history".

== Background ==
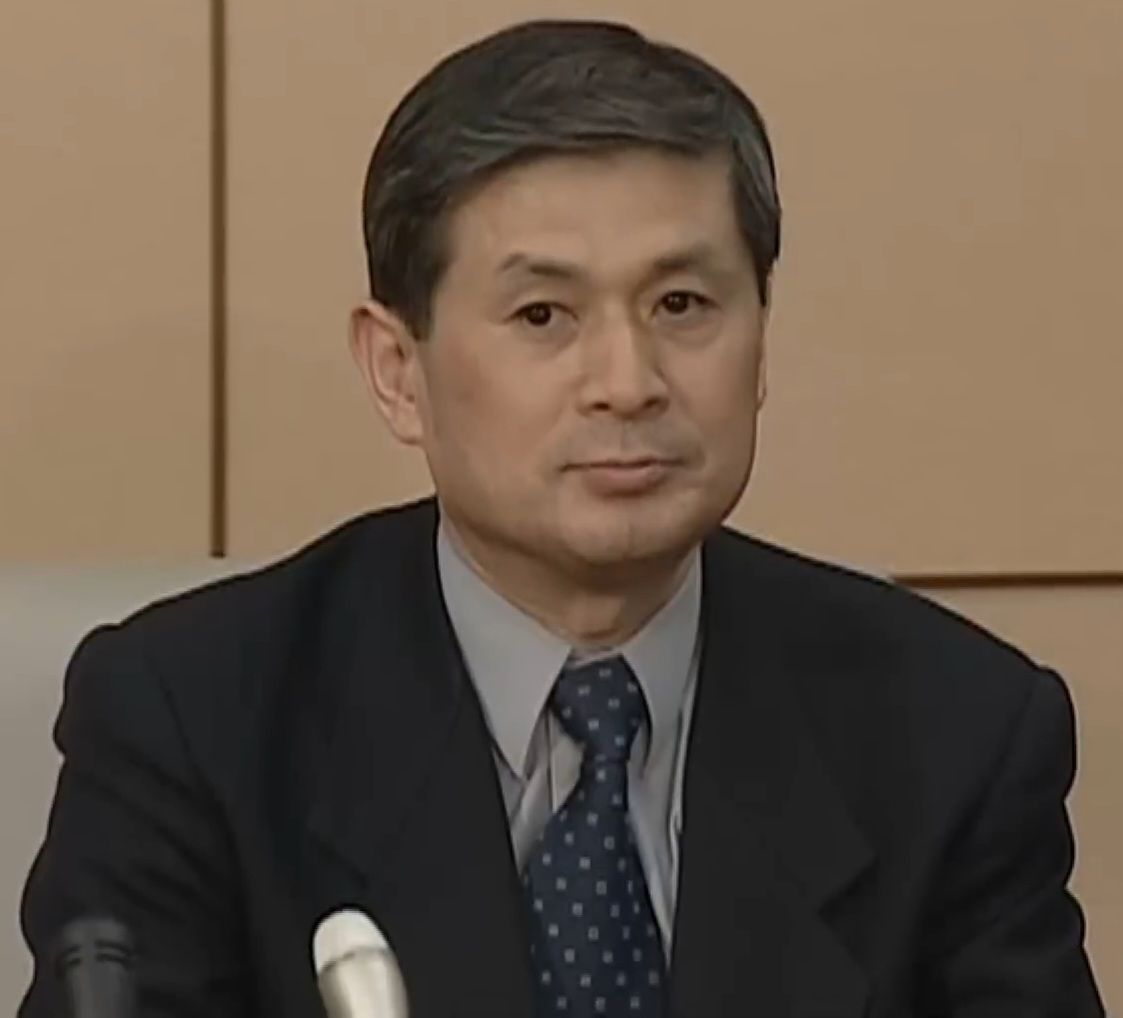
Hwang in 2004

Hwang Woo-suk was a professor of veterinary biotechnology at the Seoul National University and specialised in stem cell research. In 1993, he devised an in vitro fertilisation method with which he made the first assisted reproduction in cows. He rose to public notice in 1999 when he announced that he had successfully cloned a dairy cow, named Yeongrong-i, and a few months later, a Korean cow, Jin-i (also reported as Yin-i). The following year, he announced the preparation for cloning an endangered Siberian tiger. It was a failed attempt, but the announcements received widespread media attention in South Korea and contributed to increased public interest in his work. In 2002, he claimed creation of a genetically modified pig that could be used for human organ transplant. In 2003, he announced the successful cloning of a BSE (bovine spongiform encephalopathy)-resistant cow. However, science sceptics raised concern over the absence of research papers for any of his claims.

=== 2004 human cell cloning ===
In 2004, Hwang announced the first complete cloning of a human embryo. The research, published in the 12 March 2004 issue of Science, was reported as "Evidence of a pluripotent human embryonic stem cell line derived from a cloned blastocyst." For its potential medical value to replace diseased and damaged cells, several scientists had previously tried to clone the human embryo, but none had succeeded. Hwang's team had developed an improved method of somatic cell nuclear transfer, in which they could transfer the nuclei of somatic (non-reproductive) cells into egg cells that had their nuclei removed.

Hwang used human egg cells and cumulus cells, which are found in ovaries near the developing eggs and are known to be good source of nuclear transfer. After emptying an egg of its nucleus, they transferred the nucleus of the cumulus cell into it. The new egg cell divided normally and grew into a blastocyst, an early embryo characterised by a hollow ball of cells. They isolated the outer trophoblast cells that are destined to become the placenta, discarding the inner cell mass that would form the placenta. When the trophoblast cells were cultured, they could divide and form different tissues, indicating that they were viable stem cells. The report concluded: "This study shows the feasibility of generating human ES [embryonic stem] cells from a somatic cell isolated from a living person." It was the first instance of cloning of adult human cells and human embryonic stem cells.

Hwang publicly reported the research at the annual meeting of the American Association for the Advancement of Science (AAAS) in Seattle on 16 February 2004. He specified that they used 242 eggs from 16 unpaid volunteers, creating about 100 cells from which 30 embryos were developed. Since the embryos had adult DNA, the resulting stem cells became clones of the adult somatic cells. From the embryos, the stem cells were collected and grafted into mice in which they could grow into various body parts including muscle, bone, cartilage and connective tissues. The method ensured that immune rejection would be avoided so that it could be used for the treatment of genetic disorders. As Hwang explained: "Our approach opens the door for the use of these specially developed cells in transplantation medicine."

Recognitions and honours immediately followed, including South Korea's Presidential Award in Science and Technology, and Time magazine listing him among the "People Who Mattered 2004". Hwang and his colleague Shin Yong Moon were listed by Time at number 84 in its list of most influential people "The 2004 Time 100" in April 2004.

=== 2005 human cell cloning ===
Hwang's team reported another successful cloning of human cells in the 17 June 2005 issue of Science, in this case, embryonic stem cells derived from skin cells. Their study claimed the creation of 11 different stem cell lines that were the exact match of DNA in people having a variety of diseases. The experiment used 185 eggs from 18 donors. The report explicitly stated that: "Patients voluntarily donated oocytes and somatic cells for therapeutic cloning research and relevant applications but not for reproductive cloning ... no financial reimbursement in any form was paid."

The research was hailed as "a ground-breaking paper" in science. Hwang was elevated as "the pride of Korea", "national hero" [of Korea], and a "supreme scientist", to international praise and fame.

== Initial receptions ==
=== The 2004 report ===
When the 2004 research was announced, it was received with praise and admiration. Donald Kennedy, editor-in-chief of Science, remarked: "the generation of stem cells by somatic cell nuclear transfer methods involving the same individuals may hold promise for advances in transplantation technology that could help people affected by many devastating conditions." Time reported that as a consequence of the achievement, "a medical and ethical door that had remained mostly closed was kicked wide open." Michael S. Gazzaniga, neuroscientist and bioethicist at Dartmouth College, who had supported therapeutic cloning, described it as "a major advance in biomedical cloning". Some American scientists took the news to criticise the US government, arguing that it had weakness in stem cell research and a prohibitive attitude. As Helen Pearson reported in Nature, the cloning accomplishment turned Asians into "scientific tigers".

The critical issue was on bioethics, as the method ultimately wasted many human embryos and could be used to create full human clones, as John T. Durkin argued in Science: "the developmental events leading from fertilised ovum, to blastula, to embryo, to fetus, to fully formed adult constitute a continuum." Hwang claimed that the purpose was for medical applications only, and said in Seattle, "Reproductive cloning is strictly prohibited [in South Korea]." At the time, South Korea was developing its "Bioethics and Biosafety Act" to be enforced in 2005. The regulations proscribed human reproductive cloning and experimental fusion of human and animal embryos; even therapeutic cloning for diseases would require authorised approval. Based on this situation, Sang-yong Song of the Hanyang University, criticised Hwang for not waiting for the forthcoming regulations and social consensus in Korea. Howard H. Kendler, psychologist at the University of California, commented: "Although individuals will differ in their opinions, a democracy can decide whether the benefits of embryonic stem cell research outweigh any disadvantages. Science can assist in making this decision, but cannot dictate it."

== Circle of influences ==
Hwang attempted to establish a network of bureaucrats. To name his second cloned cow, he solicited President Kim Dae-jung, who named it after the celebrated 16th century kisaeng (courtesan) Hwang Jini. As he announced the cloning of a BSE-resistant cow in 2003, President Roh Moo-hyun visited his laboratory and was shown a dog healed from its injury using stem cell transfer, to which the president applauded, "this is not a science; this is a magic." From that point, Hwang received escalated research funding from the government that peaked in 2005 at around US$30 million. That year, the Korean Ministry of Science and Technology officially honoured him as "Supreme Scientist" for the first time in Korea; the title carried US$15 million. He was frequently portrayed in Korean media as "the pride of Korea", and appeared on numerous TV programs and newspaper covers as the face of national scientific achievement. The government set up the World Stem Cell Hub at Seoul National University Hospital on 19 October 2005, created and directed by Hwang. On the day of opening, 3000 people registered for stem cell therapy.

== Exposure ==
Suspicion and controversy arose in late 2005, when Hwang's collaborator, Gerald Schatten at the University of Pittsburgh, came to know of the real source of oocytes (egg cells) used in the 2004 study. The eggs, reportedly from several voluntary donors, were in fact from Hwang's two researchers, which Hwang later denied. The ethical issues made Schatten immediately break ties with Hwang. In December 2005, a whistleblower informed Science of reuse of data. As the journal probed in, it was revealed that there was additional data fabrication. The SNU immediately investigated the research work and found that both the 2004 and 2005 papers contained fabricated results. Hwang was compelled to resign from the university.

=== Scientific flaws ===
In the 2004 report, Hwang's team remarked that "we cannot completely exclude the possibility that the cells had a parthenogenetic origin." Reference to parthenogenesis, the ability of embryo development from egg cells without fertilisation, was relevant because it had been documented that stem cells are capable of such transformation. In 1984, an experiment demonstrated that a genetic mixture (chimera) of nuclei from the stem cells, one-cell-stage embryos of mouse could develop into full embryos. Researchers at the Advanced Cell Technology (ACT) in Worcester, Massachusetts, further showed in 2002 that primate (in this case crab-eating macaque, Macaca fascicularis) stem cells grew into the blastocyst stage. The ACT subsequently announced that they had created the human parthenogenetic cells, although the cells could not reach the blastocyst stage. In 2003, Gerald Schatten of the University of Pittsburgh and his team reported a failed attempt of stem cell cloning in rhesus monkey, as the cell divisions were erratic and produced abnormal chromosomes. Schatten declared: "This reinforces the fact that the charlatans who claim to have cloned humans have never understood enough cell or developmental biology."

=== Impact and aftermath ===
On 24 November 2005, Hwang made a public apology when the Korean health ministry ethical investigation found that his junior scientists at Seoul National University had contributed the eggs. In December 2005, Hwang informed Science that he was responsible for the mistakes and that he found "fatal errors and loopholes in reporting the scientific accomplishment." The journal immediately retracted the two papers. On 23 December, Hwang resigned from SNU. In another public speech on 11 January 2006, he blamed the MizMedi Hospital in Seoul who were supposed to supply genuine eggs from different individuals, explaining the consequences: "However, the greatest disappointment is for the potential patients who had been led to believe that new treatments would be available in the near future. Research will continue to develop methods to derive embryo stem cells from cloned human embryos because they will provide opportunities to study inherited human disease that are not available in any other way."

Hwang's story has been used a realisation on the weakness of research regulations and personal zeal for recognition, and has been called by various names including the Hwang affair, or Hwang scandal, or Hwanggate. The incident was then recorded as a "scandal that shook the world of science," and became "one of the most widely reported and universally disappointing cases of scientific fraud in history".

In 2009, the Seoul Central District Court convicted Hwang for embezzlement and bioethical violations, sentencing him to a two-year imprisonment. In response, South Korea implemented a series of research ethics reforms across universities, government agencies, and academic associations. These included stricter institutional review board (IRB) procedures and national guidelines for ethical research practices.

Although public opinion initially remained sympathetic, most Koreans quickly withdrew their support after Hwang's admission of misconduct. Online communities supporting him dissolved rapidly, reflecting a collective reassessment of scientific credibility and trust.

On 12 May 2006, Hwang was charged with embezzlement and bioethics law violations after it emerged much of his stem cell research had been faked. The Korea Times reported on 10 June 2007, that Seoul National University fired him, and the South Korean government canceled his financial support and barred him from engaging in stem cell research. Hwang was sentenced to a two years suspended prison sentence at the Seoul Central District Court on 26 October 2009, but cleared of fraud.

In 2020, the Korean government announced its revocation of Hwang's Presidential Award in Science and Technology. However, due to procedural complexity, the Supreme Court held the move. On 15 July 2026, President Lee Jae Myung formally decreed the revocation.

== Documentary ==
In April 2023, Canadian Youtuber BobbyBroccoli (Kevan MacKay) released docu-series Korea’s King of Cloning in two parts titled "The man who faked human cloning" and "How to catch a criminal cloner" on Youtube and on the streaming service Nebula. In June 2023, Netflix released the documentary film King of Clones, which covered Hwang affair.

== See also ==
- He Jiankui affair
