= Lisa Boulanger =

American neuroscientist

Lisa M. Boulanger
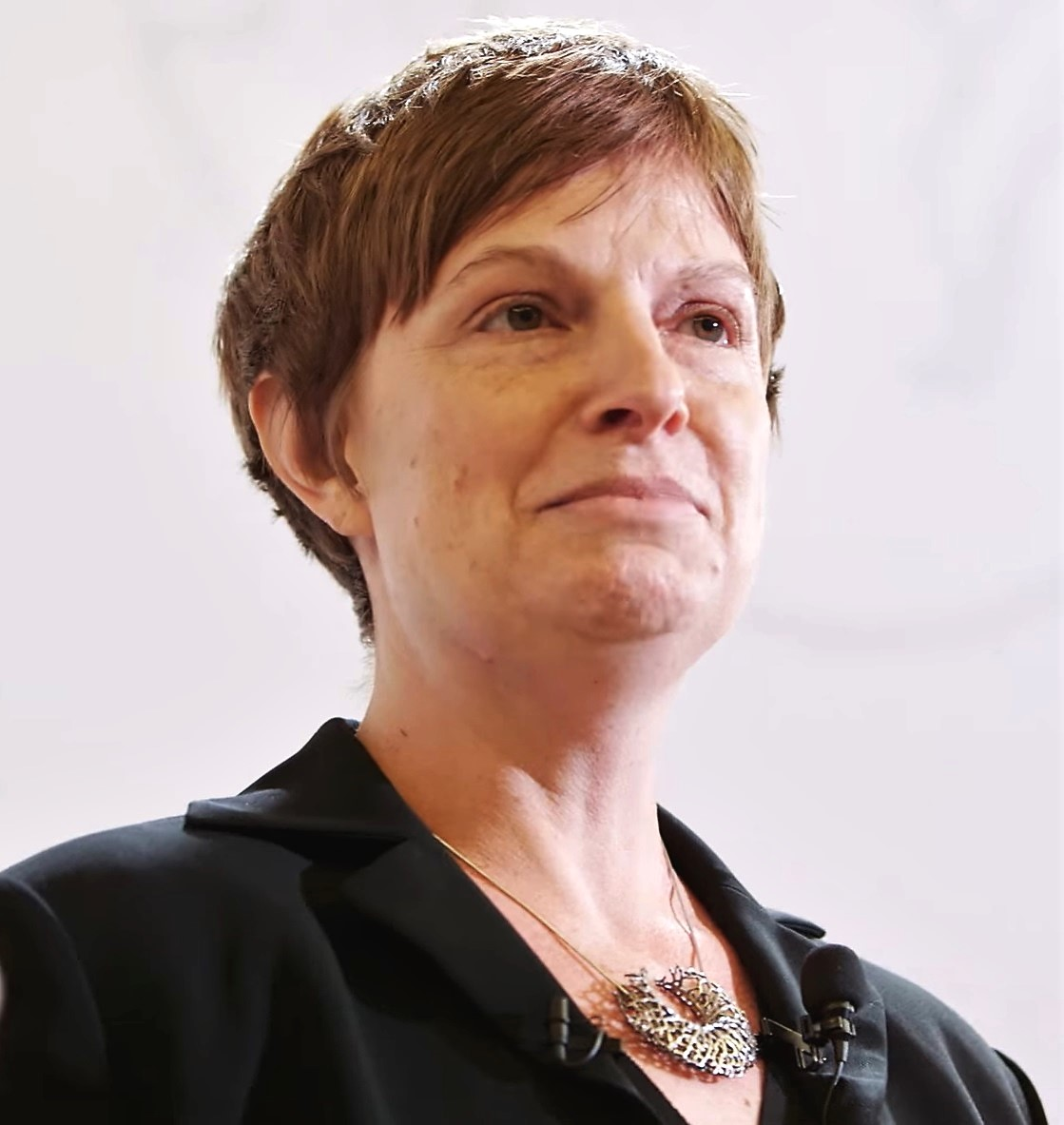
- Boulanger speaks at the 2016 World Economic Forum
- Born: 1969 (age 56–57)
- Education: University of California, San Diego
- Scientific career
- Workplaces: Princeton University; Harvard Medical School; University of California, San Diego
- Thesis: Activity-dependent regulation of the synaptic action of neurotrophin (1998)
- Website: Boulanger Lab

Lisa Boulanger is an American neuroscientist and who is a professor at Princeton University. Her research considers immune proteins in the formation and function of neuronal connectivity.

== Early life and education ==
Boulanger was a doctoral researcher at the University of California, San Diego, where she worked under Mu-ming Poo. Her research considered regulation of the synaptic action of neurotrophin. Afterward she was a postdoctoral researcher at Harvard Medical School with Carla J. Shatz.

== Research and career ==
Boulanger left Harvard Medical School to start her independent scientific career at the University of California, San Diego. She was made the Silvio Varon Professor of Neuroregeneration. She moved her laboratory to Princeton University in 2009.

Boulanger investigates how immune systems proteins are involved in brain development. She has extensively investigated major histocompatibility complex proteins, which enable T cells to destroy infected cancerous cells. It was originally understood that neurons were not visible to the immune system because they lacked MHC class I, but Boulanger has shown that healthy neurons can express MHC class I, and that this expression is regulated by electrical activity. She has shown that major histocompatibility complex proteins are involved in other, non-immune-related brain functions. In the adult hippocampus, major histocompatibility complex proteins are required for long-term potentiation. She makes use of patch clamp and electrophysiology, and the expression of MHC class I in vivo and in vitro.

Boulanger has started investigating the efficacy of viruses that are used to treat nervous system disorders. These include adeno-associated virus, a virus in which viral genes are removed and replaced with more therapeutic genes. She noticed that these viruses can still change the structure of neural circuitry.

== Selected publications ==
- Matthew Belmonte; Greg Allen; Andrea Beckel-Mitchener; Lisa M Boulanger; Ruth A Carper; Sara J Webb (1 October 2004). "Autism and abnormal development of brain connectivity". The Journal of Neuroscience. 24 (42): 9228–9231. doi:10.1523/jneurosci.3340-04.2004. ISSN 0270-6474. PMC 6730085. PMID 15496656. Wikidata Q35924066.
- G S Huh; Lisa M Boulanger; H Du; P A Riquelme; Tilmann M Brotz; C J Shatz (1 December 2000). "Functional requirement for class I MHC in CNS development and plasticity". Science. 290 (5499): 2155–2159. doi:10.1126/science.290.5499.2155. ISSN 0036-8075. PMC 2175035. PMID 11118151. Wikidata Q24669537.
- Belmonte MK; Cook EH Jr; Anderson GM; et al. (1 July 2004). "Autism as a disorder of neural information processing: directions for research and targets for therapy". Molecular Psychiatry. 9 (7): 646–663. doi:10.1038/sj.mp.4001499. ISSN 1359-4184. PMID 15037868. Wikidata Q35705869.
