= Nikos Logothetis =

Greek neuroscientist

Nikos K. Logothetis
- Νίκος Λογοθέτης
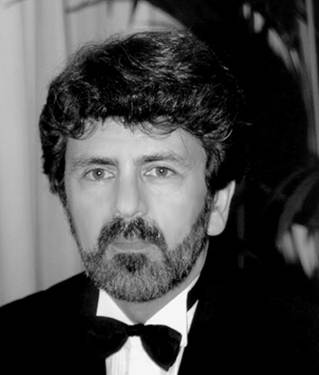
- Born: 5 November 1950 (age 75); Istanbul, Turkey
- Citizenship: Greek
- Education: National and Kapodistrian University of Athens; Aristotle University of Thessaloniki; LMU Munich (PhD)
- Known for: Neurophysiological basis of the BOLD fMRI signal
- Awards: Louis-Jeantet Prize for Medicine (2003); Vyzov Prize (2024)
- Scientific career
- Fields: Neuroscience; Biology; Visual perception
- Workplaces: Massachusetts Institute of Technology; Baylor College of Medicine; Max Planck Institute for Biological Cybernetics; International Center for Primate Brain Research
- Doctoral advisor: Ernst Pöppel

Nikos K. Logothetis (Greek: Νίκος Λογοθέτης; born 5 November 1950 in Istanbul, Turkey) is a Greek biologist and neuroscientist. Logothetis studies visual perception and object recognition and is best known for his work demonstrating that BOLD fMRI data correlate with neuronal activity. From 1996 to 2022 Logothetis directed the Department of Physiology of Cognitive Processes at the Max Planck Institute for Biological Cybernetics in Tübingen. Since 2021 he has served as director of the International Center for Primate Brain Research (ICPBR) in Shanghai, where he co-directs research alongside Chinese neuroscientist Mu-ming Poo.

== Early life and education ==
In the 1970s, Logothetis studied piano at the Hellenic Conservatory of Athens under Georgios Platon, a composer and principal pianist of the Greek National Opera. He was also a founding member of the rock band PeLoMa BoKiou, whose name derived from the surnames of its members: Nikos Daperis, Nikos Logothetis, Takis Marinakis, Vlassis Bonatsos, and Yiannis Kiourtzoglou. Their debut single, "Γαρύφαλλε, Γαρύφαλλε" (Carnation, Carnation), later included on an album, remains well-regarded for its lyrics and emotive quality. The band performed progressive rock, occasionally drawing comparison to Carlos Santana's style, and was regarded as one of Greece's prominent rock groups.

Logothetis received a Bachelor of Science degree in mathematics from the National and Kapodistrian University of Athens and a bachelor's degree in biology from the Aristotle University of Thessaloniki. He completed doctoral studies at LMU Munich under the supervision of Ernst Pöppel, receiving a PhD in human neurobiology in 1985.

== Career ==
Logothetis moved to the United States to take up a postdoctoral fellowship in the Department of Brain and Cognitive Sciences at the Massachusetts Institute of Technology, where he subsequently became a research scientist. In 1990, he joined the faculty of the Division of Neuroscience at Baylor College of Medicine in Houston, Texas, where his research focused on the neurophysiological mechanisms of visual perception and object recognition in the macaque inferior temporal cortex.

In 1996, Logothetis was appointed Scientific Member of the Max Planck Society and director at the Max Planck Institute for Biological Cybernetics in Tübingen, where, in 1997, he established the Department of Physiology of Cognitive Processes. There, he led a research programme combining single- and multi-unit electrophysiology with functional magnetic resonance imaging (fMRI), initially in non-human primates and later extended to rodents. This work led to the establishment of the institute's Magnetic Resonance Center.

Since 2021, Logothetis has served as co-director and senior investigator of the International Center for Primate Brain Research (ICPBR) in Shanghai, an institute affiliated with the Chinese Academy of Sciences and established to conduct large-scale non-human primate research. He co-directs the center with neuroscientist Mu-ming Poo, scientific director of the CAS Center for Excellence in Brain Science and Intelligence Technology.

He is a member of the editorial board for Current Biology.

Logothetis is one of the 2003 winners of the Louis-Jeantet Prize for Medicine.

== Research ==
According to Logothetis, in order to understand a system, a description of it is necessary at all levels. As a result, intracortical cell recording and also modeling and imaging is conducted at all levels in his department. Therefore, in addition to functional magnetic resonance imaging, 'in vivo' spectroscopy is also used, and the working group is researching smart contrast agents (SCA) in order to make functional imaging useful for effects other than haemodynamic response.

From the late 1980s, Logothetis studied the neural basis of visual awareness in macaques using binocular rivalry, in which conflicting images shown to each eye produce an alternating rather than fused percept. With Jeffrey Schall, he found that some neurons in the middle temporal visual area (MT/V5) tracked the monkey's perceptual reports rather than the fixed retinal stimulus. A 1996 study with David Leopold showed that early visual areas such as V1 correlated only weakly with perceptual switches, whereas higher-order ventral stream neurons, especially in inferior temporal (IT) cortex, closely tracked what the animal perceived. These findings led him to argue that neural correlates of awareness become more prevalent at later stages of the visual hierarchy. With Randolph Blake, he later proposed that rivalry reflects competition at multiple levels of the visual system rather than a single site.

In 1999, with Max Planck colleagues, he produced some of the first functional images of the monkey brain using high-field MRI, validating fMRI for primate neuroscience. A 2001 Nature paper then reported the first simultaneous intracortical electrophysiology and fMRI from monkey visual cortex. Comparing local field potentials (LFPs) and spiking activity with the BOLD signal, the study found that LFPs, reflecting synaptic input and local processing rather than a region's spiking output, best predicted the haemodynamic response, indicating that BOLD signals reflect input to and processing within a brain area more than its output to other regions. This conclusion strongly shaped how fMRI data are interpreted. Later work extended the findings to alert monkeys and examined how different LFP frequency bands relate to haemodynamic responses.

Logothetis conducted work on the neural basis of object recognition in macaque IT cortex, using carefully controlled, novel "paperclip" and wire-frame stimuli to examine how single neurons come to represent the shape and viewpoint of learned objects. This work provided some of the first single-cell evidence for view-dependent and view-invariant object representations in the ventral stream and supported view-based, rather than purely structural-description-based, theories of object recognition.

== Animal rights controversy ==
In 2014, a German television station aired footage recorded in Logothetis's lab by an undercover representative of the German Animal Welfare Federation documenting violence and harm to animals that might attain the legal definition of a regulation violation for primates. Logothetis announced in response that he would no longer work with non-human primates in 2015 due to lack of institutional support and protection for his research program. Police raids and investigations at this time did not find evidence of animal regulation violations.

Formal charges were brought against Logothetis and two staff members in August 2017 for allegedly delaying euthanasia to sick animals. On 20 February 2018, the Tübingen district court issued all three scientists a "penalty order," consisting of a fine and a sentence that would be automatically transformed into a conviction, which Logothetis immediately appealed. Following the order's announcement, the Max Planck Society (MPS) removed Logothetis's animal research responsibilities and right to conduct animal experiments.

Logothetis garnered significant support from members of the scientific community who criticized the MPS's decision to impose sanctions on Logothetis before a verdict had been reached regarding the alleged misconduct. The Society for Neuroscience (SfN) and Federation of European Neuroscience Societies (FENS) issued a joint statement in his support, followed by the International Brain Research Organization.

The specific charges Logothetis appealed were dismissed on 19 December 2018. Subsequently, the MPS restored Logothetis's duties at the Institute for Biological Cybernetics.

Influenced by continued skepticism and lack of support for animal research in Germany, Logothetis announced in 2020 that he would move his department to the International Center for Primate Brain Research in Shanghai and co-direct the center with Chinese neuroscientist Mu-ming Poo by late 2020 or early 2021.

== Awards and honours ==
- 1999 Golden Brain Award, Minerva Foundation, University of California, Berkeley
- 2003 Louis-Jeantet Prize for Medicine
- 2004 Klaus Joachim Zülch Prize, Max Planck Society
- 2005 Elected member, German National Academy of Sciences Leopoldina
- 2008 W. Alden Spencer Award
- 2022–2024 Research.com Neuroscience in China Leader Award
- 2024 Vyzov Prize for Future Technologies (Discovery category) – first non-Russian recipient of the award, for his contributions to the development of fMRI and its application to studying human brain activity
- 2025 International Cooperation Award of the Chinese Academy of Sciences
- 2025 Academician of the World Academy for Artificial Consciousness

== Publications ==
- Logothetis, N. K.; Guggenberger, Heinz; Peled, Sharon; Pauls, Jon (1999). "Functional imaging of the monkey brain". Nature Neuroscience. 2 (6): 555–562. doi:10.1038/9210. PMID 10448221. S2CID 21627829.
- Logothetis, N. K.; Sheinberg, D. L. (1996). "Visual object recognition". Annual Review of Neuroscience. 19: 577–621. doi:10.1146/annurev.ne.19.030196.003045. hdl:11858/00-001M-0000-0013-EBB0-3. PMID 8833455. S2CID 14848254.
- Blake, Randolph; Logothetis, N. K. (2001). "Visual competition". Nature Reviews Neuroscience. 3 (1): 1–11. doi:10.1038/nrn701. PMID 11823801. S2CID 8410171.
- Logothetis, N. K.; Pauls, Jon; Auguth, M.; Trinath, T.; Oeltermann, A. (July 2001). "A neurophysiological investigation of the basis of the BOLD signal in fMRI". Nature. 412 (6843): 150–157. Bibcode:2001Natur.412..150L. doi:10.1038/35084005. PMID 11449264. S2CID 969175.
- Logothetis, N. K. (2002). "The neural basis of the blood–oxygen–level–dependent functional magnetic resonance imaging signal". Philosophical Transactions of the Royal Society B. 357 (1424): 1003–1037. doi:10.1098/rstb.2002.1114. PMC 1693017. PMID 12217171.
- Logothetis, N. K. (2003). "The underpinnings of the BOLD functional magnetic resonance imaging signal". Journal of Neuroscience. 23 (10): 3963–3971. doi:10.1523/JNEUROSCI.23-10-03963.2003. PMC 6741096. PMID 12764080.
- Logothetis, N. K.; Pfeuffer, Josef (2004). "On the nature of the BOLD fMRI contrast mechanism". Magnetic Resonance Imaging. 22 (10): 1517–1531. doi:10.1016/j.mri.2004.10.018. PMID 15707801.
- Logothetis, N. K.; Wandell, Brian A. (2004). "Interpreting the BOLD signal". Annual Review of Physiology. 66: 735–769. doi:10.1146/annurev.physiol.66.082602.092845. PMID 14977420.
- Logothetis, N. K. (2008). "What we can do and what we cannot do with fMRI". Nature. 453 (7197): 869–878. Bibcode:2008Natur.453..869L. doi:10.1038/nature06976. PMID 18548064. S2CID 4403097.
