= Mu-ming Poo =

Taiwanese-American neuroscientist (born 1948)

- 蒲慕明
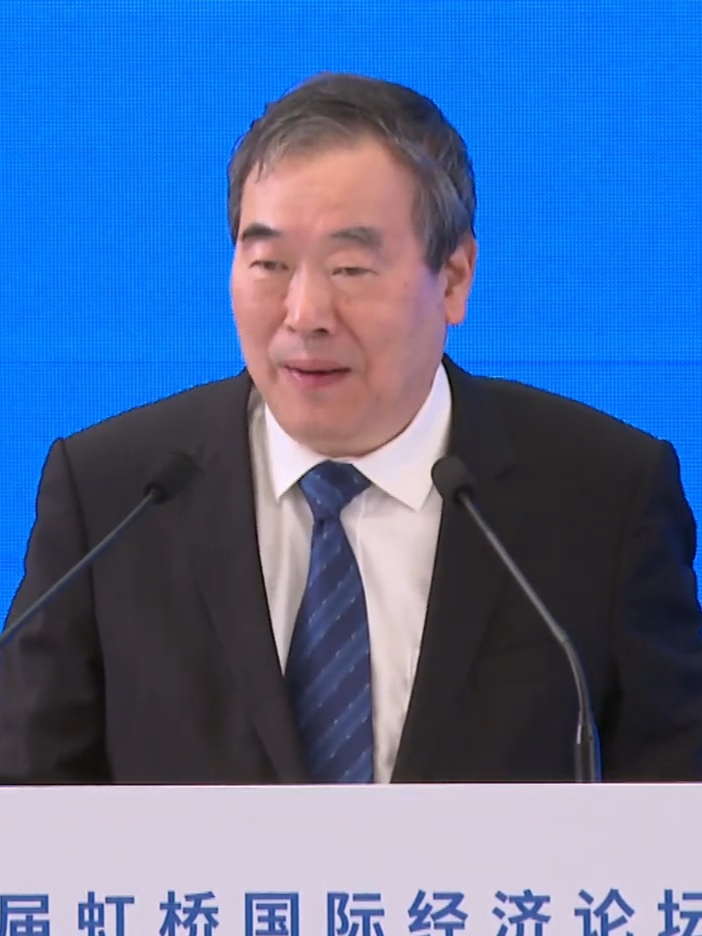
- Poo in 2023
- Born: October 31, 1948 (age 77); Nanjing, Jiangsu, China
- Other names: Pu Mu-ming, Muming Pu, Poon Ming, Moo Ping
- Citizenship: Republic of China (1948–1980s); United States (1980s–2017); People's Republic of China (since 2017)
- Education: National Tsing Hua University (BS); Johns Hopkins University (PhD)
- Known for: Pioneering work on synaptic plasticity, first true cloning of primates
- Spouse(s): Wen-jen Hwu (divorced); Yang Dan
- Children: Ai-jen Poo and Ting Poo
- Awards: Gruber Prize in Neuroscience (2016)
- Scientific career
- Fields: Neuroscience
- Workplaces: Institute of Neuroscience (ION) of the Chinese Academy of Sciences, University of California, Berkeley
- Doctoral students: Lisa Boulanger

Mu-ming Poo (Chinese: 蒲慕明; born October 31, 1948) is a Chinese neuroscientist. He is the Paul Licht Distinguished Professor Emeritus at the University of California, Berkeley and the Founding Director of the Shanghai-based Institute of Neuroscience (ION) of the Chinese Academy of Sciences (CAS). He was awarded the 2016 Gruber Prize in Neuroscience for his pioneering work on synaptic plasticity. At ION, Poo led a team of scientists that produced the world's first truly cloned primates, a pair of crab-eating macaques called Zhongzhong and Huahua in 2017, using somatic cell nuclear transfer (SCNT).

Poo is academicians of National Academy of Sciences (NAS), Academia Sinica, and CAS.

== Early life and education ==
Poo was born in Nanjing, Jiangsu, China, on October 31, 1948. When he was one year old, his family moved to Taiwan during the Great Retreat. Influenced by his father, an aeronautical engineer, he was interested in physics from a young age. He attended National Tsing Hua University in Taiwan, graduating with a bachelor's degree in physics in 1970.

In 1970, he went to the United States to pursue graduate studies at Johns Hopkins University, where he became interested in biophysics and earned a PhD. Under the guidance of Richard Cone, he developed the now widely used method to determine the kinetics of diffusion through cells, fluorescence recovery after photobleaching. His research was published in the major journal Nature in 1974.

== Career in the US ==
After earning his PhD, he was a postdoctoral researcher at Purdue University, and became an assistant professor at the University of California, Irvine in 1976. He developed a new method to manipulate proteins in cell membranes called "in situ electrophoresis".

In 1985, he moved to the Yale School of Medicine to conduct research in proteins and synapses. Later he became a professor at Columbia University and then at the University of California, San Diego in 1996. During this period he made significant discoveries in molecular neurobiology that developed into a new study area on neurotrophins. Poo and his colleagues also invented a new method called the "growth cone turning assay", now widely used in neuroscience for measuring axon growth and guidance in reaction to extracellular guidance molecules and mechanical stimuli.

He moved to the University of California, Berkeley in 2000, where he later became Paul Licht Distinguished Professor in Biology. At Berkeley, he made many new discoveries in understanding the factors that determine the development of axons and dendrites in neurons. He also made important discoveries in synaptic plasticity, demonstrating that spike-timing-dependent plasticity plays a crucial role in neuron connections.

== Career in China ==
In 1999, Poo co-founded the Shanghai-based Institute of Neuroscience (ION) of the Chinese Academy of Sciences and served as its director. For the following decade, he commuted frequently between Berkeley and Shanghai, until the constant traveling took a toll and he decided to focus on his work in Shanghai. He is now a professor emeritus at UC Berkeley. In 2017, he gave up his American citizenship, which he had acquired in the 1980s, and reinstated his Chinese citizenship.

At ION, Poo led a team of Chinese scientists that produced the world's first truly cloned primates, a pair of crab-eating macaques called Zhong Zhong and Hua Hua in late 2017, using somatic cell nuclear transfer (the technique used to create Dolly the sheep) rather than embryo twinning. According to Poo, the principal significance of this event is that it could be used to create genetically identical monkeys for use in animal experiments. Crab-eating macaques are already an established model organism for studies of atherosclerosis, though Poo chose to emphasize neuroscience, naming Parkinson's disease and Alzheimer's disease when he appeared on the radio news program All Things Considered in January 2018.

Poo compares his career to a "random walk": "When I bump into an interesting problem, I work on it for as long as I can contribute. Then I move on."

== Honors and awards ==
Poo is a member of the United States National Academy of Sciences, the Chinese Academy of Sciences, Academia Sinica of Taiwan, and the Hong Kong Academy of Sciences. In 2016, he was awarded the $500,000 Gruber Prize in Neuroscience for his "pioneering and inspiring work on synaptic plasticity".

He is also the recipient of the following awards:

- Fellow of the American Association for the Advancement of Science (AAAS, 2001)
- Ameritec Prize (2001)
- Ray Wu Society Award (2002)
- Honorary Doctoral Degree, École Normale Supérieure, Paris (2003)
- National Prize for International Cooperation, China (2005)
- Qiushi Excellent Scientist Award, China (2010)
- Outstanding Science and Technology Achievement Prize, Chinese Academy of Sciences (2011)
- Honorary Doctoral Degree, Hong Kong University of Science and Technology (2014)

== Personal life ==
Poo married a fellow Taiwanese immigrant to the US, chemist and oncologist Wen-jen Hwu, and they later divorced. They have two daughters: Ting and Ai-jen. Ai-jen Poo (born 1974) is a social activist and writer who won the MacArthur "Genius" Award in 2014. Ting Poo is a filmmaker who was the editor of Heaven Is a Traffic Jam on the 405, which won the Academy Award for Best Documentary (Short Subject) in 2017.

Poo married again, to Yang Dan, his former student at Columbia University. Dan is also a distinguished neuroscientist who was elected to the US National Academy of Sciences in 2018.
