= Somatic cell nuclear transfer =

Method of creating a cloned embryo by replacing the egg nucleus with a body cell nucleus

Somatic cell nuclear transfer can create clones for both reproductive and therapeutic purposes.

In genetics and developmental biology, somatic cell nuclear transfer (SCNT) is a laboratory strategy for creating a viable embryo from a body cell and an egg cell. The technique consists of taking a denucleated oocyte (egg cell) and implanting a donor nucleus from a somatic (body) cell. It is used in both therapeutic and reproductive cloning. In 1996, Dolly the sheep became famous for being the first successful case of the reproductive cloning of a mammal from an adult somatic cell, though contrary to popular belief, she was not the first animal to be cloned. In January 2018, a team of scientists in Shanghai announced the successful cloning of two female crab-eating macaques (named Zhong Zhong and Hua Hua) from foetal nuclei.

"Therapeutic cloning" refers to the potential use of SCNT in regenerative medicine; this approach has been championed as an answer to the many issues concerning embryonic stem cells (ESCs) and the destruction of viable embryos for medical use, though questions remain on how homologous the two cell types truly are.

== Introduction ==
Somatic cell nuclear transfer is a technique for cloning in which the nucleus of a somatic cell is transferred to the cytoplasm of an enucleated egg. After the somatic cell transfers, the cytoplasmic factors affect the nucleus to become a zygote. The blastocyst stage is developed by the egg to help create embryonic stem cells from the inner cell mass of the blastocyst. The first mammal to be developed by this technique was Dolly the sheep, in 1996.

== Early 20th-century ==
Although Dolly is generally recognized as the first animal to be cloned using this technique, earlier instances of SCNT exist as early as the 1950s. In particular, the research of Sir John Gurdon in 1958 entailed the cloning of Xenopus laevis utilizing the principles of SCNT. In short, the experiment consisted of inducing a female specimen to ovulate, at which point her eggs were harvested. From here, the egg was enucleated using ultra-violet irradiation to disable the egg's pronucleus. At this point, the prepared egg cell and nucleus from the donor cell were combined, and then incubation and eventual development into a tadpole proceeded. Gurdon's application of SCNT differs from more modern applications and even applications used on other model systems of the time (i.e., Rana pipiens) due to his usage of UV irradiation to enucleate the egg instead of using a pipette to remove the nucleus from the egg.

== Process ==
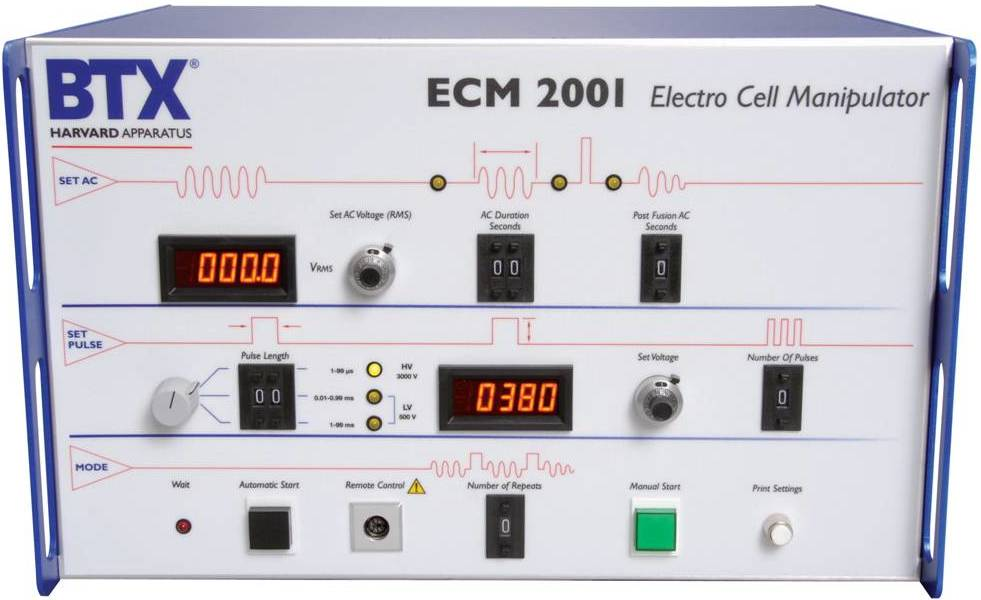
BTX ECM 2001 electrofusion generator used for SCNT and Cloning applications

The process of somatic cell nuclear transfer involves two different cells. The first being a female gamete, known as the ovum (egg/oocyte). In human SCNT experiments, these eggs are obtained through consenting donors, utilizing ovarian stimulation. The second being a somatic cell, referring to the cells of the human body. Skin cells, fat cells, and liver cells are only a few examples. The genetic material of the donor egg cell is removed and discarded, leaving it 'deprogrammed.' What is left is a somatic cell and an enucleated egg cell. These are then fused by inserting the somatic cell into the 'empty' ovum. After being inserted into the egg, the somatic cell nucleus is reprogrammed by its host egg cell. The ovum, now containing the somatic cell's nucleus, is stimulated with a shock and will begin to divide. The egg is now viable and capable of producing an adult organism containing all necessary genetic information from just one parent. Development will ensue normally and after many mitotic divisions, the single cell forms a blastocyst (an early stage embryo with about 100 cells) with an identical genome to the original organism (i.e. a clone). Stem cells can then be obtained by the destruction of this clone embryo for use in therapeutic cloning or in the case of reproductive cloning the clone embryo is implanted into a host mother for further development and brought to term.

Conventional SCNT requires the use of micromanipulators, which are expensive machines used to accurately manipulate cells. Using the micromanipulator, a scientist makes an opening in the zona pellucida and sucks out the egg cell's original nucleus using a pipette. They then make another opening to a different pipette to inject the donor nucleus. Alternatively, electric energy can be applied to fuse the empty egg cell with a donor cell containing a nucleus.

An alternative technique called "handmade cloning" was described by Indian scientists in 2001. This technique requires no use of a micromanipulator and has been used for the cloning of several livestock species. Removal of the nucleus can be done chemically, by centrifuge, or with the use of a blade. The empty egg is glued to the donor cell with phytohaemagglutinin, then fused using electricity. (If a blade is used, two fusion steps would be required: the first fusion is between the donor and an empty half-egg, the second between the half-size "demi-embryo" and another empty half-egg.)

== Applications ==
=== Stem cell research ===
Somatic cell nuclear transplantation has become a focus of study in stem cell research. The aim of carrying out this procedure is to obtain pluripotent cells from a cloned embryo. These cells genetically matched the donor organism from which they came. This gives them the ability to create patient specific pluripotent cells, which could then be used in therapies or disease research.

Embryonic stem cells are undifferentiated cells of an embryo. These cells are deemed to have a pluripotent potential because they have the ability to give rise to all of the tissues found in an adult organism. This ability allows stem cells to create any cell type, which could then be transplanted to replace damaged or destroyed cells. Controversy surrounds human ESC work due to the destruction of viable human embryos, leading scientists to seek alternative methods of obtaining pluripotent stem cells, SCNT is one such method.

A potential use of stem cells genetically matched to a patient would be to create cell lines that have genes linked to a patient's particular disease. By doing so, an in vitro model could be created, would be useful for studying that particular disease, potentially discovering its pathophysiology, and discovering therapies. For example, if a person with Parkinson's disease donated their somatic cells, the stem cells resulting from SCNT would have genes that contribute to Parkinson's disease. The disease specific stem cell lines could then be studied in order to better understand the condition.

Another application of SCNT stem cell research is using the patient specific stem cell lines to generate tissues or even organs for transplant into the specific patient. The resulting cells would be genetically identical to the somatic cell donor, thus avoiding any complications from immune system rejection.

Only a handful of the labs in the world are currently using SCNT techniques in human stem cell research. In the United States, scientists at the Harvard Stem Cell Institute, the University of California San Francisco, the Oregon Health & Science University, Stemagen (La Jolla, CA) and possibly Advanced Cell Technology are currently researching a technique to use somatic cell nuclear transfer to produce embryonic stem cells. In the United Kingdom, the Human Fertilisation and Embryology Authority has granted permission to research groups at the Roslin Institute and the Newcastle Centre for Life. SCNT may also be occurring in China.

Though there has been numerous successes with cloning animals, questions remain concerning the mechanisms of reprogramming in the ovum. Despite many attempts, success in creating human nuclear transfer embryonic stem cells has been limited. There lies a problem in the human cell's ability to form a blastocyst; the cells fail to progress past the eight cell stage of development. This is thought to be a result from the somatic cell nucleus being unable to turn on embryonic genes crucial for proper development. These earlier experiments used procedures developed in non-primate animals with little success.

A research group from the Oregon Health & Science University demonstrated SCNT procedures developed for primates successfully using skin cells. The key to their success was utilizing oocytes in metaphase II (MII) of the cell cycle. Egg cells in MII contain special factors in the cytoplasm that have a special ability in reprogramming implanted somatic cell nuclei into cells with pluripotent states. When the ovum's nucleus is removed, the cell loses its genetic information. This has been blamed for why enucleated eggs are hampered in their reprogramming ability. It is theorized the critical embryonic genes are physically linked to oocyte chromosomes, enucleation negatively affects these factors. Another possibility is removing the egg nucleus or inserting the somatic nucleus causes damage to the cytoplast, affecting reprogramming ability.

Taking this into account the research group applied their new technique in an attempt to produce human SCNT stem cells. In May 2013, the Oregon group reported the successful derivation of human embryonic stem cell lines derived through SCNT, using fetal and infant donor cells. Using MII oocytes from volunteers and their improved SCNT procedure, human clone embryos were successfully produced. These embryos were of poor quality, lacking a substantial inner cell mass and poorly constructed trophectoderm. The imperfect embryos prevented the acquisition of human ESC. The addition of caffeine during the removal of the ovum's nucleus and fusion of the somatic cell and the egg improved blastocyst formation and ESC isolation. The ESC obtain were found to be capable of producing teratomas, expressed pluripotent transcription factors, and expressed a normal 46XX karyotype, indicating these SCNT were in fact ESC-like. This was the first instance of successfully using SCNT to reprogram human somatic cells. This study used fetal and infantile somatic cells to produce their ESC.

In April 2014, an international research team expanded on this break through. There remained the question of whether the same success could be accomplished using adult somatic cells. Epigenetic and age related changes were thought to possibly hinder an adult somatic cells ability to be reprogrammed. Implementing the procedure pioneered by the Oregon research group they indeed were able to grow stem cells generated by SCNT using adult cells from two donors aged 35 and 75, indicating that age does not impede a cell's ability to be reprogrammed.

Late April 2014, the New York Stem Cell Foundation was successful in creating SCNT stem cells derived from adult somatic cells. One of these lines of stem cells was derived from the donor cells of a type 1 diabetic. The group was then able to successfully culture these stem cells and induce differentiation. When injected into mice, cells of all three of the germ layers successfully formed. The most significant of these cells, were those who expressed insulin and were capable of secreting the hormone. These insulin producing cells could be used for replacement therapy in diabetics, demonstrating real SCNT stem cell therapeutic potential.

The impetus for SCNT-based stem cell research has been decreased by the development and improvement of alternative methods of generating stem cells. Methods to reprogram normal body cells into pluripotent stem cells were developed in humans in 2007. The following year, this method achieved a key goal of SCNT-based stem cell research: the derivation of pluripotent stem cell lines that have all genes linked to various diseases. Some scientists working on SCNT-based stem cell research have recently moved to the new methods of induced pluripotent stem cells. Though recent studies have put in question how similar iPS cells are to embryonic stem cells. Epigenetic memory in iPS affects the cell lineage it can differentiate into. For instance, an iPS cell derived from a blood cell using only the yamanaka factors will be more efficient at differentiating into blood cells, while it will be less efficient at creating a neuron. Recent studies indicate however that changes to the epigenetic memory of iPSCs using small molecules can reset them to an almost naive state of pluripotency. Studies have even shown that via tetraploid complementation, an entire viable organism can be created solely from iPSCs. SCNT stem cells have been found to have similar challenges. The cause for low yields in bovine SCNT cloning has, in recent years, been attributed to the previously hidden epigenetic memory of the somatic cells that were being introduced into the oocyte.

=== Reproductive cloning ===
This technique is currently the basis for cloning animals (such as the famous Dolly the sheep), and has been proposed as a possible way to clone humans. Using SCNT in reproductive cloning has proven difficult with limited success. High fetal and neonatal death make the process very inefficient. Resulting cloned offspring are also plagued with development and imprinting disorders in non-human species. For these reasons, along with moral and ethical objections, reproductive cloning in humans is proscribed in more than 30 countries. Most researchers believe that in the foreseeable future it will not be possible to use the current cloning technique to produce a human clone that will develop to term. It remains a possibility, though critical adjustments will be required to overcome current limitations during early embryonic development in human SCNT.

There is also the potential for treating diseases associated with mutations in mitochondrial DNA. Recent studies show SCNT of the nucleus of a body cell afflicted with one of these diseases into a healthy oocyte prevents the inheritance of the mitochondrial disease. This treatment does not involve cloning but would produce a child with three genetic parents. A father providing a sperm cell, one mother providing the egg nucleus, and another mother providing the enucleated egg cell.

In 2018, the first successful cloning of primates using somatic cell nuclear transfer, the same method as Dolly the sheep, with the birth of two live female clones (crab-eating macaques named Zhong Zhong and Hua Hua) was reported.

=== Interspecies nuclear transfer ===
Interspecies nuclear transfer (iSCNT) is a means of somatic cell nuclear transfer being used to facilitate the rescue of endangered species, or even to restore species after their extinction. The technique is similar to SCNT cloning which typically is between domestic animals and rodents, or where there is a ready supply of oocytes and surrogate animals. However, the cloning of highly endangered or extinct species requires the use of an alternative method of cloning. Interspecies nuclear transfer utilizes a host and a donor of two different organisms that are closely related species and within the same genus. In 2000, Robert Lanza was able to produce a cloned fetus of a gaur, Bos gaurus, combining it successfully with a domestic cow, Bos taurus.

In 2017, the first cloned Bactrian camel was born through iSCNT, using oocytes of dromedary camel and skin fibroblast cells of an adult Bactrian camel as donor nuclei.

== Limitations ==
Somatic cell nuclear transfer (SCNT) can be inefficient due to stresses placed on both the egg cell and the introduced nucleus. This can result in a low percentage of successfully reprogrammed cells. For example, in 1996 Dolly the sheep was born after 277 eggs were used for SCNT, which created 29 viable embryos, giving it a measly 0.3% efficiency. Only three of these embryos survived until birth, and only one survived to adulthood. Millie, the offspring that survived, took 95 attempts to produce. Because the procedure was not automated and had to be performed manually under a microscope, SCNT was very resource intensive. Another reason why there is such high mortality rate with the cloned offspring is due to the fetus being larger than even other large offspring, resulting in death soon after birth. The biochemistry involved in reprogramming the differentiated somatic cell nucleus and activating the recipient egg was also far from understood. Another limitation is trying to use one-cell embryos during the SCNT. When using just one-cell cloned embryos, the experiment has a 65% chance to fail in the process of making morula or blastocyst. The biochemistry also has to be extremely precise, as most late term cloned fetus deaths are the result of inadequate placentation. However, by 2014, researchers were reporting success rates of 70-80% with cloning pigs and in 2016 a Korean company, Sooam Biotech, was reported to be producing 500 cloned embryos a day.

In SCNT, not all of the donor cell's genetic information is transferred, as the donor cell's mitochondria that contain their own mitochondrial DNA are left behind. The resulting hybrid cells retain those mitochondrial structures which originally belonged to the egg. As a consequence, clones such as Dolly that are born from SCNT are not perfect copies of the donor of the nucleus. This fact may also hamper the potential benefits of SCNT-derived tissues and organs for therapy, as there may be an immuno-response to the non-self mtDNA after transplant. Additionally, the genes found in the mitochondria's genome need to communicate with the cell's genome and a failure of somatic cell nuclear reprogramming can lead to non-communication to the cell's genome causing SCNT to fail.

Epigenetic factors play an important role in the success or failure of SCNT attempts. The varying gene expression of a previously activated cell and its mRNAs may lead to overexpression, underexpression, or in some cases non-functional genes which will affect the developing fetus. One such example of epigenetic limitations to SCNT is regulating histone methylation. Differing regulation of these histone methylation genes can directly affect the transcription of the developing genome, causing failure of the SCNT. Another contributing factor to failure of SCNT includes the X chromosome inactivation in early development of the embryo. A non-coding gene called XIST is responsible for inactivating one X chromosome during development, but in SCNT this gene can have abnormal regulation causing mortality to the developing fetus.

== Controversy ==
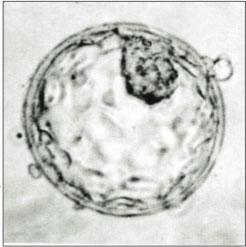
Human blastocyst, showing the inner cell mass (top, right)

Nuclear transfer techniques present a different set of ethical considerations than those associated with the use of other stem cells like embryonic stem cells which are controversial for their requirement to destroy an embryo. These different considerations have led to some individuals and organizations who are not opposed to human embryonic stem cell research to be concerned about, or opposed to, SCNT research.

One concern is that blastula creation in SCNT-based human stem cell research will lead to the reproductive cloning of humans. Both processes use the same first step: the creation of a nuclear transferred embryo, most likely via SCNT. Those who hold this concern often advocate for strong regulation of SCNT to preclude implantation of any derived products for the intention of human reproduction, or its prohibition.

A second important concern is the appropriate source of the eggs that are needed. SCNT requires human egg cells, which can only be obtained from women. The most common source of these eggs today are eggs that are produced and in excess of the clinical need during IVF treatment. This is a minimally invasive procedure, but it does carry some health risks, such as ovarian hyperstimulation syndrome.

One vision for successful stem cell therapies is to create custom stem cell lines for patients. Each custom stem cell line would consist of a collection of identical stem cells each carrying the patient's own DNA, thus reducing or eliminating any problems with rejection when the stem cells were transplanted for treatment. For example, to treat a man with Parkinson's disease, a cell nucleus from one of his cells would be transplanted by SCNT into an egg cell from an egg donor, creating a unique lineage of stem cells almost identical to the patient's own cells. (There would be differences. For example, the mitochondrial DNA would be the same as that of the egg donor. In comparison, his own cells would carry the mitochondrial DNA of his mother.)

Potentially millions of patients could benefit from stem cell therapy, and each patient would require a large number of donated eggs in order to successfully create a single custom therapeutic stem cell line. Such large numbers of donated eggs would exceed the number of eggs currently left over and available from couples trying to have children through assisted reproductive technology. Therefore, healthy young women would need to be induced to sell eggs to be used in the creation of custom stem cell lines that could then be purchased by the medical industry and sold to patients. It is so far unclear where all these eggs would come from.

Stem cell experts consider it unlikely that such large numbers of human egg donations would occur in a developed country because of the unknown long-term public health effects of treating large numbers of healthy young women with heavy doses of hormones in order to induce hyper-ovulation (ovulating several eggs at once). Although such treatments have been performed for several decades now, the long-term effects have not been studied or declared safe to use on a large scale on otherwise healthy women. Longer-term treatments with much lower doses of hormones are known to increase the rate of cancer decades later. Whether hormone treatments to induce hyper-ovulation could have similar effects is unknown. There are also ethical questions surrounding paying for eggs. In general, marketing body parts is considered unethical and is banned in most countries. Human eggs have been a notable exception to this rule for some time.

To address the problem of creating a human egg market, some stem cell researchers are investigating the possibility of creating artificial eggs. If successful, human egg donations would not be needed to create custom stem cell lines. However, this technology may be a long way off.

== Policies regarding human SCNT ==
SCNT involving human cells is currently legal for research purposes in the United Kingdom, having been incorporated into the Human Fertilisation and Embryology Act 1990. Permission must be obtained from the Human Fertilisation and Embryology Authority in order to perform or attempt SCNT.

In the United States, the practice remains legal, as it has not been addressed by federal law. However, in 2002, a moratorium on United States federal funding for SCNT prohibits funding the practice for the purposes of research. Thus, though legal, SCNT cannot be federally funded. American scholars have recently argued that because the product of SCNT is a clone embryo, rather than a human embryo, these policies are morally wrong and should be revised.

In 2003, the United Nations adopted a proposal submitted by Costa Rica, calling on member states to "prohibit all forms of human cloning in as much as they are incompatible with human dignity and the protection of human life." This phrase may include SCNT, depending on interpretation.

The Council of Europe's Convention on Human Rights and Biomedicine and its Additional Protocol to the Convention for the Protection of Human Rights and Dignity of the Human Being with regard to the Application of Biology and Medicine, on the Prohibition of Cloning Human Being appear to ban SCNT of human beings. Of the Council's 45 member states, the Convention has been signed by 31 and ratified by 18. The Additional Protocol has been signed by 29 member nations and ratified by 14.

== Experimental research ==
Experimentally inducing a reductive division called mitomeiosis in human somatic cells within enucleated oocytes can halve the diploid chromosome set and produce embryos with combined somatic and sperm-derived chromosomes, though it remains a proof of concept requiring further research. This could eventually help infertile individuals or same-sex couples have genetically related children.

== See also ==
- Embryogenesis
- Handmade cloning
- In vitro fertilisation
- New Jersey legislation S1909/A2840
- Rejuvenation
- Stem cell controversy
- Stem cell research
