= Zhong Zhong and Hua Hua =

World's first cloned primates (born 2017)

Zhong Zhong and Hua Hua 中中 / 华华
- Species: Macaca fascicularis
- Sex: Female
- Born: Zhong Zhong; 27 November 2017 (age 8 years); Hua Hua; 5 December 2017 (age 8 years); Shanghai, China
- Nationality: China
- Known for: First primates to be cloned using the somatic cell nuclear transfer method

Zhong Zhong (Chinese: 中中; pinyin: Zhōng Zhōng, born 27 November 2017) and Hua Hua (Chinese: 华华; pinyin: Huá Huá, born 5 December 2017) are a pair of identical crab-eating macaques (also referred to as cynomolgus monkeys) that were created through somatic cell nuclear transfer (SCNT), the same cloning technique that produced Dolly the sheep in 1996. They are the first cloned primates produced by this technique. Unlike previous attempts to clone monkeys, the donated nuclei came from fetal cells, not embryonic cells. The primates were born from two independent surrogate pregnancies at the Institute of Neuroscience of the Chinese Academy of Sciences in Shanghai.

== Background ==
Since scientists produced the first cloned mammal Dolly the sheep in 1996 using the somatic cell nuclear transfer (SCNT) technique, 23 mammalian species have been successfully cloned, including cattle, cats, dogs, horses and rats. Using this technique for primates had never been successful and no pregnancy had lasted more than 80 days. The main difficulty was likely the proper programming of the transferred nuclei to support the growth of the embryo. Tetra (born October 1999), a female rhesus macaque, was created by a team led by Gerald Schatten of the Oregon National Primate Research Center using a different technique, called "embryo splitting". She is the first cloned primate by artificial twinning, which is a much less complex procedure than the DNA transfer used for the creation of Zhong Zhong and Hua Hua.

In January 2019, scientists in China reported the creation of five identical cloned gene-edited monkeys, using the same cloning technique that was used with Zhong Zhong and Hua Hua, and the same gene-editing CRISPR-Cas9 technique allegedly used by He Jiankui in creating the first ever gene-modified human babies Lulu and Nana. The monkey clones were made in order to study several medical diseases.

== Process ==
Zhong Zhong and Hua Hua were produced by scientists from the Institute of Neuroscience of the Chinese Academy of Sciences in Shanghai, led by Qiang Sun and Mu-ming Poo. They extracted nuclei from the fibroblasts of an aborted fetal monkey (a crab-eating macaque or Macaca fascicularis) and inserted them into egg cells (ova) that had had their own nuclei removed. The team used two enzymes to erase the epigenetic memory of the transferred nuclei of being somatic cells. This crucial reprogramming step allowed the researchers to overcome the main obstacle that had precluded the successful cloning of primates until now. They then placed 21 of these ova into surrogate mother monkeys, resulting in six pregnancies, two of which produced living animals. The monkeys were named Zhong Zhong and Hua Hua, a reference to Zhonghua (Chinese: 中华, a Chinese name for China). Although the success rate was still low, the methods could be improved to increase survival rate in the future. By comparison, the Scotland-based team that created Dolly the sheep in 1996 required 277 attempts and produced only one lamb.

The scientists also attempted to clone macaques using nuclei from adult donors, which is much more difficult. They implanted 42 surrogates, resulting in 22 pregnancies, but there were still only two infant macaques, and they died soon after birth.

== Implications ==
According to Mu-ming Poo, the principal significance of this event is that it could be used to create genetically identical monkeys for use in animal experiments. Crab-eating macaques are already an established model organism for studies of atherosclerosis, though Poo chose to emphasize neuroscience, naming Parkinson's disease and Alzheimer's disease when he appeared on the radio news program All Things Considered in January 2018.

The birth of the two cloned primates also raised concerns from bioethicists. Insoo Hyun of Case Western Reserve University questioned whether this meant that human cloning would be next. Poo told All Things Considered that "Technically speaking one can clone human[s] ... But we're not going to do it. There's absolutely no plan to do anything on humans."

== See also ==
- List of animals that have been cloned
