= S1909/A2840 =

S1909/A2840 is a bill that was passed by the New Jersey Legislature in December 2003, and signed into law by Governor James McGreevey on January 4, 2004, that permits human cloning for the purpose of developing and harvesting human stem cells. Specifically, it legalizes the process of cloning a human embryo, and implanting the clone into a womb, provided that the clone is then aborted and used for medical research. The legislation was sponsored by Senators Richard Codey (D-Essex) and Barbara Buono, and Assembly members Neil M. Cohen (D-Union), John F. McKeon, Mims Hackett (D-Essex), and Joan M. Quigley (D-Hudson). The enactment of this law will enable researchers to find cures for debilitating and deadly diseases.

== Views regarding the legislation ==
Supporters of the legislation hailed it as promoting medical progress through science, giving hope for the development of treatments for debilitating diseases such as Parkinson's disease, Alzheimer's disease, cancer, and diabetes. Assemblyman Neil Cohen lauded it as "not the most significant law we'll write this session—but this century." Paralyzed actor Christopher Reeve, who believed that such legislation may hasten the development of methods to reverse paralysis, testified in support of the bill.

However, Congressmen Chris Smith, Mike Ferguson, and Scott Garrett assailed it, saying, "This legislation will launch New Jersey blindly into the vanguard of terrible human-rights violations and grisly human experimentation." They also claim that, in practice, once a clone is developing in a womb, there is nothing that will prevent it from leading to "the world's first human clone being born and starting a horrible new era of human history." New Jersey's Catholic bishops condemned the newly legalized process as violating "a central tenet of all civilized codes on human experimentation beginning with the Nuremberg Code...[It approves] doing deadly harm to a member of the human species solely for the sake of potential benefit to others."

== Related policies around the world ==
SCNT is currently legal for research purposes in the United Kingdom, having been incorporated into the 1990 Human Fertilisation and Embryology Act in 2001. Permission must be obtained from the Human Fertilisation and Embryology Authority in order to perform or attempt SCNT.

In the United States, the practice remains legal, as it has not been addressed by federal law.

In 2005, the United Nations adopted a proposal submitted by Costa Rica, calling on member states to "prohibit all forms of human cloning inasmuch as they are incompatible with human dignity and the protection of human life." This phrase may include SCNT, depending on interpretation.

The Council of Europe's Convention on Human Rights and Biomedicine and its Additional Protocol to the Convention for the Protection of Human Rights and Dignity of the Human Being with regard to the Application of Biology and Medicine, on the Prohibition of Cloning Human Being appear to ban SCNT. Of the council's 45 member states, the convention has been signed by 31 and ratified by 18. The Additional Protocol has been signed by 29 member nations and ratified by 14.

== See also ==
- Therapeutic cloning
