= Yang Dan (neuroscientist) =

Chinese-American neuroscientist

- Born: Beijing, China
- Education: Peking University; Columbia University
- Known for: Optogenetics
- Spouse: Mu-ming Poo
- Awards: Alfred P Sloan Research Fellowship, Beckman Young Investigator Award, Edward M. Scolnick Prize, Peter Seeburg Integrative Neuroscience Prize
- Scientific career
- Fields: Neuroscience
- Workplaces: University of California, Berkeley

Dan Yang (Chinese: 丹扬; pinyin: Dān Yáng) is a Chinese-American neuroscientist. She is the Paul Licht Distinguished Professor of Neurobiology at the University of California, Berkeley and a Howard Hughes Medical Institute (HHMI) Investigator. She is a past recipient of the Alfred P. Sloan Research Fellowship, Beckman Young Investigator Award, and Society for Neuroscience Research Awards for Innovation in Neuroscience. Recognized for her research on the neural circuits that control behavior, she was elected to the US National Academy of Sciences in 2018.

Dan's current research is focused on understanding the neural circuits that control sleep in the mammalian brain, as well as how the "frontal cortex exerts top-down executive control."Dan uses the mouse as her model organism combined with optogenetics, imaging, virus-mediated circuit tracing, and electrophysiology.

== Early life and education ==
Dan was born and raised in Beijing, China. She considers her father, a physicist, as a key influence in her decision to become a scientist, together with stories she heard as a child about Albert Einstein and Marie Curie.

Dan graduated from Peking University with a bachelor's degree in physics. She moved to the United States to pursue graduate studies at Columbia University, where she earned her Ph.D. in biology in 1994. Her doctoral advisor was Mu-ming Poo, with whom she conducted research on "cellular mechanisms of neurotransmitter secretion and synaptic plasticity." She subsequently conducted postdoctoral research at the Rockefeller University and later Harvard Medical School, where she looked at information coding in the visual system.

== Career ==
In 1997, Dan began teaching in the Molecular and Cell Biology Department of the University of California, Berkeley, and later became the Paul Licht Distinguished Professor. She is also a Howard Hughes Medical Institute (HHMI) Investigator.

Her research projects include neural circuits controlling sleep and the function of the prefrontal cortex. Dan's lab employs techniques such as optogenetics, electrophysiology, imaging, and virus-mediated circuit tracing to understand how neural circuits regulate sleep and executive control by the frontal cortex. In a 2015 research paper published in Nature, Dan and her team found that activation of GABAergic neurons in the medulla oblongata brain region of sleeping mice causes them to enter REM sleep or the dream state, whereas the same activation in mice when they are awake causes them to eat more.

Dan was elected to the US National Academy of Sciences (NAS) in 2018, in recognition of her "contributions to understanding the microcircuits underlying cortical computation, cellular mechanisms for functional plasticity, and neural circuits controlling sleep", and more generally, her research on the neural circuits that control behavior.

In 2025, after 35 years in the United States, Dan returned to China to become a senior investigator at the Shenzhen Medical Academy of Research and Translation. She was elected a Fellow of the Royal Society in 2026.

== Personal life ==
Dan's husband is Mu-ming Poo, her former academic advisor and also a member of the National Academy of Sciences.
