= Matthew Belmonte =

British researcher

- Born: Matthew Belmonte
- Known for: The Com DEALL Trust
- Scientific career
- Fields: Neuroscience
- Workplaces: Nottingham Trent University
- Website: Official website

Matthew Belmonte is a reader in psychology at Nottingham Trent University who researches the behavior and neurophysiology of autistic individuals. He has studied the behavioral aspects of autism by providing subjects with videogames that measure several perceptual properties. Belmonte has received a $700,000 National Science Foundation grant to study this aspect, and uses MRI and EEG technology to measure brain activity of autistic and non-autistic individuals. He has an older brother with autism, and both have a fascination with order and regularity. In his essay 'Life Without Order: Literature, Psychology, and Autism', Belmonte stated that he was inspired to pursue a career in science because of his need for a single right answer.

Belmonte stated that repetitive behaviors of autistic people are usually associated with nonsocial phenomena as a protection against chaos, claiming that weakened neural connectivity interferes with narrative linkage. Specifically, weakened connections are in the areas of perception, attention, and memory. He has claimed that being a scientist and being autistic are both "compulsions to order", but the thought processes of a scientist are more abstract than thought processes of an autistic. He has written that the autistic mind is more at ease with an orderly environment, where the expectations are known in advance.

Dr. James T. Todd, a professor of psychology, has criticized Belmonte for believing that Tito Mukhopadhyay, a non-verbal autistic individual, can independently write as Belmonte did not explain why the lack of someone touching Tito while writing guarantees authorship, and that simply using a keyboard at a basic level is not difficult.

Belmonte has criticized the neurodiversity movement; Alissa Quart mentions his concerns when she summarizes the view of many parents that the neurodiversity movement is a "dangerous distraction" that could interfere with parents' search for help.
