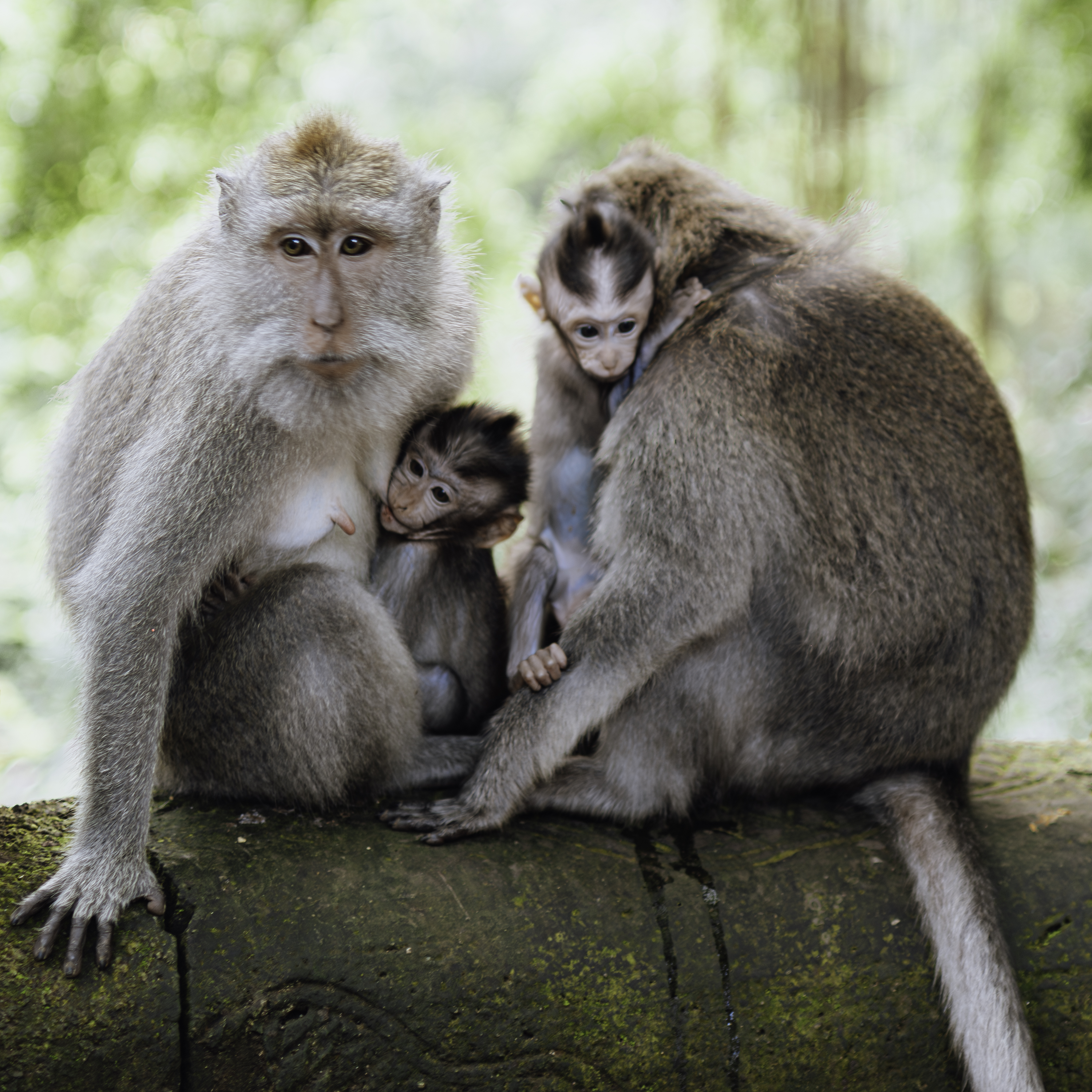
- Crab-eating macaque family in Bali

Conservation status
- Endangered (IUCN 3.1)
- CITES Appendix II

Scientific classification
- Kingdom: Animalia
- Phylum: Chordata
- Class: Mammalia
- Order: Primates
- Family: Cercopithecidae
- Genus: Macaca
- Species: M. fascicularis

Binomial name
- Macaca fascicularis Raffles, 1821
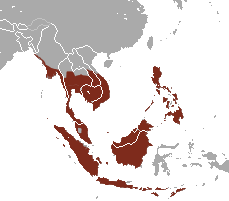
- native range

Synonyms
- Simia cynomolgus Schreber, 1775; Simia aygula Linnaeus, 1758; Macacus carbonarius Cuvier, 1825; Macaca irus Geoffroy,1826; Semnpithecus kra Lesson, 1830

= Macaca fascicularis =

Species of Old World monkey

Macaca fascicularis, variously known by common names such as crab-eating macaque, long-tailed macaque, or cynomolgus monkey, is a macaque species native to Southeast Asia. As a synanthropic species, the crab-eating macaque thrives near human settlements and in secondary forests. The crab-eating macaque has developed a variety of cultural perceptions, from being smart and adaptive, to being sacred, to even being pests in some cases.

The crab-eating macaque is omnivorous and frugivorous. It lives in matrilineal groups ranging from 10 to 85 individuals, with groups exhibiting female philopatry and males emigrating from natal group at puberty. The crab-eating macaque is the only old-world monkey known to use stone tools in their daily foraging, and it engages in a robbing and bartering behavior in some tourist locations.

The crab-eating macaque is the most traded primate species and also the most popular species used in scientific research. Due to these threats, the crab-eating macaque was listed as Endangered on the IUCN Red List in 2022.

== Etymology ==
Macaca comes from the Portuguese word macaco, which was derived from makaku, a word in Ibinda, a language of Central Africa (kaku means monkey in Ibinda). The specific epithet fascicularis is Latin for a small band or stripe. Sir Thomas Raffles, who gave the animal its scientific name in 1821, did not specify what he meant by the use of this word.

In Indonesia and Malaysia, the crab-eating macaque and other macaque species are known generically as kera.

The crab-eating macaque has several common names. It is often referred to as the long-tailed macaque due to its tail, which is the length of their body and head combined. The name crab-eating macaque refers to it being seen foraging beaches for crabs. Another common name for M. fascicularis, often used in laboratory settings, is the cynomolgus monkey which derives from Greek Kynamolgoi meaning "dog milkers". It has also been suggested that cynomolgus refers to a race of humans with long hair and handsome beards who used dogs for hunting according to Aristophanes of Byzantium, who seemingly derived the etymology of the word cynomolgus from the Greek κύων, cyon 'dog' (gen. cyno-s) and the verb ἀμέλγειν, amelgein 'to milk' (adj. amolg-os), by claiming that they milked female dogs.

== Perceptions and terminology ==
The crab-eating macaque is understood and perceived in many ways: smart, pestiferous, exploited, sacred, vermin, invasive.

In 2000 the crab-eating macaque was placed on the list of 100 most invasive species. For example, it is considered an invasive alien species (IAS) on Mauritius, articles argue for long-tailed macaques spreading seeds of invasive plants, competing with native species like the Mauritian flying fox, and having a detrimental impact on native threatened species. Several authors pointed out that the present evidence indicates that predation on birds by monkeys may have been overestimated. Some address these accusations and they point out the crab-eating macaques do not prefer primary forest thus it is unlikely that Mauritius macaques were ever a major source of indigenous forest destruction. The primary driver of bird extinction has been habitat destruction by humans. Sussman and Tattersall mention that the Dutch abandoned the island in 1710–1712 due to monkeys and rats destroying plantations, they point out that the human population was low at this time and the crab-eating macaques would have had plenty of primary forest to exploit, yet they chose to brave the dangers of raiding plantations. They do not deny that macaques on Mauritius prey on bird eggs and disseminate seeds of exotic plants yet the major loss of species on Mauritius is due to habitat loss caused by humans – macaques are successful because they prefer secondary forest and disturbed habitats. This is significant because the perception of crab-eating macaques being invasive and destructive to "native" biodiversity are used as a justification for use in biomedical research.

"Weed" and "non-weed" species are distinguished based on that species ability to thrive in close proximity and association with human settlements. This label was not intentionally proposed to disparage crab-eating macaques but this term, like pest and invasive, can affect how people perceive this species and can trigger negative perceptions.

== Taxonomy ==
Ten subspecies of the crab-eating macaque were proposed:

- M. f. fascicularis – Indonesia, Malaysia, Philippines, Thailand, Cambodia, Singapore, Vietnam
- M. f. aurea – Myanmar, Laos, western and southern Thailand near Myanmar border
- M. f. antriceps – Kram Yai Island, Thailand
- M. f. condorensis – Con Son Island, Hon Ba Island, Vietnam
- M. f. karimondjiwae – Karimunjawa Islands, Indonesia
- M. f. umbrosa – Nicobar Islands, India
- M. f. fusca – Simeulue Island, Indonesia
- M. f. lasiae – Lasia Island, Indonesia
- M. f. tua – Maratua Island, Indonesia
- M. f. philippinensis is under dispute and included with M.f. fascicularis.

M. f. fascicularis has the largest range, followed by M. f. aurea. The other seven subspecies are isolated on small shallow-water fringe-islands and deep-water fringing-islands.

== Evolution ==
The macaque originated in northeastern Africa some 7 million years ago and spread through most of continental Asia by 5.5 million years ago, and subdivided into four groups (sylvanus, sinica, silenus, and fascicularis). The earliest split in the genus Macaca likely occurred ~4.5 mya between an ancestor of the silenus group and a fascicularis-like ancestor from which non-silenus species later evolved. The species of the fascicularis group (which include m. fascicularis, m. mulatta, and m. fuscata) share a common ancestor that lived 2.5 mya. It is suggested that M. fascicularis are the most plesiomorphic (ancestral) taxon in the fascicularis clade, thus it is argued that M. mulatta evolved from a fascicularis-like ancestor that reached mainland from its homeland in Indonesia around 1 mya.

A phylogenetic analysis found evidence that the fascicularis group originated from an ancient hybridization between the sinica and silenus groups ~3.45–3.56 mya, soon after the initial separation of two parent lineages (proto-sinica and proto-silenus) ~3.86 mya. This divergence and subsequent hybridization occurred during rapid glacial-eustatic fluctuations in the early Pleistocene: high sea levels may have led to the initial separation of proto-sinica and proto-silenus while the subsequent lowering of sea levels facilitated the secondary contact needed for hybridization.

Known fossils indicate that crab-eating macaques inhabited the Sunda Shelf since at least early Pleistocene, ~1mya. It is likely that crab-eating macaques were introduced to Timor and Flores (both on the east side of the Wallace line), by humans around 4,000–5,000 years ago. Crab-eating macaques are the only species on both sides of the Wallace line.

The possible stages of crab-eating macaque evolution and dispersal were proposed:

- Stage 1: more than 1 million years ago, crab-eating dispersed into the Sunda Shelf area. Earliest fossil record of crab-eating macaques was found in Java (this collection included H. erectus and leaf monkey species). They probably reached Java by dry land during a period of glacial advance and low sea levels
- Stage 2: around 160 thousand years ago, dispersal and isolation of progenitors of the strongly differentiated deep water fringing island populations occurred. These include M.f. umbrosa, M.f. fusca, M.f., tua [fooden includes M.f. philippinensis but their subspecies status is currently under debate]. It is thought that the progenitors of these subspecies reached deep water habitats during the penultimate glacial maximum when sea levels were lower than present. These populations became isolated during the interglacial period around 120 kya
- Stage 3: more than 18 thousand years ago, the differentiation of progenitors of populations of the Indochinese peninsula and northern part of the isthmus of Kra occurred. These subspecies include M.f. aurea and M.f. fascicularis. These two subspecies became differentiated before the last glacial maximum
- Stage 4: 18 thousand years ago, the dispersal and isolation of progenitors of weakly differentiated deep water fringing island populations occurred (M. f. fascicularis)
- Stage 5: less than 18 thousand years ago, the isolation of the progenitors of shallow water fringing island populations and populations in Penida and Lombok (deep water) occurred. These subspecies include M.f. karimondjawae, M.f. atriceps, M.f. condorensis, M.f. fascicularis
- Stage 6: 4.5 thousand years ago, the dispersal and isolation of progenitors of populations in eastern lesser Sunda islands (deep water), occurred (M.f. fascicularis).

== Characteristics ==
The crab-eating macaque is sexually dimorphic, with males weighing between 4.7 and 8.3 kg (10 and 18 lb) and females weighing 2.5–5.7 kg (5.5–12.6 lb). The height of an adult male is between 412–648 mm (16.2–25.5 in) and 385–505 mm (15.2–19.9 in) for adult females. Its tail is the length of its head and body combined. Dorsal pelage is generally greyish or brownish with a white underbelly with black and white highlights around the crown and face. The face skin is brownish to pinkish except for the eyelids which are white. Adults are usually bearded on and around the face, except for around the snout and eyes. Older females have the fullest beards, with males' being more whisker like. Subspecies on islands seem to have black coloration of their pelage, and large island and mainland subspecies are lighter.

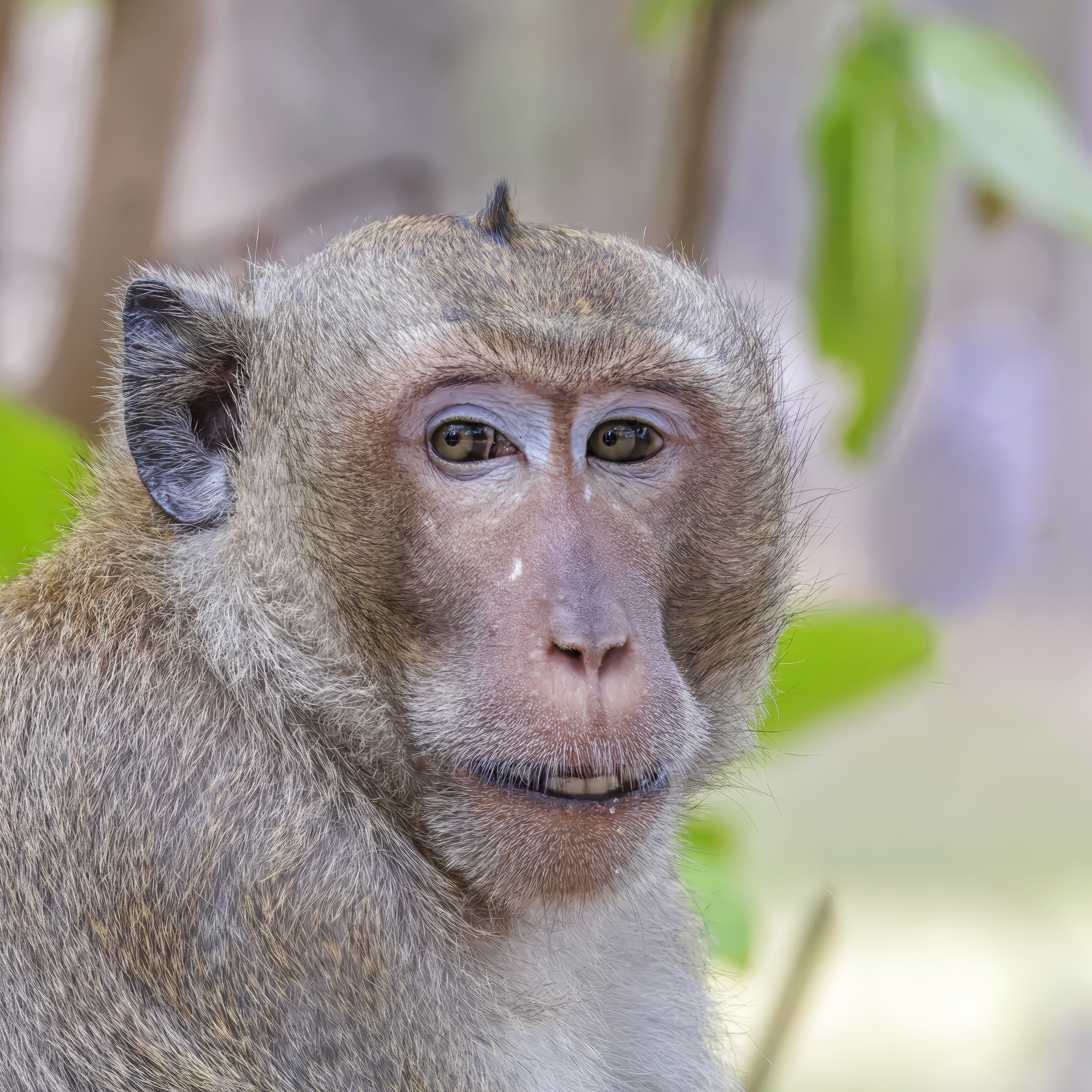
adult male, Cambodia

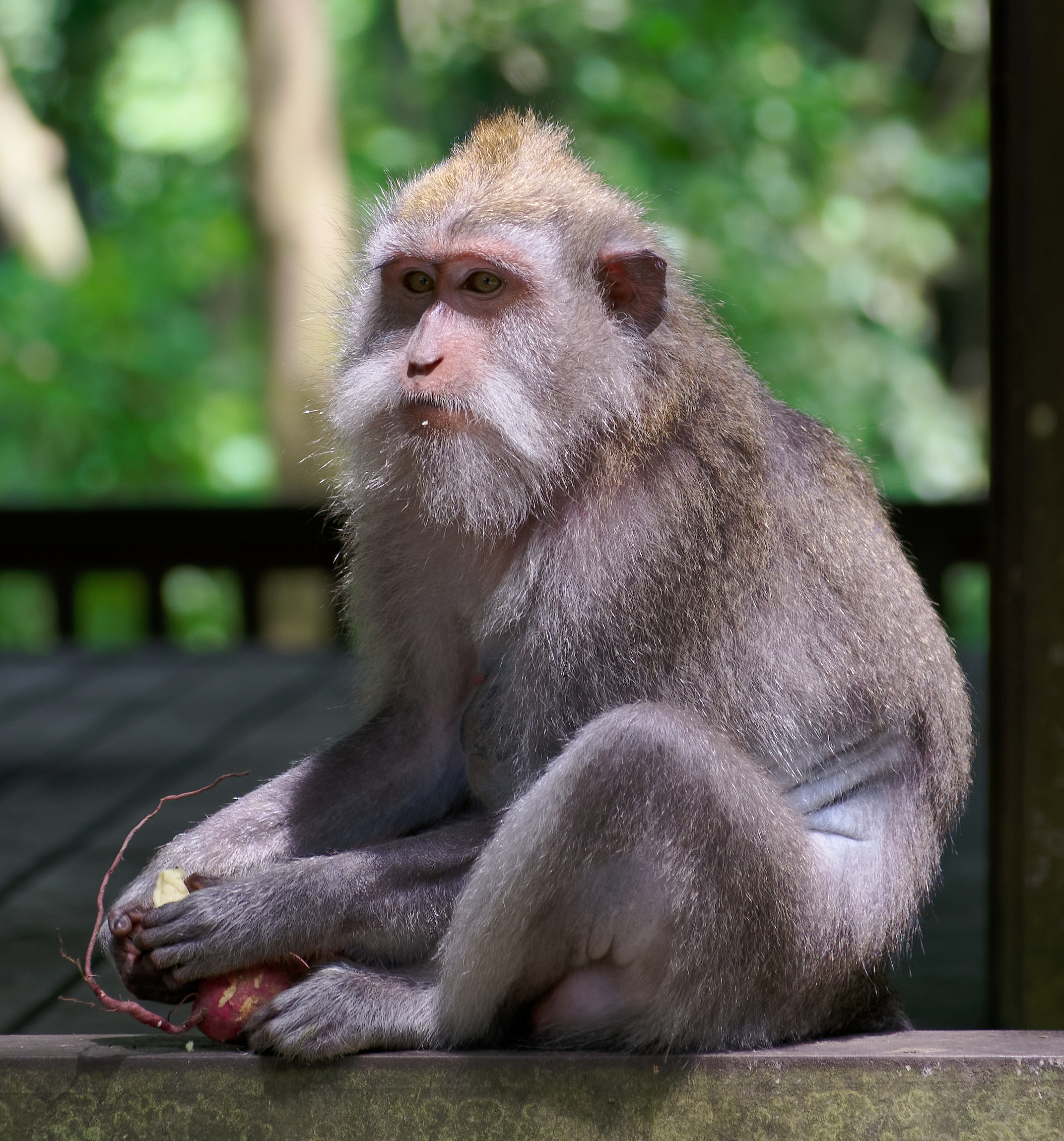
adult female, Bali

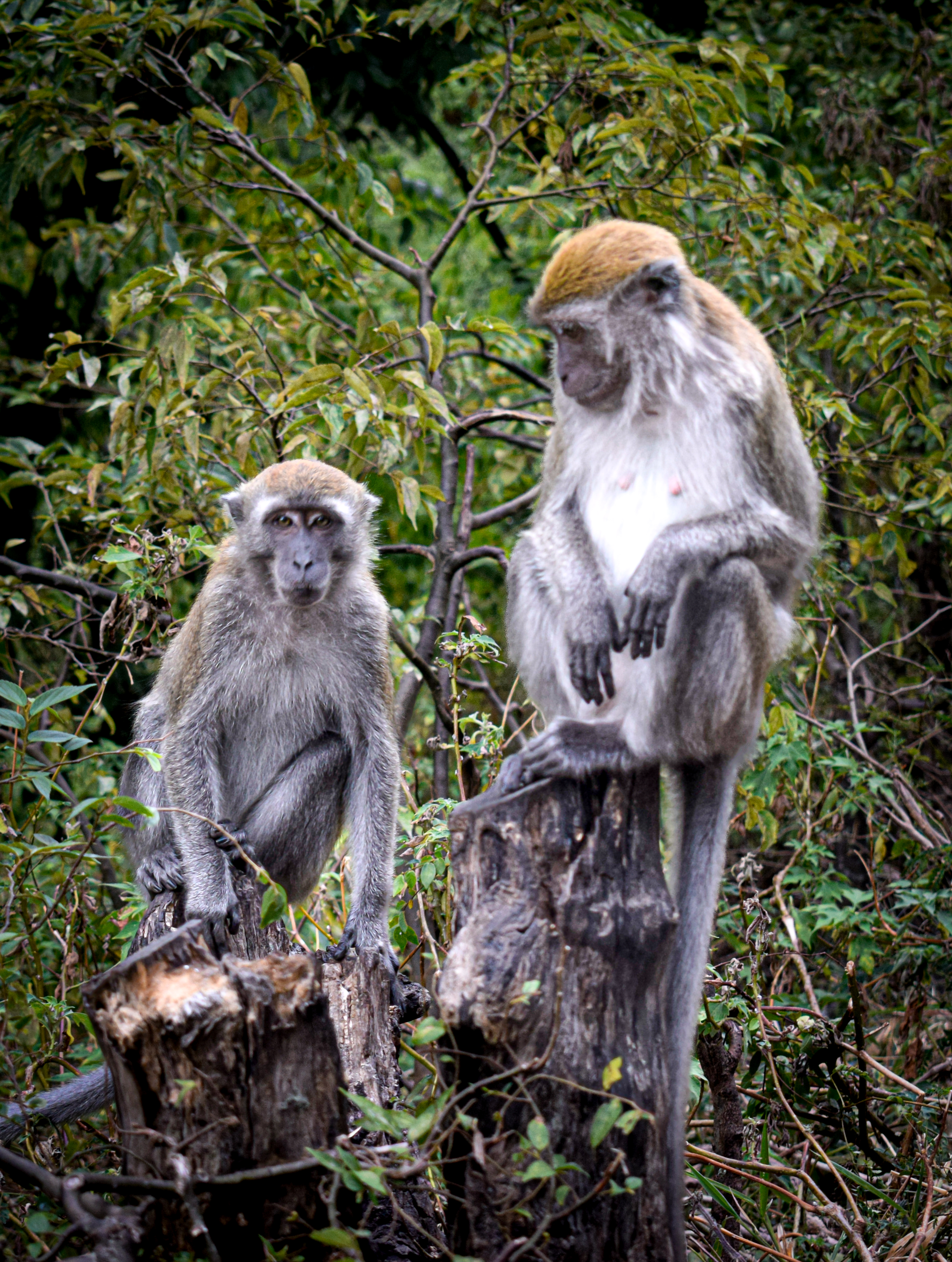
Male & Female, Sumatra

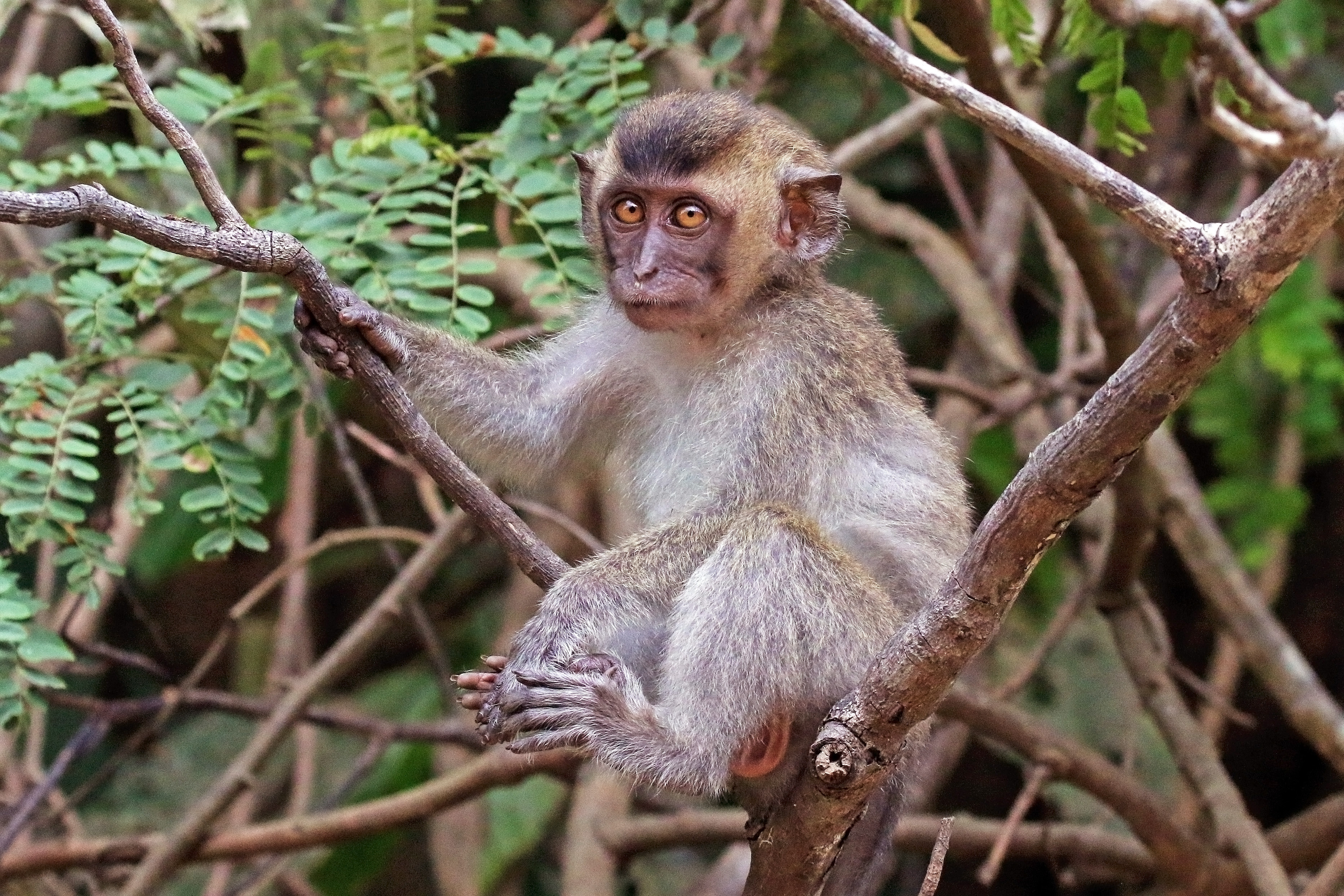
juvenile, Borneo

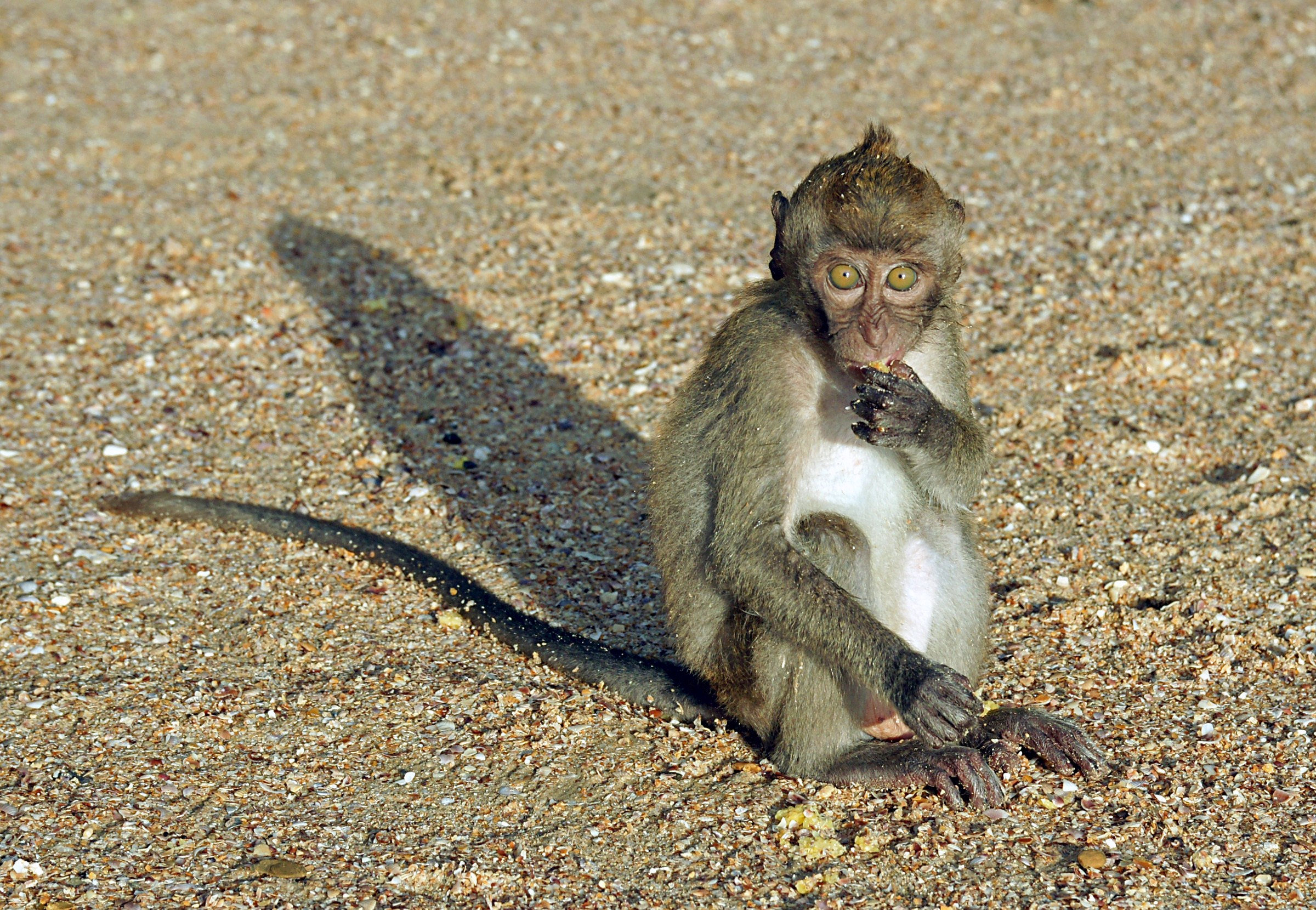
juvenile, Thailand

== Genetics ==
Genomic information
- NCBI ID: 9541
- Ploidy: diploid
- Genome size: 2,946.84 Mb
- Number of chromosomes: 21 pairs

Along the northern part of its range, the crab-eating macaque hybridizes with the rhesus macaque (M. mulatta). It also has been known to hybridize with the southern pig-tailed macaque (M. nemestrina). Hybrids also occur across subspecies too. Rhesus and crab-eating macaques hybridize within a contact zone where their ranges overlap, which has been proposed to lie between 15 and 20 degrees north and includes Thailand, Myanmar, Laos, Vietnam. Their offspring are fertile, and they continue to mate which leads to a broad range of admixture proportions. Introgression from rhesus to crab-eating macaque populations extends beyond Indochina and the Kra Isthmus, whereas introgression from crab-eating to rhesus macaques is more restricted. There seems to be a rhesus biased and male biased gene flow between rhesus and crab-eating macaque populations which has led to different degrees of genetic admixture in these two species.

== Distribution and habitat ==
The crab-eating macaque's native range encompasses most of mainland Southeast Asia, through the Malay Peninsula and Singapore, the Maritime Southeast Asia islands of Sumatra, Java, and Borneo, offshore islands, the islands of the Philippines, and the Nicobar Islands in the Bay of Bengal. This primate is a rare example of a terrestrial mammal that violates the Wallace line, being found out across the Lesser Sunda Islands. It lives in a wide variety of habitats, including primary lowland rainforests, disturbed and secondary rainforests, shrubland, and riverine and coastal forests of nipa palm and mangrove. It also easily adjusts to human settlements and is considered sacred at some Hindu temples and on some small islands, but as a pest around farms and villages. Typically, it prefers disturbed habitats and forest periphery.

=== Introduction to other regions ===
Humans have transported crab-eating macaques to at least five islands: Mauritius, Western New Guinea, Ngeaur, Tinjil Island near Java, and Kabaena Island off of Sulawesi, and to Kowloon Hills of Hong Kong.

There was no indigenous human population on Mauritius. Early exploration of Mauritius by Phoenicians, Swahili people and Arab merchants has been suggested but it was not until the early 16th century that there is hard evidence of human presence on the island, with the Portuguese using it as a refreshing post. The Dutch reached the island in 1598 and attempted a permanent settlement from 1638 to 1658 when they abandoned the island, they resettled again from 1664 to 1710, but abandoned the island again due in part to monkeys and rats destroying plantations. Crab-eating macaques were brought to Mauritius either by the Portuguese or the Dutch in the late 1500s to early 1600s. This founder population likely came from Java, although a mixed origin has been suggested. From the mid-1980s to mid-1990s the population of crab-eating macaques on Mauritius was estimated at 35,000 to 40,000. The present population is not known but estimates indicate it may be as low as 8,000. This significant decline in the population is likely correlated to the booming macaque breeding industry on Mauritius. As crab-eating macaques are considered invasive and destructive this justifies their use in biomedical research. On Mauritius macaques are also perceived as sacred, source of tourism, pets, pest, and food.

Crab-eating macaques first appeared on Ngeaur Island, during German rule in the early 20th century. Population size has fluctuated between 800 and 400 individuals. The population losses due to eradication efforts, yet the population has survived despite typhoons and WWII bombing on the island. In Kowloon Hills there are groups of differing species and their hybrids, where they were released during the 1910s. Rhesus macaques and crab-eating macaques interbred and hybridized. Tibetan macaques were also released but did not interbreed. This location has become a popular tourist attraction. The immunovaccine porcine zona pellucida (PZP), which causes infertility in females, is currently being tested in Hong Kong to investigate its use as potential population control.

Crab-eating macaques have been in West Papua for between 40 and 100 years but this population has not greatly expanded its range, remaining at around 50 to 70 individuals. There is little known of the population on Kabaena Island, Sulawesi. These crab-eating macaques appear to have distinct morphology, which may suggest that they have been on the island for a long period of time.

Between 1988 and 1994, a total of 520 crab-eating macaques including 58 males and 462 females were released on Tinjil Island for the purpose of starting a natural habitat breeding facility. This may be a sustainable way of supplying monkeys for research, but it is in a legal gray area for trading regulations, using captive bred codes (F, C) rather than wild-caught (W).

=== Population size ===
Because crab-eating macaques are synanthropic, enhancing their visibility to humans, this leads to an overestimation in their population size. Researchers have been raising alarms about crab-eating macaque population decline at least since 1986. Many authors cite a 40% decline in the entire crab-eating macaque population between 1980 and 2006. This comes from a population estimate of 5 million in the 1980s-90s. population estimate of 3 million in 2006. It is unclear how the 3 million estimate was reached.

Using a noninvasive probability model to estimate the maximum population abundance, it was estimated that the current population of crab-eating macaques is 1 million, which reflects a continuous decline in the population – 80% reduction over 35 years. This study used a model that overestimated population so the true decline is probably even greater. A population Viability Analysis (PVA) for crab-eating macaques revealed that the presence and absence of females in a population are key to its short and long term viability. Anything that negatively targets females is likely to threaten population viability, e.g., harvesting for biomedical research targets females.

== Behavior and ecology ==
The crab-eating macaque is highly adaptive, living near and benefiting from humans and environmental modifications.

=== Group size and structure ===
Crab-eating macaques live in matrilineal groups ranging from 10 to 85 members, but most often fall in the range of 35–50. Group size varies greatly, especially between non-provisioned and provisioned groups. Large groups live in secondary forest, savanna and thorn scrub vegetation, and urban habitats and temples. Smaller groups live in primary forest, swamp and mangrove forests. Groups will break into subgroups during the day throughout their range. Composition of groups is multi-male/multi-female but females outnumber males with the sex ratio varying between 1:5–6 and 1:2. Groups exhibit female philopatry with males emigrating from natal group at puberty. Males leave natal group as late juveniles or subadults before the age of seven. On average, adult females and juveniles in groups are related at the level of cousins, whereas adult males are unrelated. Higher relatedness in females is expected due to female philopatry.

=== Social organization ===
Macaque social groups have a clear dominance hierarchy among females, these ranks are stable over a female's lifetime and the matriline's rank may be sustained for generations. Matrilines creating interesting group dynamics, for example males are dominant to females at the individual level but groups of closely related females can have some level of dominance over males. The dominant male within a group is not often stable, and males probably change troops several times during their life; rank below the dominant male is not consistent or stable either – males show sophisticated decision-making when it comes to transferring dominance.

=== Intergroup encounters ===
Direct encounters between adjacent non-provisioned troops are relatively rare which suggests mutual avoidance.

=== Interspecific behavior ===
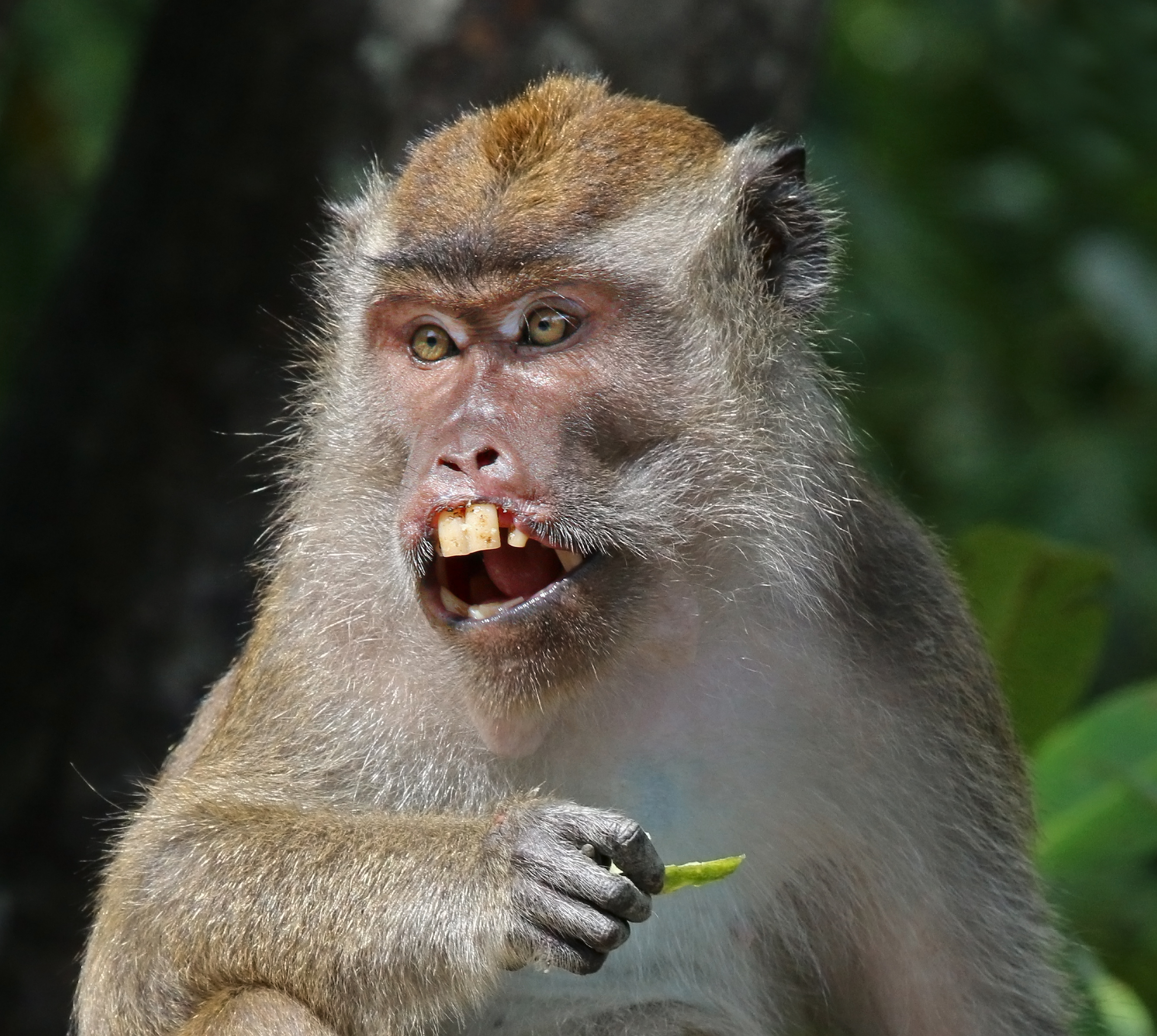
Crab-eating macaque with injury to upper lip

Interactions have been reported between crab-eating and southern pig-tailed macaques, Colobinae species, proboscis monkey, gibbons and orangutans. Dusky leaf monkeys, crab-eating macaques and white-thighed surilis form tolerant foraging associations, with juveniles playing together. Crab-eating macaques have also been observed grooming Raffles' banded langurs in Malaysia.

=== Conflict ===
Group living in all species is dependent on the tolerance of other group members. In crab-eating macaques, successful social group living requires postconflict resolution. Usually, less dominant individuals lose to a higher-ranking individual when conflict arises. After the conflict has taken place, lower-ranking individuals tend to fear the winner of the conflict to a greater degree. In one study, this was seen in the ability to drink water together. Postconflict observations showed a staggered time between when the dominant individual begins to drink and the subordinate. Long-term studies reveal the gap in drinking time closes as the conflict moves further into the past.

Grooming and support in conflict among primates is considered to be an act of reciprocal altruism. In crab-eating macaques, an experiment was performed in which individuals were given the opportunity to groom one another under three conditions: after being groomed by the other, after grooming the other, and without prior grooming. After grooming took place, the individual that received the grooming was much more likely to support their groomer than one that had not previously groomed that individual.

Crab-eating macaques demonstrate two of the three forms of suggested postconflict behavior. In both captive and wild studies, they demonstrated reconciliation, or an affiliative interaction between former opponents, and redirection, or acting aggressively towards a third individual. Consolation was not seen in any study performed. When crab-eating macaques are approached by others while foraging, they tend to move away.

Postconflict anxiety has been reported in crab-eating macaques that have acted as the aggressor. After a conflict within a group, the aggressor appears to scratch itself at a higher rate than before the conflict. Though the scratching behavior cannot definitely be termed as an anxious behavior, evidence suggests this is the case. An aggressor's scratching decreases significantly after reconciliation. This suggests reconciliation rather than a property of the conflict is the cause of the reduction in scratching behavior. Though these results seem counterintuitive, the anxiety of the aggressor appears to have a basis in the risks of ruining cooperative relationships with the opponent.

=== Kin altruism and spite ===
Macaca fascicularis fascicularis at the Bukit Timah Nature Reserve – Singapore. Video Clip

In a study, a group of crab-eating macaques was given ownership of a food object. Adult females favored their own offspring by passively, yet preferentially, allowing them to feed on the objects they held. When juveniles were in possession of an object, mothers robbed them and acted aggressively at an increased rate towards their own offspring compared to other juveniles. These observations suggest close proximity influences behavior in ownership, as a mother's kin are closer to her on average. When given a nonfood object and two owners, one being a kin and one not, the rival will choose the older individual to attack regardless of kinship. Though the hypothesis remains that mother-juvenile relationships may facilitate social learning of ownership, the combined results clearly point to aggression towards the least-threatening individual.

A study was conducted in which food was given to 11 females. They were then given a choice to share the food with kin or nonkin. The kin altruism hypothesis suggests the mothers would preferentially give food to their own offspring. Yet eight of the 11 females did not discriminate between kin and nonkin. The remaining three did, in fact, give more food to their kin. The results suggest it was not kin selection, but instead spite that fueled feeding kin preferentially. This is due to the observation that food was given to kin for a significantly longer period of time than needed. The benefit to the mother is decreased due to less food availability for herself and the cost remains great for nonkin due to not receiving food. If these results are correct, crab-eating macaques are unique in the animal kingdom, as they appear not only to behave according to the kin selection theory, but also act spitefully toward one another.

=== Reproduction ===
After a gestation period of 162–193 days, the female gives birth to one infant. The infant's weight at birth is about 320 g (11 oz). Infants are born with black fur which will begin to turn to a grey or reddish-brown shade (depending on the subspecies) after about three months of age. This natal coat may indicate to others the status of the infant, and other group members treat infants with care and rush to their defense when distressed. Immigrant males sometimes kill infants not their own in order to shorten interbirth intervals. High-ranking females will sometimes kidnap the infants of lower-ranking females. These kidnappings can result in the death of the infants, as the other female is usually not lactating. A young juvenile stays mainly with its mother and relatives. As male juveniles get older, they become more peripheral to the group. Here they play together, forming crucial bonds that may help them when they leave their natal group. Males that emigrate with a partner are more successful than those that leave alone. Young females, though, stay with the group and become incorporated into the matriline into which they were born.

Male crab-eating macaques groom females to increase the chance of mating. A female is more likely to engage in sexual activity with a male that has recently groomed her than with one that has not.

Studies have found that the dominant male copulates more than other males in the group. DNA tests indicate that dominant males sire most of the offspring in natural crab-eating macaque troops. Reproductive success in females is also linked to dominance. High ranking females have more offspring over their life-time than low-ranking females – higher ranking females reproduce at a younger age and their offspring have a higher chance of survival.

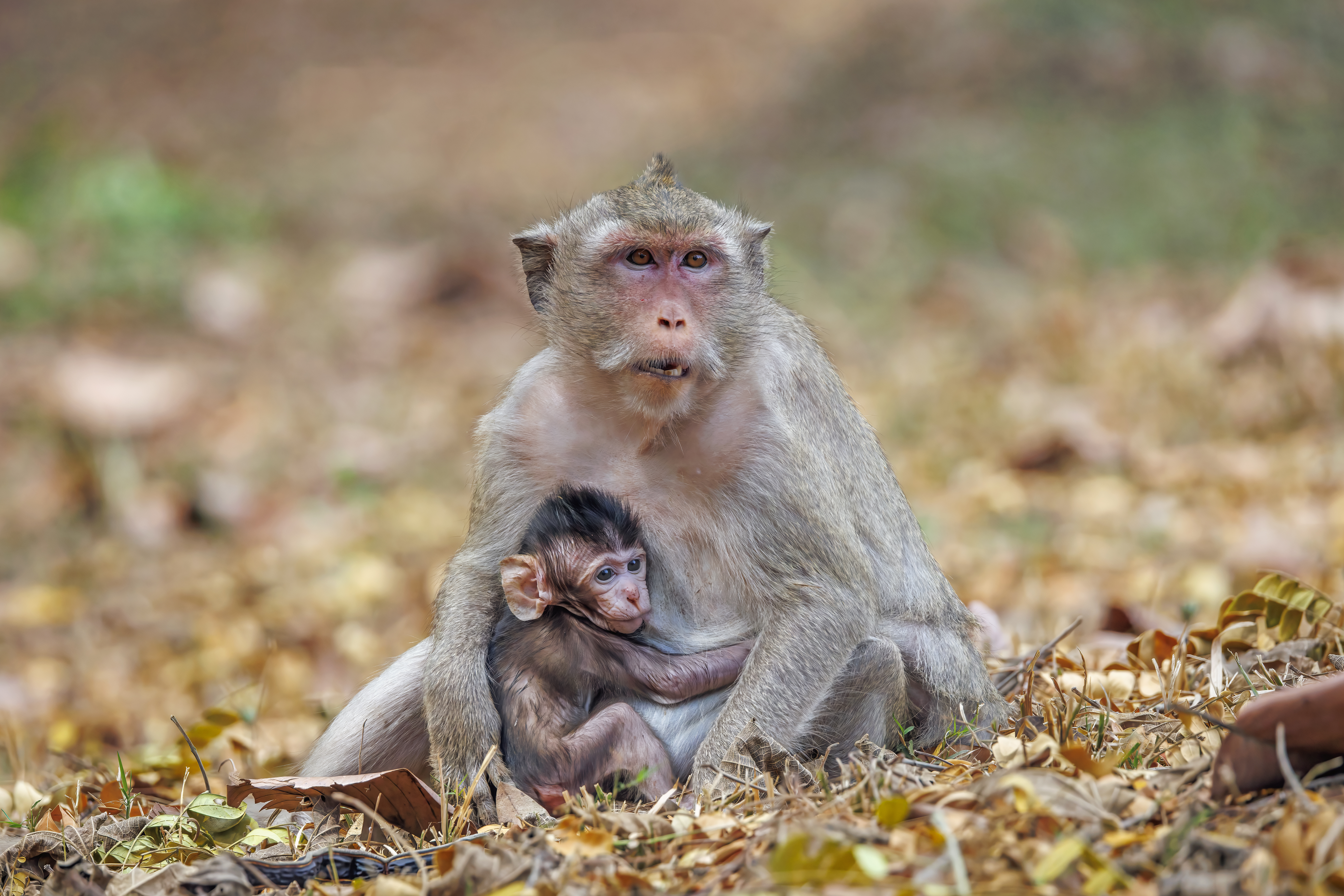
feeding baby

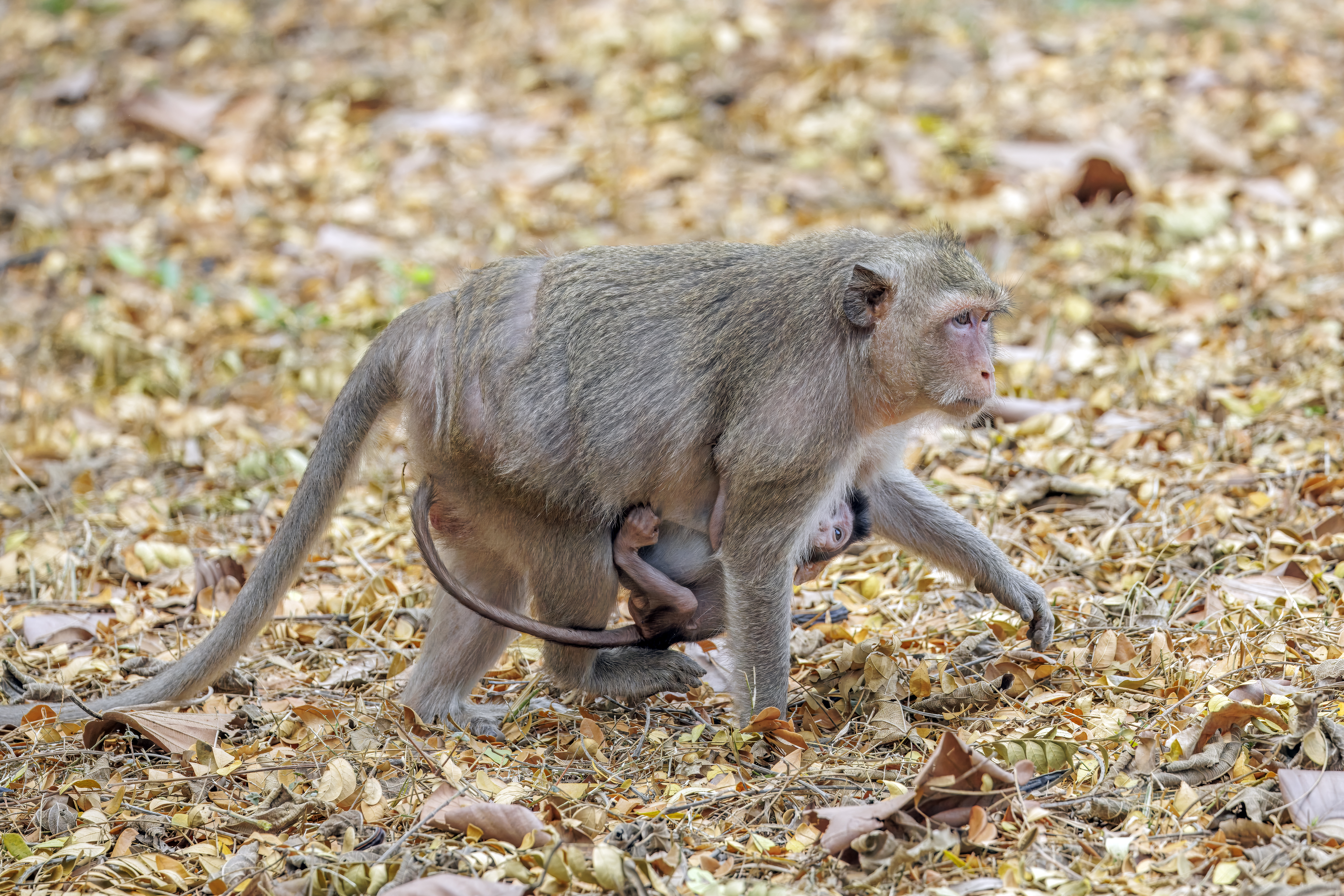
carrying baby

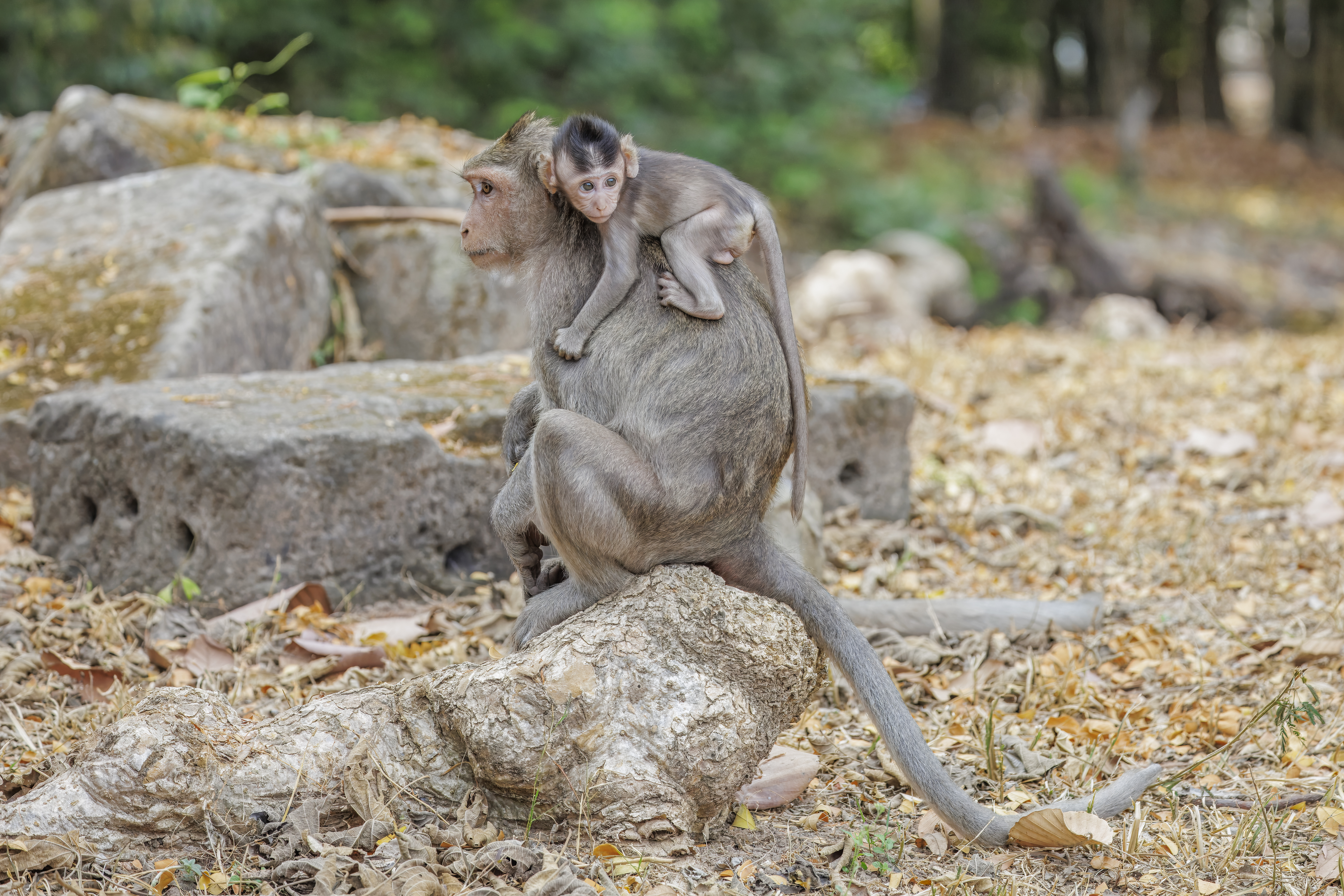
with baby

=== Diet ===
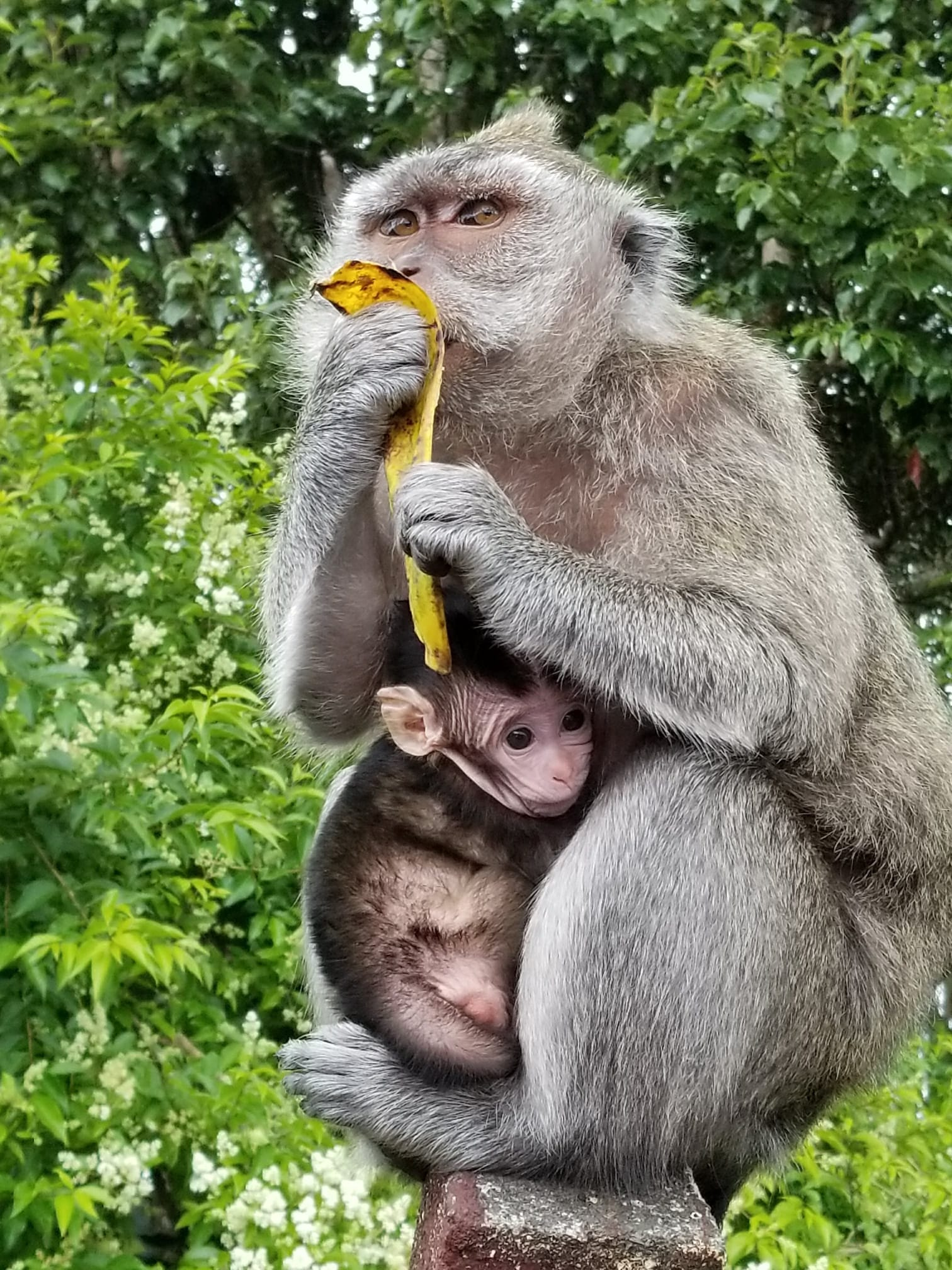
Long-tailed macaque and her young eating a banana in Mauritius

Crab-eating macaques are omnivorous frugivores and eat fruits, leaves, flowers, shoots, roots, invertebrates, and small animals in variable quantities. They eat durians, such as Durio graveolens and D. zibethinus, and are a major seed disperser for the latter species. They exhibit particularly low tolerance for swallowing seeds, and spit seeds out if larger than 3–4 mm (0.12–0.16 in). This decision to spit seeds is thought to be adaptive; it avoids filling the monkey's stomach with wasteful bulky seeds that cannot be used for energy. Fruit makes up 40% to over 80% of the diet of wild crab-eating macaques, except in highly provisioned populations or highly disturbed environments.

Crab-eating macaques can become synanthrope, living off human resources when feeding in cropfields on young dry rice, cassava leaves, rubber fruit, taro plants, coconuts, mangos, and other crops, often causing significant losses to local farmers. In villages, towns, and cities, they frequently take food from garbage cans and refuse piles. In Padangtegal Bali macaque 70% of their diet is provisioned. They become unafraid of humans in these conditions, which can lead to macaques directly taking food from people, both passively and aggressively.

=== Tool use ===
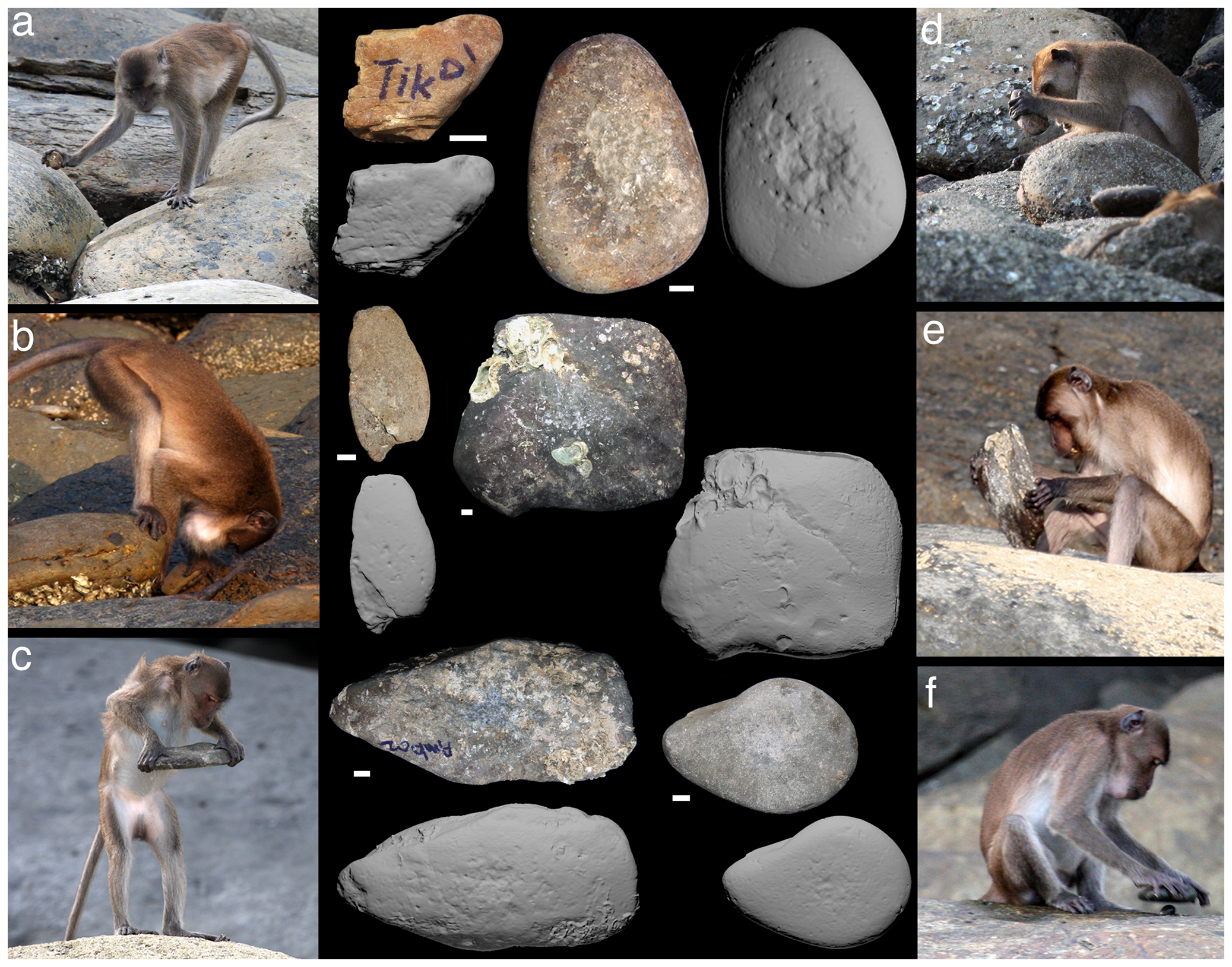
Stone tool usage by crab-eating macaques in Laem Son National Park in Thailand

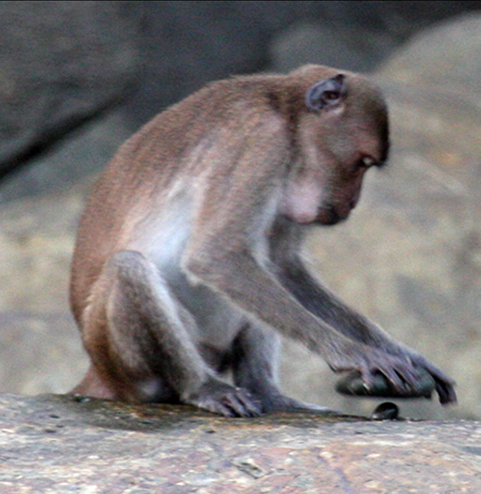
A crab-eating macaque using a stone as tool

The crab-eating macaque is the only old world monkey known to use stone tools in its daily foraging. This has been mainly observed in coastal areas of Thailand and Myanmar. In Thailand, crab-eating macaques use ax-shaped stones to crack rock oysters, detached gastropods, bivalves and swimming crabs; in abandoned plantations, they crack oil palm nuts, which shows their ability to take advantage of anthropogenic changes. Human activities can negatively impact tool-using macaques, thus disrupting the persistence of these stone tool use traditions.

Another instance of tool use is washing and rubbing foods, such as sweet potatoes, cassava roots, and papaya leaves, before consumption. Crab-eating macaques either soak these foods in water or rub them through their hands as if to clean them. They also peel the sweet potatoes, using their incisors and canine teeth. Adolescents appear to acquire these behaviors by observational learning of older individuals.

=== Robbing and bartering ===
Robbing and bartering is a behavioral pattern in which free ranging nonhuman primates spontaneously steal an object from a human and then hold onto that object until that or another human solicits an exchange by offering food. This behavior is seen in crab-eating macaques at Uluwatu population in Bali, and is described as a population specific behavioral practice, prevalent and persistent across generations and characterized by marked intergroup variation. Synchronized expression of robbing and bartering was socially influenced and more specifically explained by response facilitation. This result further supports the cultural nature of robbing and bartering. Token-robbing and token/reward-bartering are cognitively challenging tasks for the Uluwatu macaques that revealed unprecedented economic decision-making processes, i.e., value based token selection and payoff maximization. This spontaneous, population specific, prevalent, cross-generational, learned and socially influenced practice may be the first example of a culturally maintained token economy in free-ranging animals.

== Threats ==
The crab-eating macaque has been categorized as Endangered on the IUCN Red List; it is threatened by habitat loss due to rapid land use changes in the landscapes of Southeast Asia and the surging demand by the medical industry during the COVID-19 pandemic. A 2008 review of population trends suggested a need for better monitoring of populations due to increased wild trade and rising levels of human-macaque conflict, which continue to decrease overall population levels despite the species' wide distribution.

Each subspecies faces differing levels of threats, and too little information is available on some subspecies to assess their conditions. M. f. umbrosa is likely of important biological significance and has been recommended as a candidate for protection in the Nicobar Islands, where its small, native population has been seriously fragmented. It is listed as vulnerable on the IUCN Red List. The Philippine long-tailed macaque (M. f. philippensis) is listed as near threatened, and M. f. condorensis is vulnerable. All other subspecies are listed as data deficient and need further study; although recent work is showing M. f. aurea and M. f. karimondjawae need increased protection.

=== Trade ===
The crab-eating macaque is one of the most widely traded species of mammal listed on the CITES appendices. The international trade in crab-eating macaques is a multibillion-dollar industry. Crab-eating macaques are sold for up to $20,000 to $24,000, and prices rise when supply reduces. International crab-eating macaque trade does not appear to follow a particular trend but continues to change over time. Although peak exports often correlate with declarations of public health emergences.

In the 1970s, India was the largest supplier of macaques, mostly rhesus macaques, but put a ban on export because when it became apparent that monkeys were used to test military weapons. After this ban, crab-eating macaques began to be used more in biomedical research. Imports of crab-eating macaques in the US and elsewhere began to increase during the worldwide reduction and subsequent ban of rhesus macaque exports from India.

In the 1980s, crab-eating macaques were introduced to China and began being bred in captive facilities. Since then, captive macaques have been favored in biomedical trade.

In the 1990s, four major commercial monkey farms operated by Chinese entrepreneurs began exporting wild caught macaques as captive bred, and monkeys smuggled from Laos and Cambodia were likely part of these transactions. By 2001, China was exporting significantly more crab-eating macaques than rhesus macaques. Cambodia grants harvest permits to five monkey farms to breed crab-eating macaques for export. Crab-eating macaque harvesting began to accelerate as farms and holding areas were established near protected areas. At this time, international trade of crab-eating macaques expanded rapidly.

Between 2000 and 2018, the US was the largest importer of crab-eating macaques ranging from 41.7 to 70,1% of imports. other major importers: France up to 17.1%, Great Britain up to 15.9%, Japan up to 37.9%, and China up to 33.5%. During this time, China was the largest exporter of crab-eating macaques. Other exporters include Mauritius, Laos, Cambodia, Thailand, Indonesia, and Vietnam. Between 2008 and 2019, at least 450,000 live crab-eating macaques and over 700,000 specimens were traded, with over 50,000 identified as wild caught.

After 2018, Cambodia became the largest exporter of crab-eating macaques, contributing 59% of all macaques traded in 2019 and 2020. Between 2019 and 2020, Chinese crab-eating macaque trade decreased 96%. China banned animal trade in January 2020 due to concerns of COVID-19, yet this cannot account for the significant decrease in crab-eating macaque exports in 2019, the drivers of this decline are still unclear.

Crab-eating macaques are one of the most commonly internationally traded mammals and are also the most common primates in domestic trade, most often for pets or food. Macaques are regularly sold and kept as pets in China, Vietnam, and Indonesia. In Indonesia pet macaques are usually taken from the wild, which was illegal since 2009, but in 2021 the Indonesian government lifted the harvest ban and reinstated a harvest quota. In Indonesia, crab-eating macaques and pig tailed macaques are the only primates that are not included in the list of protected species. Often infants and juveniles are caught and sold in wildlife markets.

==== Laundering ring ====
In November 2022, following a five-year investigation by the DoJ and US Fish and Wildlife, the DoJ indicted Cambodian government officials and Cambodian owner and staff of Vanny Bio Research Corporation LtD, a macaque breeding center in Cambodia, for their alleged involvement in laundering wild-caught monkeys as captive bred. Charles River Laboratories is also under investigation. Unfortunately, the crab-eating macaques involved in the Cambodian smuggling ring imported by Charles River are in limbo – they are ineligible for research but they cannot go back to the wild either. This laundering is a sophisticated trans-border wildlife trafficking network. Crab-eating macaques are harvested in places like Cambodia, Laos, and Myanmar and then laundered through Vietnam and illegally smuggled to places like China.

== Conservation ==
The crab-eating macaque is listed on CITES Appendix II. Its IUCN Red List status was uplisted in 2020 and again in 2022 from the Least Concern classification in 2008 as a result of declining population resulting from hunting and troublesome interactions with humans, despite its wide range and ability to adapt to different habitats. These interactions include the skyrocketing demand for crab-eating macaques by the medical industry during the COVID-19 pandemic, and the rapid development of the landscape in Southeast Asia. A 2008 review of their populations suggested a need for better monitoring of populations due to increased wild trade and rising levels of human-macaque conflict, which continue to decrease overall population levels despite the species' wide distribution.

The Long-Tailed Macaque Project and The Macaque Coalition are engaged in conservation of the crab-eating macaque through research and public engagement.

== Relationship with humans ==
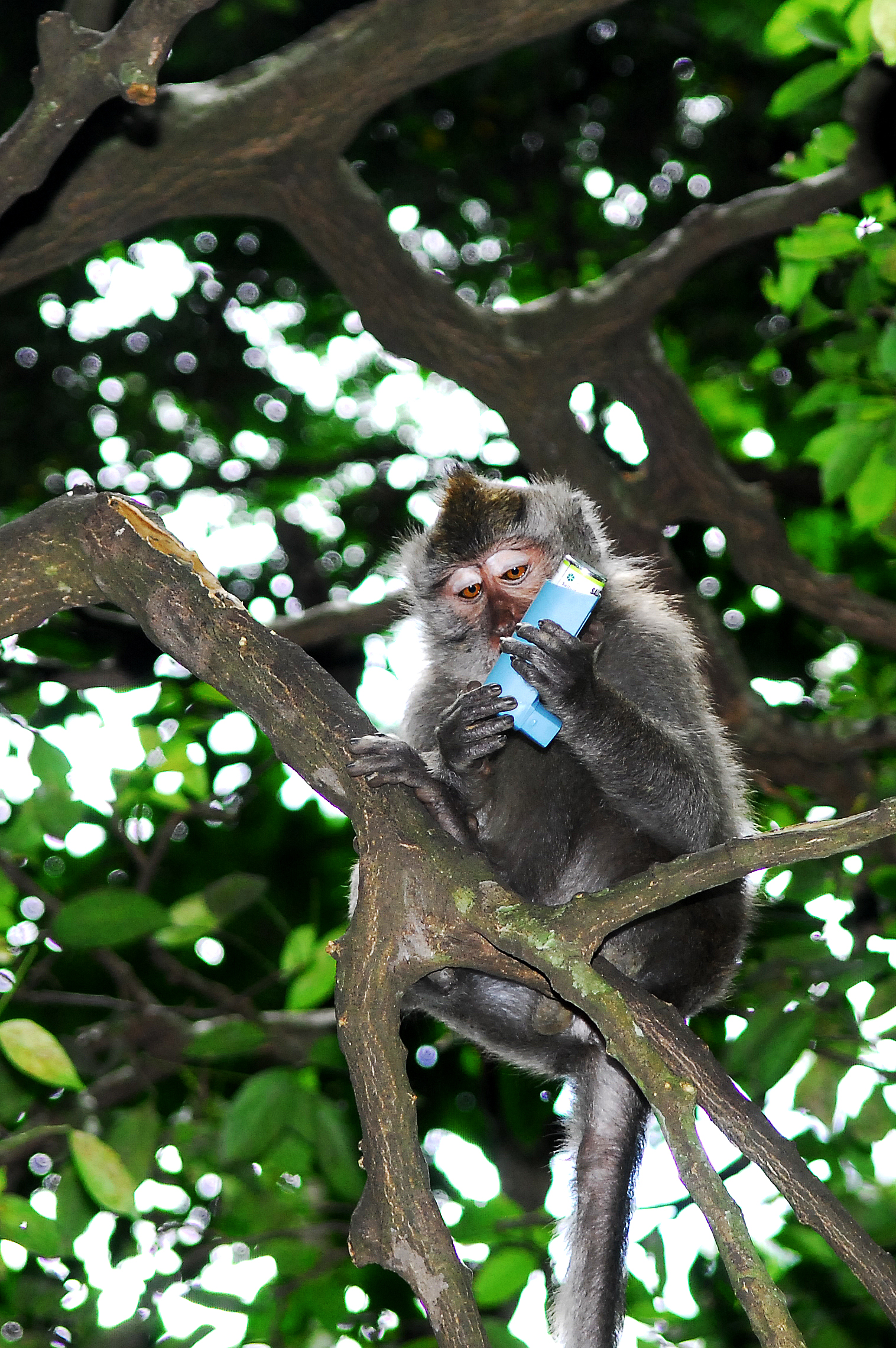
A crab-eating macaque living in a human vicinity, with a stolen asthma inhaler

Crab-eating macaques extensively overlap with humans across their range in Southeast Asia. Consequently, they live together in many locations. Some of these areas are associated with religious sites and local customs, such as the monkey forests and temples of Bali in Indonesia, Thailand, and Cambodia, while other areas are characterized by conflict as a result of habitat loss and competition over food and space. Humans and crab-eating macaques have shared environments since prehistoric times, and both tend to frequent forest and river edge habitats. Crab-eating macaques are occasionally used as a food source for some indigenous forest-dwelling peoples. In Mauritius, they are captured and sold to the pharmaceutical industry, and in Angaur island in Palau, they are sold as pets. Macaques feed on sugarcane and other crops, affecting agriculture and livelihoods, and can be aggressive towards humans. Macaques may carry potentially fatal human diseases, including herpes B virus. In Singapore, they have adapted into the urban environment.

In places like Thailand and Singapore human-macaque conflict task forces have been created to try and resolve some of these conflicts.

=== In scientific research ===
M. fascicularis is also used extensively in medical experiments as a model organism, in particular those connected with neuroscience and disease. Due to their close physiology, they can share infections with humans. Some cases of concern have been an isolated event of Reston ebolavirus found in a captive-bred population shipped to the US from the Philippines, which was later found to be a strain of Ebola that has no known pathological consequences in humans, unlike the African strains. Furthermore, they are a known carrier of monkey B virus (Herpesvirus simiae), a virus which has produced disease in some lab workers working mainly with rhesus macaques (M. mulatta). Plasmodium knowlesi, which causes malaria in M. fascicularis, can also infect humans. A few cases have been documented in humans, but for how long humans have been getting infections of this malarial strain is unknown. It is, therefore, not possible to assess if this is a newly emerging health threat, or if just newly discovered due to improved malarial detection techniques. Given the long history of humans and macaques living together in Southeast Asia, it is likely the latter.

Crab-eating macaques are one of the most popular species used for scientific research. Crab-eating macaques are used primarily by the biotechnology and pharmaceutical industry in the evaluation of pharmacokinetics, pharmacodynamics, efficacy, and safety of new biologics and drugs, they are also used in infectious disease, TB, HIV/AIDS, and neuroscience studies.

The use of crab-eating macaques and other nonhuman primates in experimentation is controversial with critics charging that the experiments are cruel, unnecessary and lead to dubious findings. One of the most well known examples of experiments on crab-eating macaques is the 1981 Silver Spring monkeys case.

In 2014, 21,768 crab-eating macaques were imported in the United States to be used in experimentation.

=== Clones ===
On 24 January 2018, scientists in China reported in the journal Cell the creation of two crab-eating macaque clones, named Zhong Zhong and Hua Hua, using the complex DNA transfer method that produced Dolly the sheep.

=== Abuse scandal ===
In June 2023, BBC exposed a global online network of sadists who shared videos of baby long-tailed macaques being tortured by caretakers in Indonesia. There were many torture methods, from teasing the primates with baby bottles to killing them in blenders, sawing them in half, or cutting off their tails and limbs. Enthusiasts would pay for the caretakers to film videos torturing the macaques. Investigation has led to some prisons and police searches in both Indonesia and the United States, where many of the torture enthusiasts were located.

== See also ==
- Maggie the Macaque
- Prostitution among animals
