= Grahame Bulfield =

English geneticist

- Citizenship: British
- Education: University of Leeds
- Known for: Former Director of the Roslin Institute, Edinburgh
- Awards: CBE, FRSE, HonFRS
- Scientific career
- Fields: Animal Genetics
- Workplaces: University of Edinburgh
- Thesis: Genetical and biochemical studies of fatness in mice
- Doctoral advisor: C.H. Waddington, D.S. Falconer, H. Kacser, G.S. Boyd

Grahame Bulfield, CBE, FRSE, Hon FRASE (born 1941) is an English geneticist, vice-principal and Emeritus Professor of Genetics at the University of Edinburgh. He was the director and chief executive of the Roslin Institute, Edinburgh, when in 1996 the research group led by Ian Wilmut first cloned a mammal from an adult somatic cell, a Finnish Dorset lamb named Dolly.

== Early life and education ==
Grahame Bulfield was born in 1941 in Leeds, was educated in Cheshire, where his interest in agriculture and farming started to grow. In 1959 he enrolled at the University of Leeds, reading for a BSc in Agriculture with Honours in animal production. His curiosity for genetics fully blossomed and he took to completion his honours project on the subject of "Beef Sire Performance and Progeny Test". Upon recommendation by a lecturer, with the support of a scholarship from the Ministry of Agriculture, in 1964 he enlisted the Institute of Animal Genetics in Edinburgh, studying for a Diploma in Animal Genetics. Having gained valuable international experience in Sweden, at the University of Uppsala, as a Travelling Fellow of the Yorkshire Agricultural Society, he registered for a PhD in Genetics at the University of Edinburgh, with a studentship from the Agricultural Research Council. His specific area of interest was the biochemical genetics of two obese mutants in the mouse, and under the supervision of C.H. Waddington, D.S. Falconer, Henrik Kacser and G.S. Boyd, he presented his thesis "Genetical and biochemical studies of fatness in mice". After his PhD and until 1971 he was involved in the Department of Genetics with the University of California, as a Fulbright Fellow.

== Career and research ==
In 1971, once returned to Edinburgh, he worked with Henrik Kacser on two projects funded by the MRC, concerning the screening and analysis of mouse mutants of human inherited disease. In 1976 he was selected as a Lecturer and Medical Convenor of Medical Genetics at the University of Leicester. Here his research extended from mouse disease mutants to the genetic control of gene expression, and the genetics of growth. His studies led him to discover of a mutation on the mouse X-chromosome, responsible to cause the Duchenne and the Becker muscular dystrophy in humans, and thus opening a path to a possible cure. He was appointed head of the Genetics Group at the Poultry Research Centre of Edinburgh in 1981, a part of which merged into the Institute of Animal Physiology and Genetics Research (IAPGR), having its own newly built Edinburgh Research Station in 1986. He was nominated head of the Gene Expression Group, becoming head of the whole station in 1988. Subsequently, this renamed itself Roslin Institute, as an independent body from its sister institute in Cambridge, and Bulfield was elected as its chief executive and director. At Roslin he spearheaded pioneering projects with cutting-edge technology that made selective breeding of livestock animals easier, carrying on a tradition thousands of years old. His research covered the wide spectrum of genetics and molecular biology, analysing genetic similarities that exist between humans and other species. Production of animal feedstuff, cereals, milk, meat, benefited all from the findings of his research. Not only that, but this increased in-depth knowledge in the genetic sciences eased the way to curing and preventing human diseases and to the development of the new industry of bio-farming. In 1996 the cloning of Dolly the sheep at Roslin received wide attention both in the public domain and in the scientific arena, raising questions and debates on the ethical aspects and implications of it. He sustained that science can be used for good or evil, and that his job as a scientist was to put as much information out in the public domain, so that the public and government could judge it. Once Pasteur started to apply science to medicine in 1850, he let the genie out of the bottle. He argued that the knowledge itself must be seen in a social context and that if Roslin had not gone ahead with Dolly, somebody else would have done it anyway. If Dolly represented the living proof that animals could help humanity by producing organs and medicines, many saw her arrival as the prelude to human cloning. However, facing a worldwide diffused moral panic, he argued that he would be absolutely flabbergasted if we saw it happening in his lifetime, and that it was a nonsensical bit of hype. Nevertheless, in 1997, he and his team at Roslin in charge of the Dolly's project, led by Ian Wilmut, had to appear before the House of Commons Select Committee on Science and Technology to answer questions on cloning. As a result, the UK's Ministry of Agriculture cut off funding to the project, just when the team was celebrating the publication of their work in the journal Nature. He was shocked and stated that he would move heaven and Earth to keep resources in that cloning program. Their effort to perfect transgenic animal that could well improve farming conditions was under threat by the effect of cuts, resulting in more redundancies in permanent staff. In response the Institute raised £6M in commercial funding to exploit the cloning technology and established a company Roslin BioMed to take this forward; this was later sold to the Californian Company Geron. When in 2001 Roslin entered a partnership with Viragen (Amex) to exploit the institute's transgenic chicken technology, he stated as its CEO that both he and his colleagues at Roslin believed to have found the ideal partner in Viragen and were looking forward to an extremely productive collaboration. Since then he has served in an advisory capacity to several government and public committees, and as a consultant to a UK biotechnology company.

== Awards ==
In 1990 he was nominated Honorary Professor of the University of Edinburgh, and subsequently to a Personal Chair of Animal Genetics in 2002. He was elected as Fellow of the Royal Society of Edinburgh in 1992. In 1999 he was appointed Honorary Fellow of the Royal Agricultural Society of England. He was awarded a CBE for services to Animal Genetics in 2001. He is currently Emeritus Professor of Genetics at the University of Edinburgh.
