= Anthony John Clark =

English molecular biologist

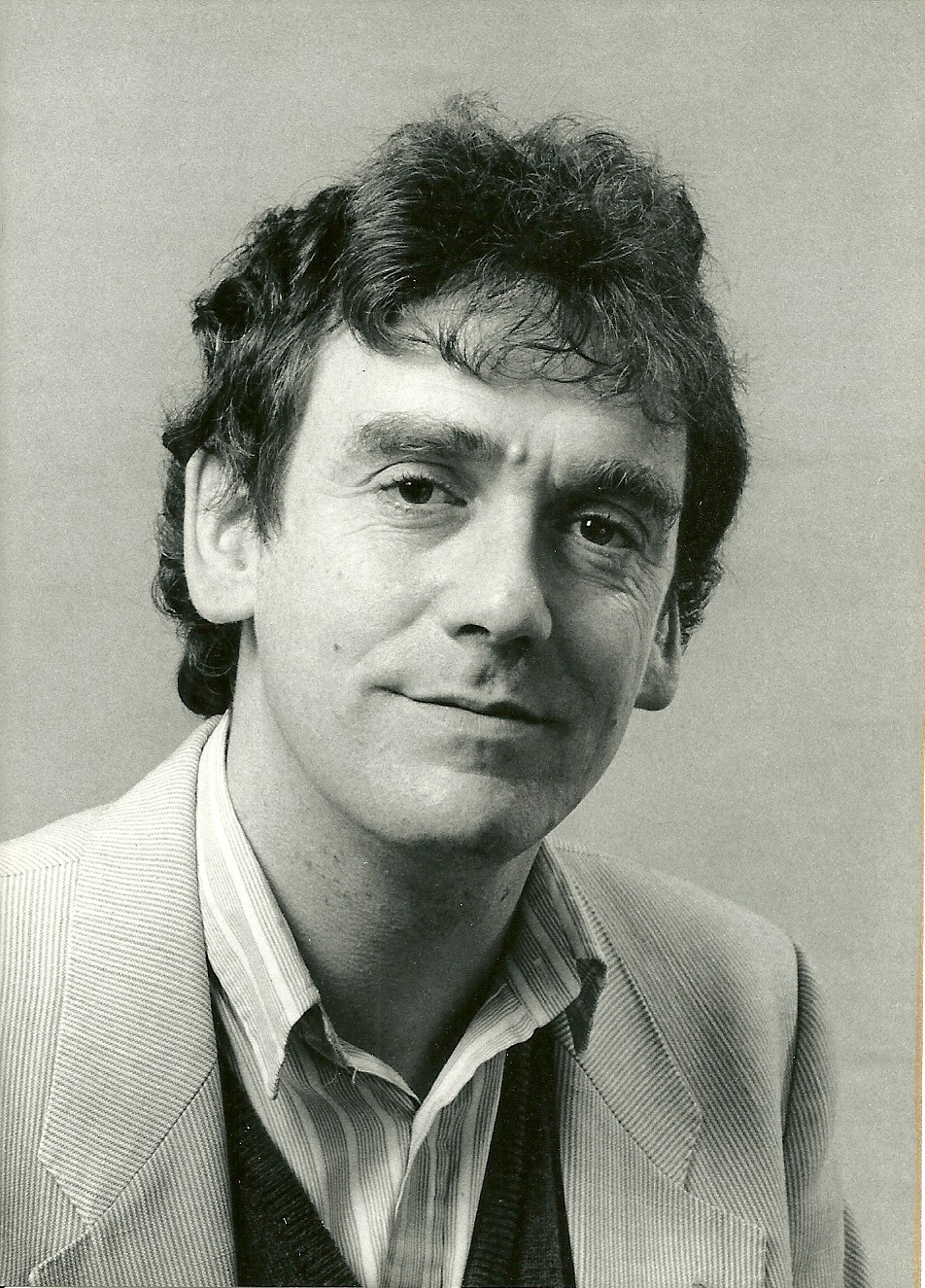
Dr Anthony John Clark

Anthony John Clark OBE FRSE (18 September 1951 – 12 August 2004) was an English molecular biologist who was a founder of applying molecular technology to farm animals. He was director of the Roslin Institute from 2002 to 2004.

== Background ==
Born in Blackpool, Clark's family moved to Lincolnshire and he was educated at Barton Grammar School. He graduated with a degree in natural sciences from Christ's College, Cambridge, a constituent college of the University of Cambridge. He then completed a Masters degree at the University of Western Ontario, with a thesis on the regulation of development in a mudsnail. His PhD on Satellite DNA was conducted at the Medical Research Council (MRC) Unit in Edinburgh.

== Career ==
After achieving his doctorate, Clark joined John Bishop's team at the Institute of Genetics, University of Edinburgh, where he carried out research into the genes in the liver of mice. In 1985 he was appointed to the Animal Breeding Research Organisation (subsequently the Roslin Institute) where he began work in genetic modification to produce a sheep giving milk with human proteins. He was successful within five years. Tracy, born in 1990, was the first sheep to produce large quantities of human protein, making 35g of the alpha-1-antitrypsin (used in treatment of cystic fibrosis) in each litre of her milk. During the 1990s, Clark continued to develop transgenic techniques on large animals. With his colleagues, he produced a sheep from which a prion protein gene had been removed, the first time this had been achieved in a large animal. Clark's work set the stage for Ian Wilmut's team at Roslin to clone a sheep, Dolly (1996), the result of transplanted DNA of an adult sheep to an unfertilized egg cell. He was appointed an OBE in 1997 for his contribution to Science.

== Personal life ==
Clark met Helen Banfield at Cambridge in 1973, when they were both students. They married in 1975 in Canada and moved to Edinburgh in 1977 where he took his doctorate. They had two sons, Charlie (1989), and Laurie (1991). One of his greatest pleasures was spending time with his family on the remote Isle of Colonsay, in the Inner Hebrides. He was respected by colleagues for his leadership, direction and the support he gave them. Clark died at the age of 52, suffering from depression. He was found hanged in his holiday home.
