= Colin Tudge =

British science writer and broadcaster

Plenary speaker at the Oxford Food Symposium

Colin Hiram Tudge (born 22 April 1943) is a British biologist, science writer and broadcaster.

Tudge was born and brought up in south London and attended Dulwich College, from where he won a scholarship to Peterhouse, Cambridge, studying zoology and English. In his career, he has worked for World Medicine, Farmers' Weekly and New Scientist, before becoming a freelance writer. In the 1980s he was a regular broadcaster for the BBC, including the BBC Radio 4 science series Spectrum; he wrote and presented The Food Connection; he made one-off documentaries and guest appearances.

He lives in Oxford with his second wife, Ruth West. He was married to Rosemary (née Shewan) and had three children, Amanda, Amy and Robin, the last being an author of political works.

National Life Stories conducted an oral history interview (C1672/12) with Colin Tudge in 2016 for its Science and Religion collection held by the British Library.

== Works ==
- "The Great Rethink" Pari, Italy. 2021. Pari Publishing.
- Why Genes are Not Selfish and People are Nice: A Challenge to the Dangerous Ideas that Dominate Our Lives. Edinburgh, 2013. Floris Books. ISBN 086315963X. Argues that, contrary to many popular ideas, humans are not selfish but naturally cooperative, and that the universe is more than just 'stuff' for us to use at will.
- Consider the Birds: How They Live and Why They Matter. London, 2008. Penguin. Explores various aspects of the life of birds from their migrations to their complicated family lives, their differing habitats and survival techniques to the secrets of flight, it discusses how birds live, why they matter, and whether they really are dinosaurs.
- Feeding People is Easy. Pari Publishing, Italy. 2007. When agriculture is expressly designed to feed people, all the associated problems seem to solve themselves.
- The Secret Life of Trees. Allen Lane, London, 2005, ISBN 0-7139-9698-6. Penguin Books, London, 2006. Published as The Tree by Crown, New York, 2006. ISBN 1400050367
- So Shall We Reap: the Concept of Enlightened Agriculture. Allen Lane, London 2003; Penguin Books, London, 2004. An alternative title is So Shall We Reap: how everyone who is liable to be born in the next ten thousand years could eat very well indeed; and why, in practice, our immediate descendants are likely to be in serious trouble, on the future of agriculture, in which he challenges the current science and technology paradigm and outlines a sustainable way of feeding the population of the world, expected to stabilise at ten billion people by the middle of the 21st century.
- In Mendel's Footnotes: Genes and Genetics from the 19th century to the 22nd. Jonathan Cape, 2000. Paperback: Vintage, 2002. Published as The Impact of the Gene, Farrar, Straus, and Giroux, New York, 2001. ISBN 0-09-928875-3
- The Variety of Life: A Survey and a Celebration of All the Creatures That Have Ever Lived. Oxford University Press, Oxford and New York, 2000. Paperback, March 2002. An accessible phylogeny of life, explaining in clear terms the descent and interrelationships of most kinds of organism.
- Neanderthals, Bandits and Farmers. Weidenfeld & Nicolson, London, 1998. Yale University Press, New Haven, 1999. ISBN 0-297-84258-7. A small book explaining how agriculture began. The book is one of a series of long essays by respected contemporary Darwinian thinkers, which were published under the collective title Darwinism Today; the series was inspired by a course of 'Darwin Seminars' which took place at the London School of Economics (LSE) in the late 1990s.
- The Day Before Yesterday. Jonathan Cape, London, 1995. Pimlico, London, 1996. Published in the US as The Time Before History: 5 Million Years of Human Impact, Scribner, New York 1996. Touchstone, New York, 1997.
- The Engineer in the Garden: Genes and Genetics from the Idea of Heredity to the Creation of Life. Jonathan Cape, London, 1993, ISBN 0-224-03826-5. Hill & Wang, New York, 1994, ISBN 0809042592. Pimlico (Pbk) 1995
- Last Animals at the Zoo. Hutchinson Radius, London, 1991. Oxford University Press, Oxford, 1992. Island Press, Washington, 1992.
- Global Ecology. Natural History Museum, 1991. Oxford University Press, New York 1991.
- Food Crops for the Future. Basil Blackwell, Oxford, 1988.
- The Food Connection. British Broadcasting Corporation, London, 1985.
- Future Cook. Mitchell Beazley 1980. Published as Future Food, Harmony Books, New York, 1980.
- The Famine Business. Faber and Faber, London 1977. St Martin's Press, New York, 1977. Penguin Books (Pelican), Middlesex, 1979.

Co-authorships

- The Second Creation: Dolly and the Age of Biological Control. (co-authored with Ian Wilmut and Keith Campbell). Headline, London, 2000. Farrar, Straus and Giroux, New York, 2000.
- Home Farm. (co-authored with Michael Allaby). Macmillan, London, 1977. Sphere Books, London, 1979.
