= Helen Clark (disambiguation) =

Helen Clark (born 1950) is a former Prime Minister of New Zealand.

Helen Clark is also the name of:

- Helen Bright Clark (1840–1927), British feminist
- Helen Elizabeth Shearburn Clark, expert on echinoderms
- Helen Taggart Clark (1849–?), American journalist and poet
- Helen Clark (British politician) (born 1954), Member of Parliament
- Helen Clark (oral historian) (1952–2015), oral history pioneer in Scotland
- Helen Clark (singer) (fl. 1910s–1920s), American singer

== See also ==
- Helen Clarke (disambiguation)
