= Roger Burton Land =

British animal geneticist

Roger Burton Land FRSE (30 April 1940 – 17 April 1988) was a 20th century British animal geneticist. As head of the Edinburgh Research Station he was one of the several scientists responsible for laying the groundwork for the creation of Dolly the Sheep. The Roger Land Building within the University of Edinburgh's King's Buildings complex is named after him.

== Life ==
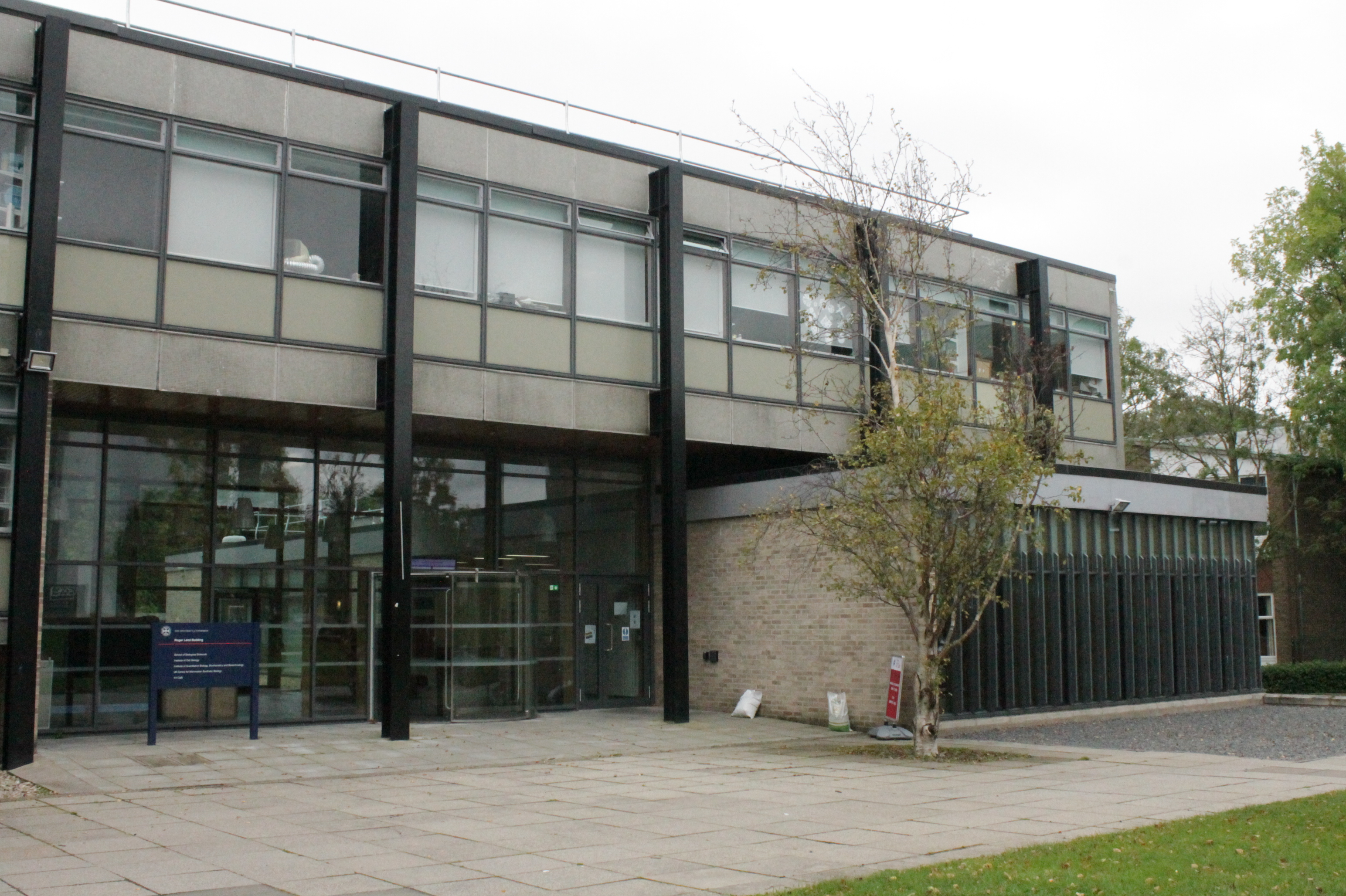
The Roger Land Building, King's Buildings

He was born in Shipley, West Riding of Yorkshire, on 30 April 1940, the son of Betty Newton Burton and her husband Albert Land. He was educated at Bradford Grammar School, going on to study science at the University of Nottingham. Deciding to specialise in animal genetics in 1962, he did postgraduate studies at the University of Edinburgh gaining a diploma in animal genetics and a doctorate PhD presenting the thesis "A genetic study of fertility in the mouse". In 1966 he joined the Animal Breeding Research Organisation (ABRO). He rose to be director in 1983. On its reorganisation in 1986, he was appointed the head of the Edinburgh Station of the Institute of Animal Physiology and Genetic Research (IAPGR), which replaced ABRO.

In 1985 he was elected a fellow of the Royal Society of Edinburgh. His proposers were William G. Hill, Noel Farnie Robertson, Douglas Scott Falconer, Alan Robertson, Gerald Wiener and Anne McLaren.

He died suddenly at his home in West Linton on 17 April 1988, aged 47.

== Family ==
In 1968 he married Moira Mackay and together they had three children.

== Publications ==
- Genetic Study of Fertility in the Mouse (1965)
