= Tracy (sheep) =

Transgenically modified sheep

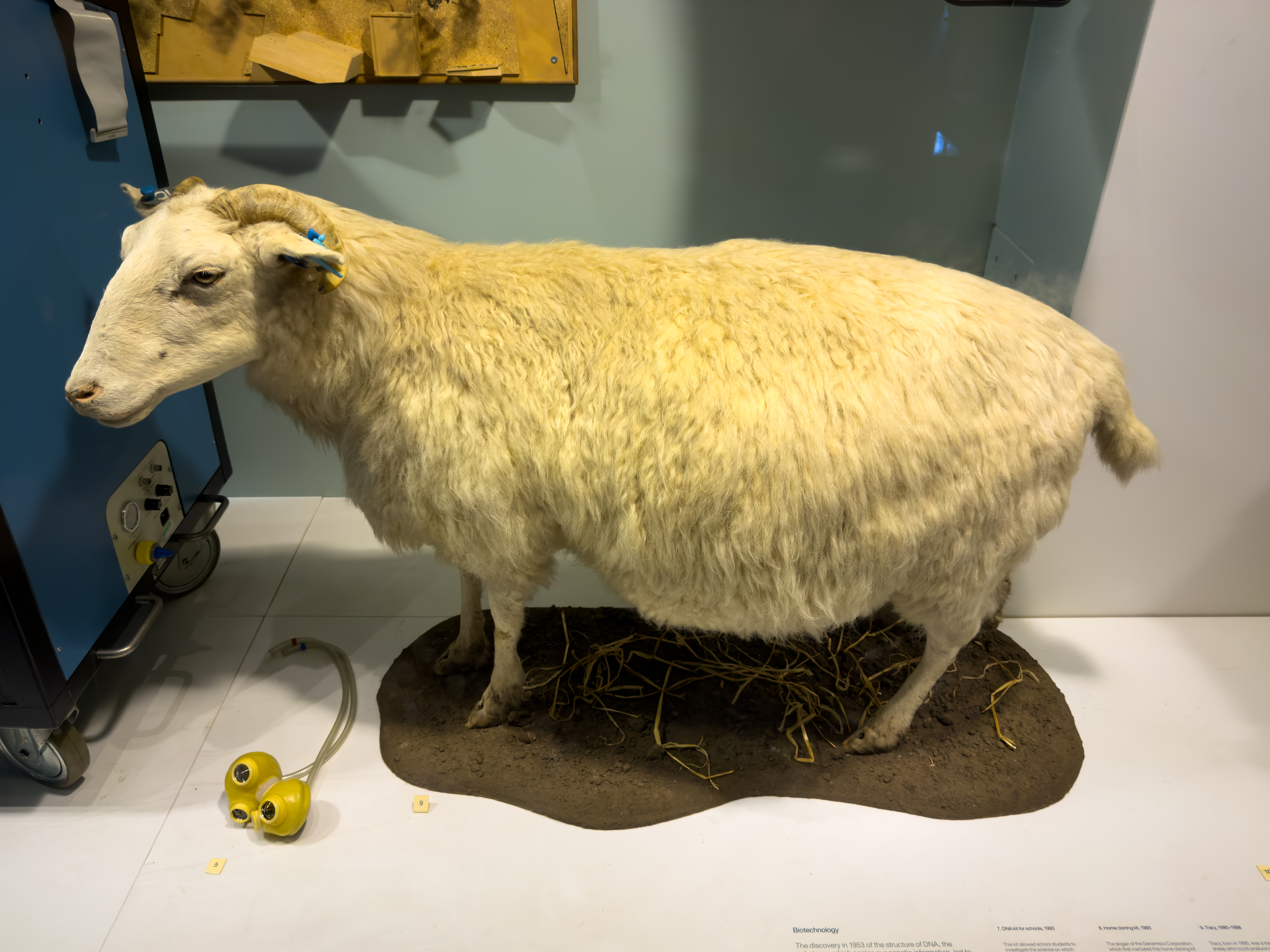
Tracy on display at the Science Museum, London in 2025

Tracy (1990 – 1997) was a transgenically modified sheep created by scientists at Scotland's Roslin Institute to produce the human protein alpha 1-antitrypsin, a substance regarded in the 1990s as a potential pharmaceutical for the treatments of cystic fibrosis and emphysema. Notably, she is the first transgenic farm mammal ever created.

Alpha 1-antitrypsin comprised 50% of the total protein in Tracy's milk, a remarkably high level maintained after lactation. Similar levels were detected in the milk produced by her granddaughters. A deficiency in this protein in humans can produce lung diseases, and its artificial creation was thought to be a potential success in the diseases' treatment. Clinical trials for the engineered protein in 1998 revealed that it developed breathing problems in patients, and research for the milk as a remedy for the diseases has not continued since then.

== See also ==
- Dolly (sheep)
- Pharming (genetics)
- Genetically modified organisms
