= Eleanor Riley =

Scottish academic

Eleanor Mary Riley CBE FRSE FMedSci was Director of the Roslin Institute, Dean of Research at the Royal (Dick) School of Veterinary Studies, and professor of Immunology at the University of Edinburgh. Her research focusses on understanding the immune response of the host to malaria and other diseases using human data and mouse models.

== Education ==
Riley gained her bachelor's degree in cell biology and veterinary science from the University of Bristol, before reading for a postgraduate diploma in veterinary disease from Cornell University and studying her PhD in immunology and parasitology at the University of Liverpool. Her thesis entitled 'The immunology of experimental Echinoccus granulosus [sic] infection in mice' was accepted in 1985.

== Career ==
Riley worked for five years at the MRC Unit The Gambia. Riley joined the University of Edinburgh initially as a research fellow in 1990, before moving to the London School of Hygiene & Tropical Medicine (LSHTM) in 1998 as a professor of infectious disease and immunology. She was promoted in 2001 to head of the immunology and infectious disease department, a post she held until 2013. She was elected a fellow of the Academy of Medical Sciences in 2014. Riley was appointed director of the Roslin Institute in September 2017, one month before the Roslin was awarded a Gold Athena SWAN for outstanding commitments to gender equality in the workplace. She was invited to give the 2018 International Day of Women and Girls in Science Lecture at the University of St Andrews. In 2019 Riley became the first woman to be awarded the Ronald Ross Medal by LSHTM, stating that:

Professor Riley is a world leader in malaria immunology, with a unique background in basic sciences, veterinary medicine, human infectious diseases and global health, and has made major contributions to strengthening research capacity in Africa

—

In February 2020 Riley resigned from her post as director of the Roslin Institute following alleged bullying by senior members of the college. She was elected a Fellow of the Royal Society of Edinburgh in 2021.

Riley was appointed Commander of the Order of the British Empire (CBE) in the 2023 Birthday Honours for services to immunology.
