= Jean Manson =

Professor of Biomedical and Cognitive Sciences

- Born: Jean Catherine Manson
- Education: University of Edinburgh University of St Andrews
- Awards: OBE FRSE
- Scientific career
- Fields: Neuroscience Neurobiology Biology Prion Disease

Jean Catherine Manson OBE FRSE is a British neurobiologist who works on prion diseases in humans and animals and more recently expanded into working on dementias like Alzheimer's disease at the University of Edinburgh, Scotland.

== Personal life ==
Manson is a member of the Edinburgh Photographic Society.

== Career ==
Manson is the former Head of the Neuropathogenesis Unit at the Roslin Institute at the University of Edinburgh.

Manson is currently the Principal Investigator at EPAD Bioresource at the University of Edinburgh, working within the Centre for Dementia Prevention also at the University of Edinburgh.

Manson has also sat on advisory boards for government and scientific advisory committees and currently sits on the steering group for the Medical Research Council (MRC) Dementias Platform.

== Awards and honours ==
Manson was awarded the Order of the British Empire (OBE) in the New Year Honours in 2008.

In 2009, Manson was elected a Fellow of the Royal Society of Edinburgh.
