= Helen Clarke =

Helen Clarke may refer to:

- Helen Clarke (field hockey) (born 1971), New Zealand field hockey player
- Helen A. Clarke (1860–1926), American literary critic and editor
- Helen P. Clarke (1846–1923), American actress and bureaucrat

== See also ==
- Helen Clark (disambiguation)
