= I'm Forever Blowing Bubbles =

1919 popular song

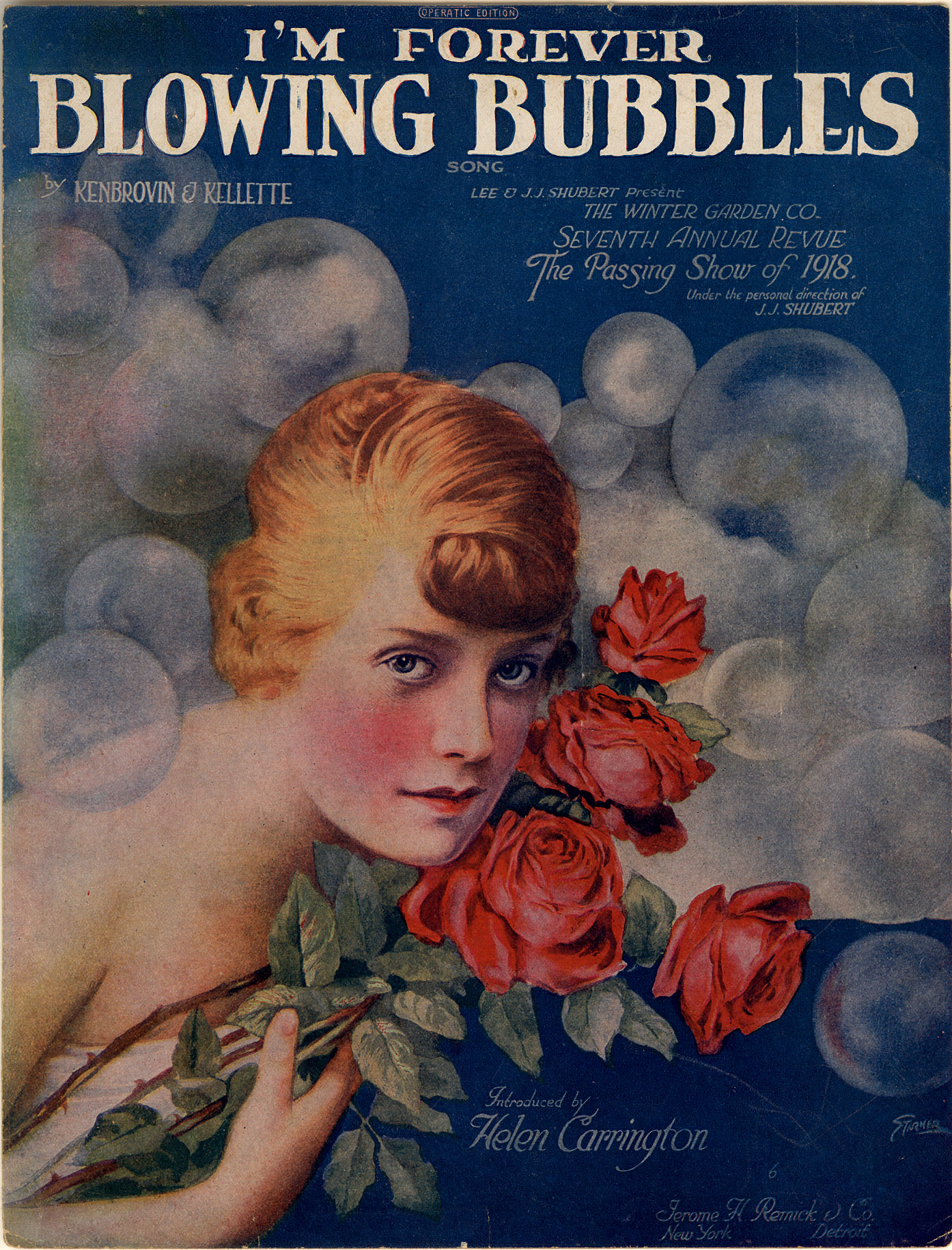
- Sheet music cover, 1919

Song by Selvin's Novelty Orchestra
- Published: January 4, 1919 Kendis, Brockman Music Co., New York, Jerome H. Remick & Co.
- Released: October 1919
- Recorded: July 31, 1919, take 7
- Studio: Victor Studios, New York City
- Genre: Jazz, big band
- Length: 3:35
- Label: Victor 18603
- Composer: John William Kellette
- Lyricists: Jaan Kenbrovin (alias for James Kendis, James Brockman, Nat Vincent)

Audio sample
- "I'm Forever Blowing Bubbles", performed by Selvin's Novelty Orchestra, as an instrumental waltz (1919): file; help

"I'm Forever Blowing Bubbles" is a popular American song written in 1918, released in late 1919, becoming a success for Ben Selvin's Novelty Orchestra. It has been revived and adapted over the years since then, serving as the anthem of the British EFL Championship club West Ham United.

== Origins ==
The music was composed by John Kellette in 1918. The lyrics are credited to "Jaan Kenbrovin"—actually a collective pseudonym for the writers James Kendis, James Brockman and Nat Vincent, combining the first three letters of each lyricist's last name. The number debuted in the Broadway musical, The Passing Show of 1918, and it was introduced by Helen Carrington.

The copyright to "I'm Forever Blowing Bubbles" was registered in 1919 by the Kendis-Brockman Music Co. Inc. It was transferred later that year to Jerome H. Remick & Co. of New York and Detroit. James Kendis, James Brockman, and Nat Vincent all had separate contracts with their own publishers, leading them to use the name Jaan Kenbrovin for credit on this song. James Kendis and James Brockman were partners in the Kendis-Brockman Music Company.

== Reception ==
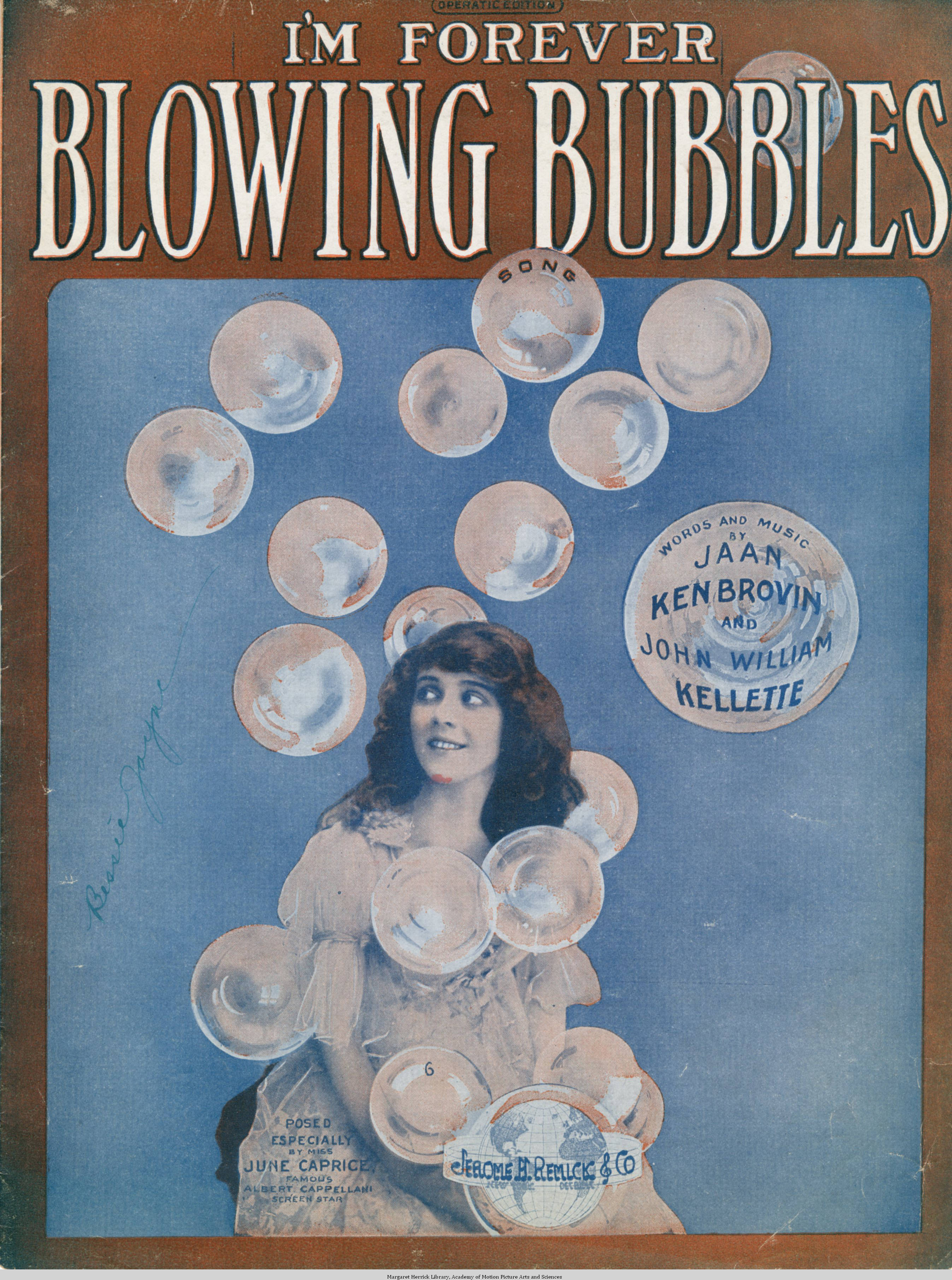
Sheet music cover featuring June Caprice

The waltz was a major Tin Pan Alley hit, and was performed and recorded by several singers and bands in late 1919 and 1920. Ben Selvin's Novelty Orchestra had a success with it late in 1919. The Original Dixieland Jass Band recording of the number is an unusual early example of jazz in 3/4 time.

The writer Ring Lardner parodied the lyric during the Black Sox scandal of 1919, when he began to suspect that players on the Chicago White Sox (a United States–based baseball team) were deliberately losing the World Series to the Cincinnati Reds. His version began: "I'm forever blowing ballgames".

The song also became a hit with the public in British music halls and theatres during the early 1920s. Dorothy Ward was especially renowned for making the song famous with her appearances at these venues. The song was also used by English comedian "Professor" Jimmy Edwards as his signature tune, played on the trombone. Harpo Marx would play the song on clarinet, which would then begin emitting bubbles. The melody is quoted in the 1920s song "Singing in the Bathtub", and has frequently been used in animated cartoon sound tracks during bubble-related scenes; it is also repeatedly sung by Tweety Bird.

The song features extensively in the 1931 prohibition gangster movie The Public Enemy, starring James Cagney. It also was sung by a white bird in the Merrie Melodies cartoon I Love to Singa. The song is also sung in the 1951 film On Moonlight Bay, starring Doris Day and Gordon MacRae, which was the prequel to the 1953 film By the Light of the Silvery Moon. A parody of the song was written and performed as "I'm Forever Blowing Bubble-Gum" by Spike Jones and his City Slickers. In Ken Russell's 1969 film Women in Love the song is featured in an unusual scene where two sisters, played by Glenda Jackson and Jennie Linden, wander away from a large picnic gathering and are confronted by a herd of cattle. In the early 1970s, the Bonzo Dog Doo-Dah Band's stage show featured a robot that sang the air while blowing bubbles. A solo guitar rendition is periodically featured within the action of Woody Allen's 1999 film Sweet and Lowdown. Director Brad Mays paid homage to that scene in his 2008 film The Watermelon, in which actress Kiersten Morgan sings the song while dancing on a Malibu beach. Several different covers of the song (including an original arrangement performed by Engelbert Humperdinck) are also featured in Bullet Train.

== Lyrics ==
The original lyrics (as per the first publication)

=== Verse 1 ===
I'm dreaming dreams,
I'm scheming schemes,
I'm building castles high.
They're born anew,
Their days are few,
Just like a sweet butterfly.
And as the daylight is dawning,
They come again in the morning.

=== Chorus ===
I'm forever blowing bubbles,
Pretty bubbles in the air.
They fly so high,
Nearly reach the sky,
Then like my dreams,
They fade and die.
Fortune's always hiding,
I've looked everywhere,
I'm forever blowing bubbles,
Pretty bubbles in the air.

=== Verse 2 ===
When shadows creep,
When I'm asleep,
To lands of hope I stray.
Then at daybreak
When you awake,
Your bluebird flutters away.
Happiness new seemed so near me,
Happiness come forth and heal me.

=== Themes ===
Bubbles, and the idiom castles in the sky (or air), are symbols of creative aspiration and also of the fragility of these hopes and dreams. Bluebirds and the break of day are emblems of hope and renewal, the sky is another symbol of hope, while butterflies are commonly used to represent represent ephemerality. In "forever blowing bubbles", the singer patiently endures life's setbacks, stubbornly keeping faith with a resiliently positive approach to life.

== West Ham United connection ==
The song is well known in England as the club anthem of West Ham United, a London-based football club. It is said to have been adopted by West Ham's supporters in the 1920s (although there is no record of West Ham fans singing the song until 1940), and it is now one of the most recognisable club anthems in British football, alongside songs similarly adopted by other clubs, such as "You'll Never Walk Alone", "Keep Right On To The End Of The Road", "Blue Moon", "Blaydon Races", "Delilah", "Sunshine on Leith", and "Goodnight, Irene".

"I'm Forever Blowing Bubbles" was played in various football grounds by marching bands in the 1920s, for example at Swansea and West Ham's rival Millwall. The song was introduced to West Ham by former manager Charlie Paynter in the late 1920s. A player, Billy J. "Bubbles" Murray, who played for the local Park School had a resemblance to the boy in the "Bubbles" painting by Millais used in a Pears soap commercial of the time. Headmaster Cornelius Beal began singing the tune "I'm Forever Blowing Bubbles" with amended lyrics when Park players played well. Beal was a friend of Paynter, while Murray was a West Ham trialist and played football at schoolboy level with a number of West Ham players such as Jim Barrett. Because Billy J. Murray had officially joined West Ham's youth team, the club's fans took it upon themselves to begin singing the popular music hall tune before home games, sometimes reinforced by the presence of a house band requested to play the refrain by Paynter. West Ham United supporters sing the chorus (rarely the verses), followed by "United!, United!" - part of the club's name and an expression of communal solidarity.

In 1980, as a tribute to West Ham United, the punk rock band the Cockney Rejects covered the song. The song is also heard in the movie Green Street Hooligans and at the end of episode 6 of series 3 of Ashes to Ashes, which took place in 1983 and featured the death of a West Ham United supporter.

In 2006, at the final match at Arsenal F.C.'s Highbury stadium, Arsenal supporters broke into song to celebrate West Ham's defeat of Tottenham which secured Arsenal's spot in the Champions League on the last day. Similarly, Blackburn Rovers were heard singing "Bubbles" in their dressing room after West Ham assisted them winning the Premier League in 1995 having held Manchester United to a 1–1 draw on the final day of the season, led by Tony Gale (an eleven-year West Ham veteran who had moved to Blackburn earlier in the season).

On 16 May 1999, prior to a home game against Middlesbrough, 23,680 fans in the Boleyn Ground blew bubbles for a minute, setting a new world record.

On 27 July 2012, during the Olympics Opening Ceremony, "I'm Forever Blowing Bubbles" was used as part of the soundtrack to the event at the London Olympic Stadium.

On 1 September 2018, to mark the centennial of the song's original debut, Alex Mendham & His Orchestra performed a special arrangement of "I'm Forever Blowing Bubbles" at the London Stadium.

== Shriners International connection ==
In North America, the song played a part in the foundation of the Shriners Children, which are owned and operated by Shriners International, a Freemasonry-related organisation.

At their 1920 Imperial Session (national convention), Freeland Kendrick proposed a unified charitable mission for the Shriners fraternity by building an orthopedic hospital for children. The idea had come to him after visiting the Texas Scottish Rite Hospital for Children, which primarily treated children suffering the devastating effects of polio. He was shocked to learn that there were not enough hospitals specialising in care for children, especially those suffering from polio.

When he made the proposal, many expressed doubts; with the prospects of the plan being approved fading fast, Forrest Adair then spoke: "I was lying in bed yesterday morning, about four o'clock, and some poor fellow who had strayed from the rest of the band stood down there under the window for 25 minutes playing "I'm Forever Blowing Bubbles"." Adair said that when he awoke later that morning he thought again of the wandering musician. “I wondered if there were not a deep significance in the tune that he was playing for Shriners… I'm Forever Blowing Bubbles." Adair continued, “While we have spent money for songs and for bands, it is time for the Shriners to spend money for humanity. ... Let us get rid of all the technical objections. And if there is a Shriner in North America who objects to having paid the two dollars after he has seen the first crippled child helped, I will give him a check back for it myself." Adair sat down to the sound of thunderous applause. In that moment, the tide had turned; the resolution was passed unanimously.

A committee chosen to determine the site and personnel for the Shriners Hospital concluded that there should not be just one hospital, but a network of hospitals throughout North America. When the committee brought the proposal to the 1921 Imperial Session in Des Moines, Iowa, it too was passed.

== Sparta Warriors connection ==
In Norway, the song is known as the club anthem of Sparta Warriors, a Sarpsborg-based ice hockey club.

The Norwegian version of the song, rewritten and performed by Kai Robert Johansen, is titled "Blå Bobler" (Blue Bubbles).

== Recordings ==
Recordings of the song include:

- Albert C. Campbell & Henry Burr
  - Columbia A-2701 (matrix: 78263–1)
  - Recorded January 22, 1919
- Helen Clark & George Wilton Ballard
  - Edison Blue Amberol 3798
  - Released August 1919
- Ben Selvin & his Novelty Orchestra
  - Victor 18603 (matrix: 22966–6)
  - Recorded July 31, 1919
- Peter Dawson (as Will Strong)
  - His Master's Voice B 1092
  - Recorded in London February 16, 1920
- Vera Lynn
  - Recorded in London, for the album Vera Lynn Sings Songs of the Twenties
- Doris Day & Jack Smith with the Norman Luboff Choir with orchestra directed by Paul Weston
  - Columbia 39453 (matrix: RHCO 4481-1N)
  - Also released as a track of on 10" LP On Moonlight Bay
  - Recorded Los Angeles April 27, 1951
- Les Paul & Mary Ford
  - Capitol UK
  - CL. 13583
  - Recorded Sep 1951
- Les Brown and his Band of Renown
  - Vogue Coral Q 72242
  - Recorded April 1957
- Kirby Stone Four
  - Philips PB 938
  - Recorded 1959
- The Blue Diamonds
  - Decca F 21346
  - Recorded 1961
- The Kalin Twins
  - Brunswick 05862
  - Recorded 1961
- Frank Fontaine (as Crazy Guggenheim on The Jackie Gleason Show/CBS-TV; Songs I Sing on the Jackie Gleason Show – Track 2)
  - ABC Paramount Records 90212
  - Recorded 1962
  - Number one album on Billboard in February 1963
- The Kaye Sisters
  - Philips 326569 BF
  - Recorded 1963
- West Ham United Cup Squad
  - Pye 7N 45470
  - Released May 1975
- Grandma's Boys
  - [SPEBSQUA: Barbershop Harmony Music]
  - Recorded 1979
- Cockney Rejects
  - Zonophone Z 4
  - Released May 1980
- Joan Morris and William Bolcom
  - Moonlight Bay: Songs As Is and Songs As Was
  - Albany Troy 318
  - Released 1999
- Charlie Ventura – Bop for the People (vocal by Jackie Cain and Roy Kral)
  - Proper Box UK
  - Released September 2005
- Dean Martin
  - Sung on the Dean Martin Show
  - Appears on the album Sittin' on Top of the World
  - Released 1973

A version of the tune can be heard in the animated film The Thief and the Cobbler by Richard Williams.

At least four different versions are heard in the 2022 film Bullet Train; the version on the film's soundtrack was recorded by Engelbert Humperdinck.

== Singles chart success ==
"I'm Forever Blowing Bubbles"

Single by Cockney Rejects
- B-side: "West Side Boys"
- Released: 1980
- Genre: Punk
- Length: 3:32
- Label: EMI Records (UK)
- Songwriters: John Kellette, James Kendis, James Brockman, Nat Vincent
- Producer: Chris Briggs

Cockney Rejects singles chronology
"The Greatest Cockney Rip Off" (1980)	"I'm Forever Blowing Bubbles" (1980)	"We Can Do Anything" (1980)

Versions of the song have charted in the UK Singles Chart on two occasions, both coinciding with an FA Cup Final appearance by West Ham United. On 10 May 1975 a version recorded by the West Ham 1975 FA Cup Final squad entered the chart at number 31, only staying in the top 40 for one week. For the 1980 FA Cup Final appearance the Cockney Rejects version of the song entered the charts at number 35 on 31 May 1980, again only staying in the top 40 for the one week.
