= Christopher Polge =

English biologist (1926–2006)

- Born: 16 August 1926
- Died: 17 August 2006 (aged 80)
- Education: University of Reading
- Known for: Cryopreservation
- Awards: Wolf Prize in Agriculture (1988); Japan Prize (1992)
- Scientific career
- Fields: Cryobiology
- Workplaces: National Institute for Medical Research, Animal Research Station at Cambridge
- Doctoral students: Ian Wilmut

Ernest John Christopher Polge CBE FRS (16 August 1926 – 17 August 2006) was an English biologist, most noted for his work in cryopreservation.

The son of a Buckinghamshire farmer, he was educated at Bootham School in York, before going to the University of Reading where he studied Agriculture, graduating with an Ordinary degree. He worked briefly as an agricultural economist before joining the Division of Experimental Biology at the National Institute for Medical Research at Mill Hill, London, and later the Animal Research Station at Cambridge, where he worked under Sir John Hammond.

It was while a doctoral student that he solved the long-standing problem of how to preserve living cells and tissues at very low temperatures. In 1950, Polge produced the first chicks from eggs fertilised with frozen sperm, the first vertebrates to be produced in this way. Two years later, Polge reported high pregnancy rates in cattle using sperm that had been frozen for periods in excess of a year, work which had far-reaching consequences for the future of artificial insemination and genetic improvement in livestock.

After the Animal Research Station closed in 1986, Polge co-founded Animal Biotechnology Cambridge Ltd., where he was also Scientific Director, to translate basic and applied research into commercial agricultural processes and products. He was also a Fellow of Wolfson College from 1984 to 1993 (Emeritus Fellow after)

Polge was elected to the Royal Society in 1983, won the 1988 Wolf Foundation Prize in Agriculture, and was made a Commander of the Order of the British Empire in 1992. He was elected to the US National Academy of Sciences as a foreign associate in 1997.
