= Helen Clark (oral historian) =

British historian

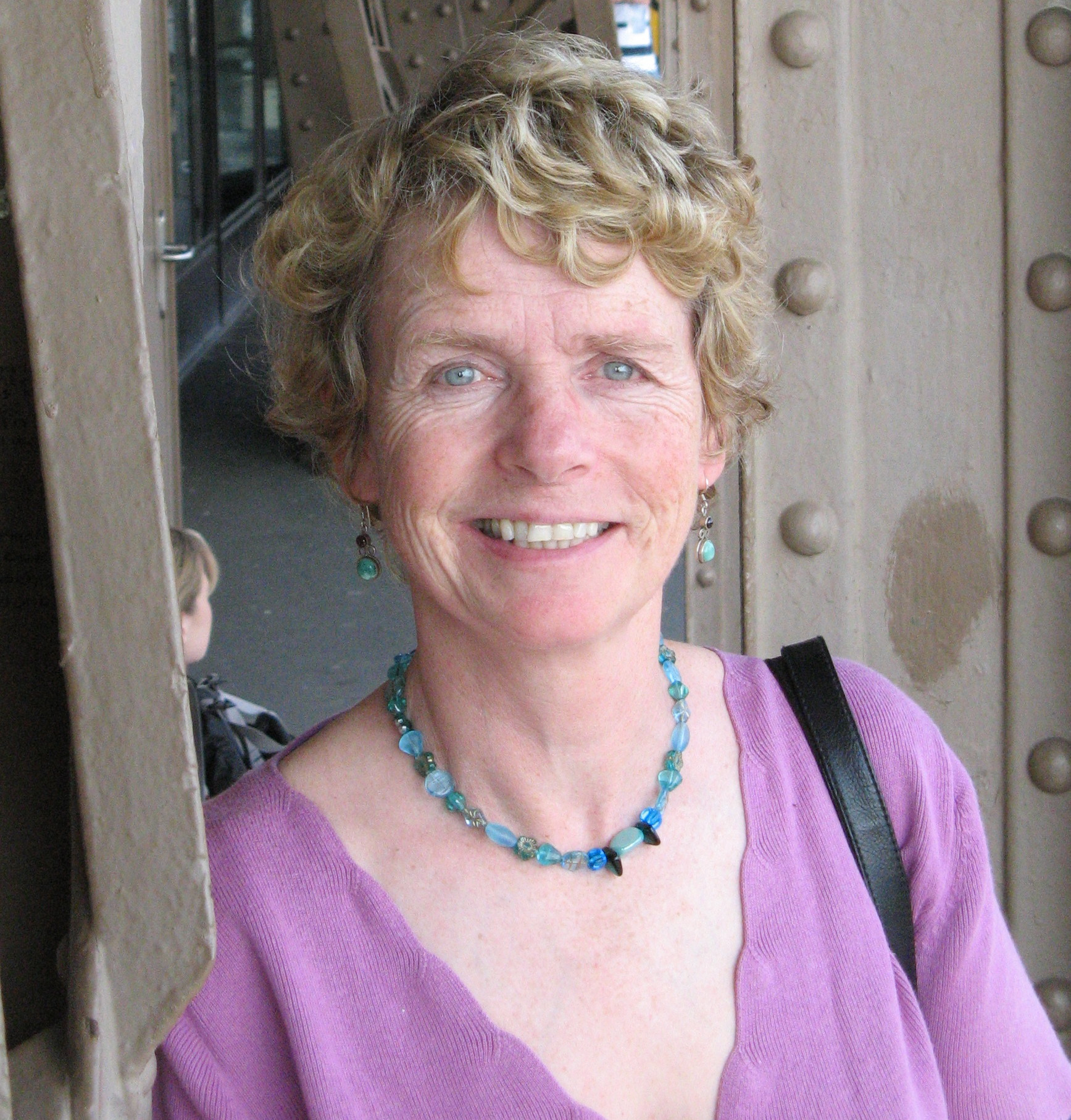
Portrait of Helen Clark

Helen Clark (8 August 1952 – 14 August 2015) was one of the pioneers of Oral History in Scotland.

== Biography ==
Helen Clark was born in Lewisham Hospital, London to parents Sheila, a teacher, and Geoffrey Banfield, a manager with Esso Petroleum. She studied Education and History at Cambridge University and in 1973, during her third year there, she met her future husband, Anthony John Clark, a scientist from Lincolnshire, who later became director of the Roslin Institute and was awarded an OBE. With John she had two children Charlie (born 1989) and Laurie (born 1991). After John's death in 2004 she married Jim Kendall in 2011. Helen died on 14 August 2015 after a two-year illness with Motor Neurone Disease. She created a blog to chart her progress and share its effects with others.

== Career ==
Helen moved to Edinburgh in 1977 where she volunteered at the National Museum before getting her first job as an Art Assistant at the Royal Scottish Museum, now the National Museum of Scotland. In 1982, she became Assistant Keeper of Social History at Beamish North of England Open Air Museum in County Durham, where she first began getting involved in recording oral history.

Helen returned to Edinburgh to become the Keeper of Social History at Edinburgh City Museums from 1985 to 2005; then Special Projects Manager until her retirement in 2012. She shared the task of setting up a new social history museum, the People's Story Museum, which opened in 1989 and "explores the lives of Edinburgh's ordinary people at work and play from the late 18th century to today", using oral testimony and first hand experience.

== Projects and interests ==
In 2009 Helen prepared the Votes for Women exhibition at the Museum of Edinburgh as part of Gude Cause. In the same year she became a member of the Gude Cause New Media Group (renamed Gude Cause Project) to develop links to a digital record of films, recordings and photographs made of activities organised nationally, leading up to the Gude Cause procession in Edinburgh.

In 2014 Helen was interviewed for the WEA Scotland Breaking the Mould project which was researching material for a publication relating to women and women's groups, with connections to Edinburgh, involved in Social and Political Activism in the 100 years after the beginning of WWI. The publication, Breaking the Mould: Edinburgh, includes a tribute to Helen who died just as it was going to the printers.

For many years Helen was a member of the DRBs Scottish Women's History Group and of Protest in Harmony, an Edinburgh-based radical singing group.

== Publications ==
The opening of the People's Story Museum coincided with the publication of Helen's first book, Sing a Rebel Song: The Story of James Connolly. Her second book, Raise the Banners High, was published in 1999 and illustrates and examines the wide range of Trade Union banners held by Edinburgh Museums. These banners and flags were carried by Edinburgh workers as symbols of their causes whether in celebration or to campaign against a working practice or injustice. Her third book, written with Elizabeth Carnegie, She Was Aye Workin' – Memories of Tenement Women in Edinburgh and Glasgow, published in 2002 used oral history sources to give "a vivid picture of tough, resilient women, and communities".
