= Neanderthals, Bandits and Farmers =

1998 book by Colin Tudge

- First edition
- Author: Colin Tudge
- Language: English
- Publisher: Weidenfeld & Nicolson
- Publication date: 1998
- ISBN: 0-297-84258-7
- OCLC: 40511277

Neanderthals, Bandits and Farmers: How Agriculture Really Began is a book on prehistoric agriculture and anthropology by the British science writer Colin Tudge.

The book is one of a series of long essays by respected contemporary Darwinian thinkers, which were published under the collective title Darwinism Today. The series was inspired by a course of 'Darwin Seminars' which took place at the London School of Economics−LSE in London in the late 1990s.

In Neanderthals, Bandits and Farmers, Tudge offers an explanation for the beginning of the population explosion and that farming was not suddenly invented 10,000 years ago, but had existed as what he called proto-farming or hobby farming for at least 30,000 years earlier. What happened 10,000 years ago in the Fertile Crescent was the raising of sea level at the end of the last ice age over a relatively short period of time. This forced a population who were primarily hunter-gatherers to leave a rich prey region and to move inland. The new area was less able to support these immigrants as hunter-gatherers, and they were forced to increase their labors to extend their use of farming in order to maintain their population.

Tudge explains what happened next:

"Hunter gatherers take from their environment only what their environment happens to produce; and if they take too much, the desirable prey species collapse. [...] But the whole point of agriculture is to manipulate the environment so as to increase the amount of food that it will provide. [...] And if you increase the food supply, you can increase your own population. But then, of course, the farmers find themselves in a vicious spiral. The more they farm, the more their population rises and the more they are obliged to farm, because only by farming can they feed the extra mouths."
