= Helen Clark (singer) =

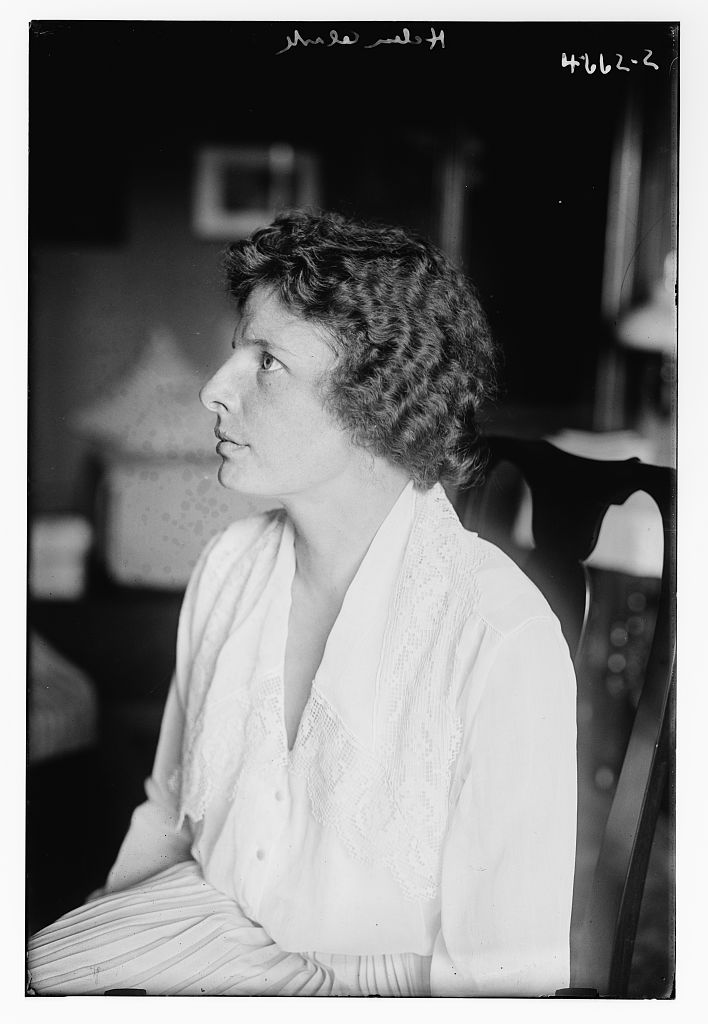

Background information
- Occupation: Singer
- Years active: 1910-1930
- Labels: Victor, Columbia, Edison, Berliner

Helen Clark was an American contralto and soprano singer, known for her recordings of popular songs such as "I'm Forever Blowing Bubbles."

== Early life ==
Clark was born in Rochester, New York. She began singing in church choirs at the age of nine. She moved to New York City at seventeen and studied under Madame Jaeger of the Metropolitan Opera House. She had several small parts in operas at that time.

== Career ==
Clark began her career in 1910, recording with Zonophone and moved to the Victor label where she mostly recorded through 1930. Clark had an early success on Victor with "My Trundle Bed." She was also an early recording artist on the Edison label, being recorded on both cylinders and discs. She would perform live accompanying her own recorded voice on a New Edison phonograph as a promotion for the device.

Clark charted four times as a singer.

- "When I Waltz with You" hit #5 (1913)
- "Pack Up Your Troubles in Your Old Kit Bag and Smile, Smile, Smile" hit #8 (1917)
- "One for All and All for One" hit #7 (1918)
- "I'm Forever Blowing Bubbles," a duet with George Wilton Ballard hit #10 (1919)

Clark was notable for her pairings with many male baritones singing romantic duets in the late 1910's. She recorded duets with baritone Joseph Phillips on the OKeh label and Walter VanBrunt and Henry Burr on Victor. She also sang duets with Bruce Wallace, Lewis James, Charles Hart and Roy Roberts in the 1920s. She had a lull in recordings and then in 1924 made what Record Research called "a spectacular comeback" recording with Elliot Shaw and Lewis James and again becoming a leading popular recording artist. Her solo career was mainly wrapped up by the late 1920s and she sang mainly in group and orchestral arrangements after that.

Clark also recorded under the names Grace Woods, Emma Johnson, May Meredith, Rose Collins, Sallie Collins, and Jane Collins, and possibly under the name Ruth Lenox. She was a prolific artist, listed on nearly 500 recordings, her career spanning the time period between acoustic and electronic recordings. She was a member of the Victor Light Opera Company, the Trinity Choir, and the Royal Stenographers Orchestra where she was a soloist. Her voice was said to be "admirably suited to radio broadcasting."

Little is known about her personal life. She was said to have married twice, the first time to "a son of C.B. Haynes" and the second time to Evan Cameron.
