= Keith Campbell (biologist) =

British biologist and university professor (1954–2012)

- Born: Keith Henry Stockman Campbell; 23 May 1954; Birmingham, England
- Died: 5 October 2012 (aged 58); Ingleby, Derbyshire, England
- Education: Queen Elizabeth College, BSc (now part of King's College London); University of Sussex, PhD
- Known for: Dolly (sheep) (1996)
- Awards: Shaw Prize (2008); IETS Pioneer Award (2015)
- Scientific career
- Workplaces: University of London; University of Sussex; Roslin Institute; University of Nottingham
- Thesis: Aspects of cell cycle regulation in yeast and Xenopus (1988)

Keith Henry Stockman Campbell (23 May 1954 – 5 October 2012) was a British biologist who was a member of the team at Roslin Institute that in 1996 first cloned a mammal, a Finnish Dorset lamb named Dolly, from fully differentiated adult mammary cells. He was Professor of Animal Development at the University of Nottingham. In 2008, he received the Shaw Prize for Medicine and Life Sciences jointly with Ian Wilmut and Shinya Yamanaka for "their works on the cell differentiation in mammals".

== Education ==
Campbell was born in Birmingham, England, to an English mother and Scottish father. He started his education in Perth, Scotland, but, when he was eight years old, his family returned to Birmingham, where he attended King Edward VI Camp Hill School for Boys. He obtained his Bachelor of Science degree in microbiology from the Queen Elizabeth College, University of London (now part of King's College London). In 1983 Campbell was awarded the Marie Curie Research Scholarship, which led to postgraduate studies and later his PhD from the University of Sussex (Brighton, England, UK).

== Research and career ==
Campbell's interest in cloning mammals was inspired by work done by Karl Illmensee and John Gurdon. Working at the Roslin Institute since 1991, Campbell became involved with the cloning efforts led by Ian Wilmut. In July 1995 Keith Campbell and Bill Ritchie succeeded in producing a pair of lambs, Megan and Morag from embryonic cells, which had differentiated in culture.

In 1996, a team led by Ian Wilmut with Keith Campbell as the main contributor, used the same technique and shocked the world by successfully cloning a sheep from adult mammary cells. Dolly, a Finn Dorset sheep named after the singer Dolly Parton, was born in 1996 and lived to be six years old (dying from a viral infection and not old age, as has been suggested). Campbell had a key role in the creation of Dolly, as he had the crucial idea of co-ordinating the stages of the "cell cycle" of the donor somatic cells and the recipient eggs and using diploid quiescent or "G0" arrested somatic cells as nuclear donors. In 2006, Ian Wilmut admitted that Campbell deserved "66 per cent" of the credit.

In 1997, Ritchie and Campbell in collaboration with PPL (Pharmaceutical Proteins Limited) created another sheep named "Polly", created from genetically altered skin cells containing a human gene. In 2000, after joining PPL Ltd, Campbell and his PPL team (based in North America) were successful in producing the world's first piglets by Somatic-cell nuclear transfer (SCNT), the so-called cloning technique. Furthermore, the PPL teams based in Roslin, Scotland and Blacksburg (USA) used the technique to produce the first gene targeted domestic animals as well as a range of animals producing human therapeutic proteins in their milk.

From November 1999, Campbell held the post of Professor of Animal Development, Division of Animal Physiology, School of Biosciences at the University of Nottingham where he continued to study embryo growth and differentiation. He supported the use of SCNT for the production of personalised stem cell therapies and for the study of human diseases and the use of cybrid embryo production to overcome the lack of human eggs available for research. Stem cells can be isolated from embryonic, fetal and adult derived material and more recently by overexpression of certain genes for the production of "induced pluripotent cells". Campbell believed all potential stem cell populations should be used for both basic and applied research which may provide basic scientific knowledge and lead to the development of cell therapies.

== Awards and honours ==
In 2008, he received the Shaw Prize for Medicine and Life Sciences jointly with Ian Wilmut and Shinya Yamanaka. He was awarded the Pioneer Award from the International Embryo Transfer Society posthumously in 2015.

== Personal life ==
Campbell died on 5 October 2012, aged 58, after accidentally hanging himself in his bedroom at his Ingleby, Derbyshire home, whilst heavily intoxicated. It was determined at the inquest that he had been behaving erratically at the time and had no actual intention to kill himself; the verdict was a death by misadventure. He was buried at Bretby Crematorium, Derbyshire. He is survived by his wife, Kathy, and two daughters, Claire and Lauren.
