= George Wilton Ballard =

George Wilton Ballard (November 24, 1877 – April 6, 1950) was an American tenor and pioneer recording artist who was prolific between 1912 and 1926.

== Biography ==
George Wilton Ballard was born in Syracuse New York on November 24, 1877. His father's name was Alfred Ballard, his middle name "Wilton" was his mother's maiden name.

His musical career began as a church soloist in Syracuse. He moved to New York City where he had a professional career as a concert singer, mostly in churches. He was also the primary soloist of Calvary Methodist-Episcopal Church in New York City. While in New York City he continued his vocal studies under Oscar Saenger. While in New York he had an active recording career for fifteen years.

He returned to Syracuse circa 1935 and spent the rest of his life as a jewelry store salesman. He died while at work on April 6, 1950, of a heart attack related to arteriosclerotic heart disease.

Ballard was married to Della Ready Ballard, with whom he had a son. His favorite hobby was bass fishing.

== Recordings ==
Ballard's first recordings were made for U.S. Everlasting Records, for which he produced both two and four-minute cylinders from 1911 to 1913, including duets with William H. Thompson. After Everlasting shut down, he began to record extensively for Edison. His first Edison record appeared February 1914, and from 1915 to 1925 was one of Edison's most prolific artists. Aside from his numerous solo recordings for Edison, he was part of the Harmony Four with John Young, Gladys Rice and Donald Chalmers. When Billy Murray was unavailable for an Edison session he recorded occasionally with the Premier Quartet. and also was sometime part of Edison's Metropolitan Quartet. Ballard's final appearance for Edison was released February 1926, where he sang the vocal chorus on a dance side by Ernie Golden and His Hotel McAlpin Orchestra.

In January 1913, Ballard appeared along with comedians Arthur Housman and Edward Boulden, actor Leo Parmet, bandleader Eugene Jaudas, and fellow recording artists Owen J. McCormack and H. Lane Wilson in the Kinetophone short The Edison Minstrels in which he sings a brief solo of “Silver Threads Among the Gold”. The film was released on February 17, 1913, and was one of only eight surviving Kinetophone sound films in which both the film and the sound recording survive. The Edison Kinetophone system, while practical mechanically, was not successful in theaters because the volume could not be amplified sufficiently for large audiences. In 2018, the antique recordings were digitally remastered and synchronized, resulting in a DVD release of the Edison talkies, The Kinetophone! A Fact! A Reality!

He also made records for Victor Talking Machine Company between 1911 and 1915, Zonophone Records in 1911, three sides for Columbia Records between August 1914 to March 1915, cylinders for the Indestructible Record Company circa 1917–1918. He recorded for Gennett Records and Federal/Silvertone in the early 1920s.

Joel Whitburn estimates that, had the chart been in existence, Ballard would have had three entries in Billboard's charts: "You're More Than the World to Me" released on Victor 17654 (January 1915); "M-O-T-H-E-R (A Word That Means the World to Me)" released on Edison Disc Record 50325 (March 1916); and "I'm Forever Blowing Bubbles", a duet with Helen Clark released on Edison Blue Amberol 3798 (September 1919).

== Style ==
Ballard's style was straight popular songs and the sentimental songs of his era, he eschewed comedy songs. His specialty was romantic love songs. His voice was described as "high, clear and sweet."
