= Ian Wilmut =

British embryologist (1944–2023)

Professor Sir Ian Wilmut OBE FRS FMedSci FRSE
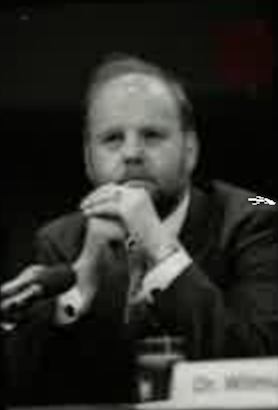
- Wilmut in 1997
- Born: 7 July 1944; Hampton Lucy, Warwickshire, England
- Died: 10 September 2023 (aged 79)
- Education: University of Nottingham (BSc); Darwin College, Cambridge (PhD)
- Known for: Cloning Dolly the sheep
- Awards: OBE (1999); Ernst Schering Prize (2002); Paul Ehrlich and Ludwig Darmstaedter Prize (2005); Shaw Prize in Life science and medicine (2008); Knight Bachelor (2008)
- Scientific career
- Fields: Embryologist
- Workplaces: Roslin Institute; University of Edinburgh
- Thesis: The preservation of boar semen (1971)
- Doctoral advisor: Christopher Polge
- Website: crm.ed.ac.uk/research/group/redirecting-cell-fate

Sir Ian Wilmut (7 July 1944 – 10 September 2023) was an English embryologist and the chair of the Scottish Centre for Regenerative Medicine at the University of Edinburgh. He was the leader of the research group that in 1996 first cloned a mammal from an adult somatic cell, a Finnish Dorset lamb named Dolly.

Wilmut was appointed OBE in 1999 for services to embryo development and knighted in the 2008 New Year Honours. He, Keith Campbell and Shinya Yamanaka jointly received the 2008 Shaw Prize for Medicine and Life Sciences for their work on cell differentiation in mammals.

== Early life and education ==
Wilmut was born in Hampton Lucy, Warwickshire, England, on 7 July 1944. Wilmut's father, Leonard Wilmut, was a mathematics teacher who suffered from diabetes for fifty years, which eventually caused him to become blind. The younger Wilmut attended the Boys' High School in Scarborough, where his father taught. His early desire was to embark on a naval career, but he was unable to do so due to his colour blindness. As a schoolboy, Wilmut worked as a farm hand on weekends, which inspired him to study Agriculture at the University of Nottingham.

In 1966, Wilmut spent eight weeks working in the laboratory of Christopher Polge, who is credited with developing the technique of cryopreservation in 1949. The following year Wilmut joined Polge's laboratory to undertake a Doctor of Philosophy degree at the University of Cambridge, from where he graduated in 1971 with a thesis on semen cryopreservation. During this time he was a postgraduate student at Darwin College.

== Career and research ==
After completing his PhD, he was involved in research focusing on gametes and embryogenesis, including working at the Roslin Institute.

Wilmut was the leader of the research group that in 1996 first cloned a mammal, a lamb named Dolly. She died of a respiratory disease in 2003. In 2008 Wilmut announced that he would abandon the technique of somatic cell nuclear transfer by which Dolly was created in favour of an alternative technique developed by Shinya Yamanaka. This method has been used in mice to derive pluripotent stem cells from differentiated adult skin cells, thus circumventing the need to generate embryonic stem cells. Wilmut believed that this method holds greater potential for the treatment of degenerative conditions such as Parkinson's disease and to treat stroke and heart attack patients.

Dolly was a bonus, sometimes when scientists work hard, they also get lucky, and that's what happened.

— Ian Wilmut, quoted in Time

Wilmut led the team that created Dolly, but in 2006 admitted his colleague Keith Campbell deserved "66 per cent" of the invention that made Dolly's birth possible, and that the statement "I did not create Dolly" was accurate. His supervisory role is consistent with the post of principal investigator held by Wilmut at the time of Dolly's creation.

Wilmut was an Emeritus Professor at the Scottish Centre for Regenerative Medicine at the University of Edinburgh and in 2008 was knighted in the New Year Honours for services to science.

Wilmut and Campbell, in conjunction with Colin Tudge, published The Second Creation in 2000. In 2006 Wilmut's book After Dolly: The Uses and Misuses of Human Cloning was published, co-authored with Roger Highfield.

== Death ==
Wilmut died from complications of Parkinson's disease on 10 September 2023, aged 79.

== Awards and honours ==
In 1998 he received the Lord Lloyd of Kilgerran Award and the Golden Plate Award of the American Academy of Achievement.

Wilmut was appointed Officer of the Order of the British Empire (OBE) in the 1999 Birthday Honours "for services to Embryo Development" and a Fellow of the Royal Society (FRS) in 2002. He was also an elected Fellow of the Academy of Medical Sciences in 1999 and Fellow of the Royal Society of Edinburgh in 2000. He was elected an EMBO Member in 2003. In the same year, he was awarded the Ernst Schering Prize.

In 1997 Wilmut was Time magazine man of the year runner up. He was knighted in the 2008 New Year Honours for services to science.

== Publications ==
- Wilmut, Ian; Campbell, Keith; Tudge, Colin (2000). The Second Creation: The Age of Biological Control by the Scientists Who Cloned Dolly. London: Headline. ISBN 0747221359.
- Wilmut, Ian; Highfield, Roger (2006). After Dolly: The Uses and Misuses of Human Cloning. Norton. ISBN 0393060667.
