= Finn Dorset =

Breed of sheep

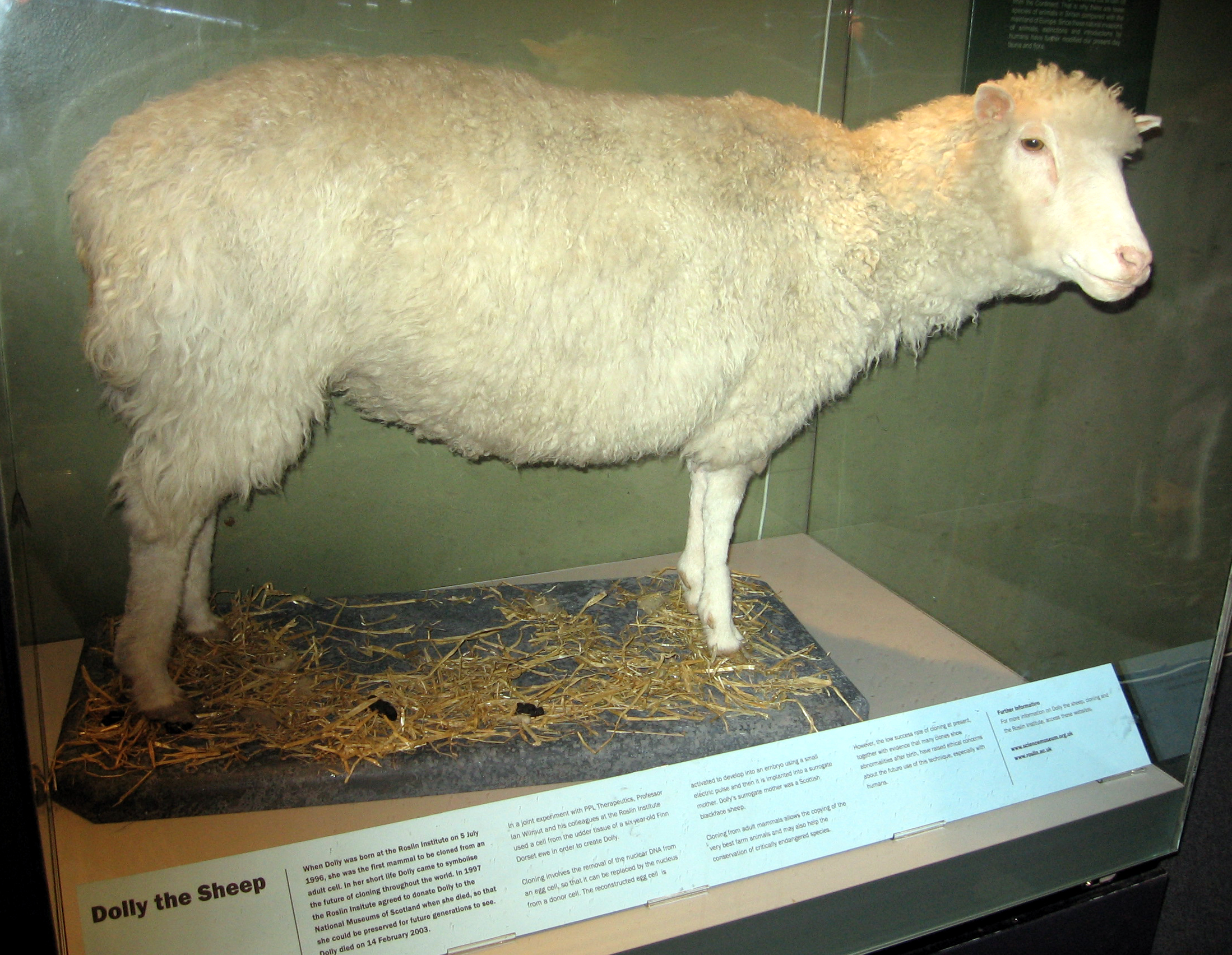
Dolly in the Royal Museum of Scotland

The Finn-Dorset or Finn Dorset is a British and Irish sheep, a cross-breed of the Finnsheep with the Dorset Horn. Finn Dorsets and related cross-breeds have been bred for the properties of the Finnsheep's prolificacy and the Dorset's meat conformation.

Dolly the sheep, first mammal to be cloned from an adult somatic cell, was a Finn Dorset.
