= Roslin Institute =

Scottish animal sciences research institute

The Roslin Institute
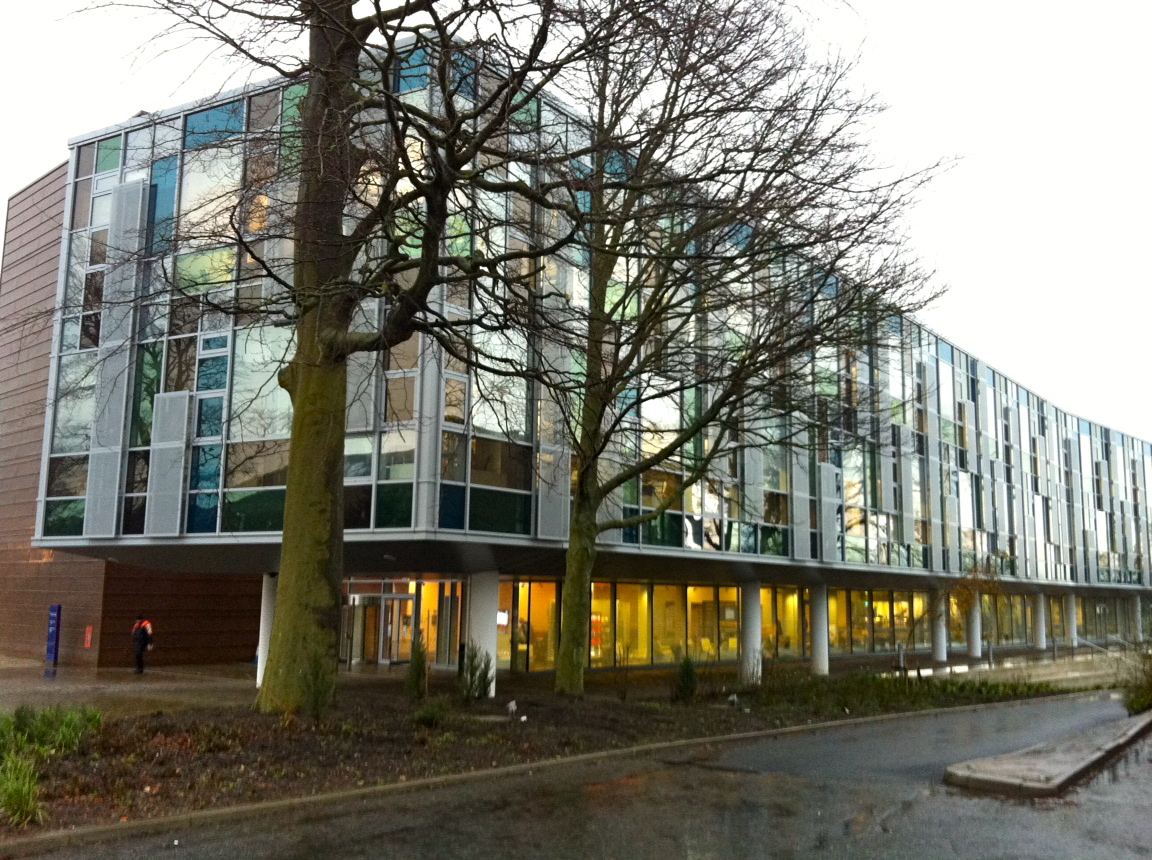
- Established: 1993
- Affiliations: University of Edinburgh, BBSRC
- Director: Professor Bruce Whitelaw
- Location: Midlothian, EH25 9RG, Scotland, UK; 55°51′56″N 03°11′54″W
- Campus: Easter Bush
- Mascot: Dolly the Sheep
- Website: www.ed.ac.uk/roslin

The Roslin Institute is an animal sciences research institute at Easter Bush, Midlothian, Scotland, part of the University of Edinburgh, and is funded by the Biotechnology and Biological Sciences Research Council.

It is best known for creating Dolly the sheep in 1996, the first mammal to be successfully cloned from an adult cell.

== History ==
=== Institute of Animal Genetics (1917–1980) ===
The Roslin Institute has its roots in the University of Edinburgh's Institute of Animal Genetics (IAG), which was founded in 1917 under the direction of Francis Albert Eley Crew.

=== Poultry Research Centre (1947–1986) ===
The Poultry Research Centre (PRC) was founded in 1947 by the Agricultural Research Council (ARC). The new institute used expertise and material from the IAG, and its laboratories were located adjacent to the IAG's building on the university's King's Buildings campus. A second site housing larger experiments was located on the Bush Estate, south of Edinburgh.

In 1971, the institute's experimental facility moved from the Bush Estate to a larger site near the village of Roslin, and the main laboratories moved to the same site in 1980.

=== Animal Breeding Research Organisation (1947–1986) ===
The Animal Breeding Research Organisation (ABRO) was founded at the same time as the PRC in 1947, again using the IAG's expertise. Its research focused mainly on genetic improvement of cattle, pigs and sheep.

In the 1980s, under the direction of John King and Roger Land, ABRO's research began a shift towards molecular biology, which was key in laying the groundwork for the institute's work on cloning in the 1990s.

=== Edinburgh Research Station, Institute of Animal Physiology and Genetics Research (1986–1993) ===
In 1986, the Poultry Research Centre and the Animal Breeding Research Organisation merged with the Institute of Animal Physiology, based in Babraham, Cambridgeshire, to form the Institute of Animal Physiology and Genetics Research (IAPGR). The PRC's buildings in Roslin became the IAPGR's Edinburgh Research Station, with the former ABRO facilities progressively relocating there between 1986 and 1989.

=== The Roslin Institute (1993–2008) ===
The IAPGR's sites at Babraham and Roslin became two independent institutes owned by the Biotechnology and Biological Sciences Research Council in 1993 – the Babraham Institute and the Roslin Institute. Animal genetics research had been gradually consolidating on the Roslin site since 1986, and all agricultural research at Babraham had ceased by 1998.

The institute became a company limited by guarantee and a charity registered in Scotland, with the BBSRC as its sponsor, in 1995.

=== University of Edinburgh (2008–present) ===
In 2006, the BBSRC announced that the institute would move to a new site on the University of Edinburgh's Easter Bush campus, under the direction of David Hume. As part of the plans, the Roslin Institute merged with the Neuropathogenesis Unit of the Institute for Animal Health, well known for its role in deciphering the biology of transmissible spongiform encephalopathies and this was headed by Jean Manson.

In April 2008, the combined institute became part of the University of Edinburgh's Royal (Dick) School of Veterinary Studies, and the institute's 197 staff members became University of Edinburgh employees on 1 May. The move to Easter Bush was completed in March 2011. Under the original plans, the new institute was to be known as EBRC, but the institute ultimately retained the Roslin name.

In February 2020, Bruce Whitelaw became interim director of the institute, replacing Eleanor Riley, who had been director since 2017.

== Honours ==
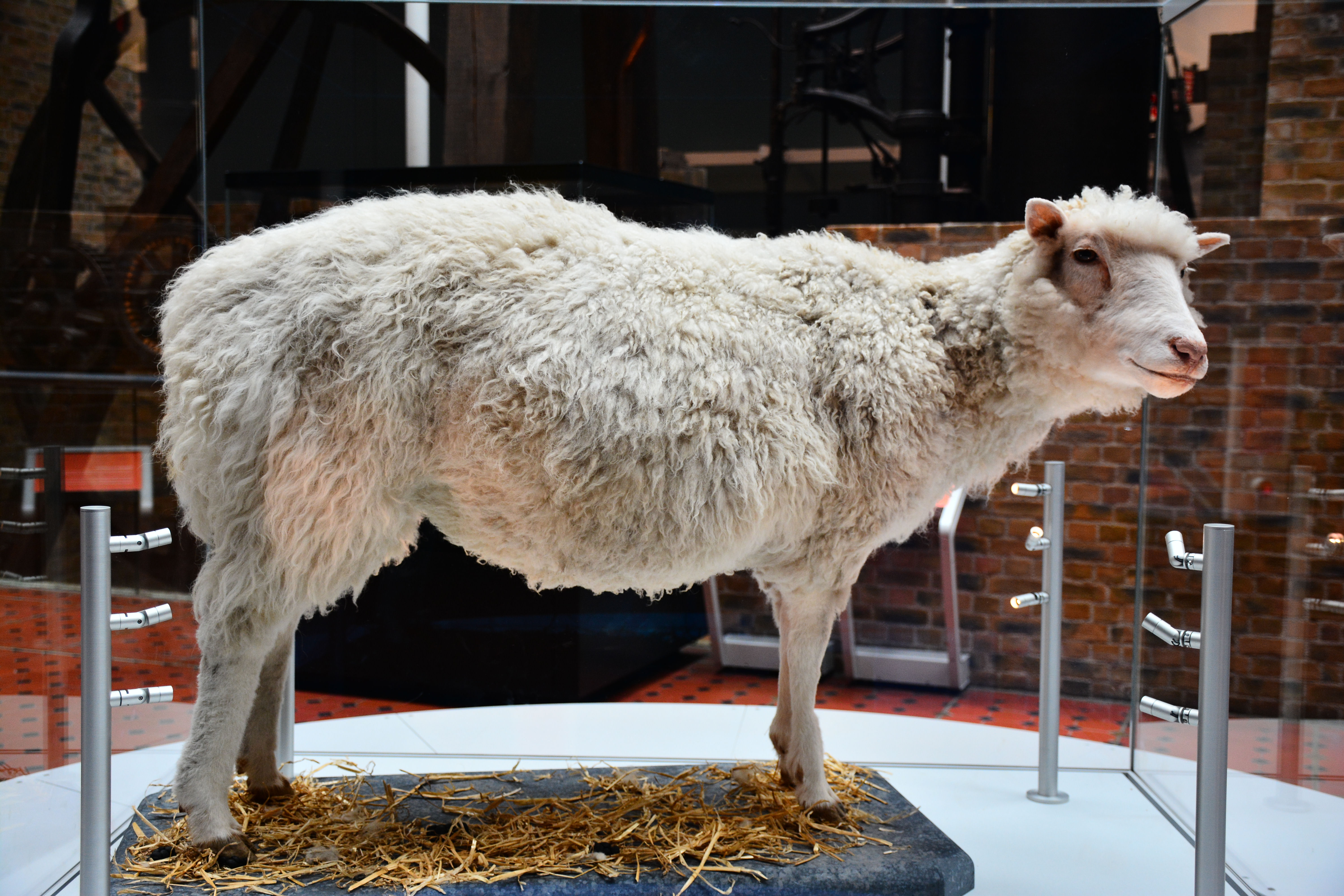
Dolly the sheep on display at the National Museum of Scotland

In 1996, the institute won international fame when Ian Wilmut, Keith Campbell, and their colleagues created Dolly the sheep, the first mammal to be successfully cloned from an adult cell, at the institute. A year later, two other sheep named Polly and Molly were cloned, each of which contained a human gene.

Roslin has made many other contributions to animal science and biotechnology research, especially in the area of livestock improvement and welfare through the application of quantitative genetics. In 2007, a Roslin team developed genetically modified chickens capable of laying eggs containing proteins needed to make cancer-fighting drugs.

== Research ==
Research at the Roslin Institute is categorised into four scientific divisions:

- Functional Genetics and Development
- Genetics and genomics
- Infection and immunity
- Clinical sciences

Three Institute Strategic Programmes, which are funded by the Biotechnology and Biological Sciences Research Council, span the Divisions of the institute.

- Blueprints for Healthy Animals
- Control of Infectious Diseases
- Improving Animal Production & Welfare

== Directors ==
=== Poultry Research Centre ===
- Alan William Greenwood (1947–1962)
- Toby Christopher Carter (1962–1978)
- David WF Shannon (1978–1986)

=== Animal Breeding Research Organisation ===
- Robert Gordon White (1947–1951)
- Richard Alan Beatty (Post WW2-1957)
- Hugh Paterson Donald (1951–1974)
- John King (1974–1982)
- Roger Burton Land (1982–1986)

=== Edinburgh Research Station ===
- Roger Burton Land (1986–1988)
- Grahame Bulfield (1988–1993)

=== Roslin Institute ===
- Grahame Bulfield (1993–2002)
- John Clark (2002–2004)
- Harry Griffin (2004–2007)
- David Hume (2007–2017)
- Bruce Whitelaw (acting) (2017)
- Eleanor Riley (2017–2020)
- Bruce Whitelaw (2020–2025)
- Mark Stevens (2025–2026; interim director)
- John Hammond (2026–)
