= Dolly (sheep) =

First cloned mammal (1996–2003)

- Dolly with her firstborn lamb, Bonnie
- Other name: 6LLS (code name)
- Species: Domestic sheep (Finn-Dorset)
- Sex: Female
- Born: 5 July 1996; Roslin Institute, Midlothian, Scotland
- Died: 14 February 2003 (aged 6); Roslin Institute, Midlothian, Scotland
- Cause of death: Euthanasia
- Resting place: National Museum of Scotland (remains on display)
- Known for: First mammal cloned from an adult somatic cell
- Offspring: 6 lambs (Bonnie; twins Sally and Rosie; triplets Lucy, Darcy and Cotton)
- Named after: Dolly Parton

Dolly (5 July 1996 – 14 February 2003) was a female Finn-Dorset sheep and the first mammal that was cloned from an adult somatic cell. She was cloned by associates of the Roslin Institute in Scotland, using the process of nuclear transfer from a cell taken from a mammary gland (somatic cell nuclear transfer). Her cloning proved that a cloned organism could be produced from a mature cell from a specific body part. Contrary to popular belief, she was not the first animal to be cloned.

The employment of adult somatic cells instead of embryonic stem cells for cloning emerged from the foundational work of John Gurdon, who cloned African clawed frogs in 1958 with this approach. The successful cloning of Dolly led to advancements in stem cell research, including the discovery of induced pluripotent stem cells.

Dolly lived at the Roslin Institute throughout her life and produced several lambs. She was euthanised at the age of six years due to a progressive lung disease. No cause that linked the disease to her cloning was found.

Dolly's body was preserved and donated by the Roslin Institute in Scotland to the National Museum of Scotland, where it has been regularly exhibited since 2003.

== Genesis ==
Dolly was cloned by Keith Campbell, Ian Wilmut and colleagues at the Roslin Institute, part of the University of Edinburgh, Scotland, and the biotechnology company PPL Therapeutics, based near Edinburgh. The funding for Dolly's cloning was provided by PPL Therapeutics and the Ministry of Agriculture. She was born on 5 July 1996. She has been called "the world's most famous sheep" by sources including BBC News and Scientific American.

The cell used as the donor for the cloning of Dolly was taken from a mammary gland, and the production of a healthy clone, therefore, proved that a cell taken from a specific part of the body could recreate a whole individual. On Dolly's name, Wilmut stated, "Dolly is derived from a mammary gland cell and we couldn't think of a more impressive pair of glands than Dolly Parton's."

== Birth ==
Dolly was born on 5 July 1996 and had three mothers: one provided the egg, another the DNA, and a third carried the cloned embryo to term. She was created using the technique of somatic cell nuclear transfer, where the cell nucleus from an adult cell is transferred into an unfertilised oocyte (developing egg cell) that has had its cell nucleus removed. The hybrid cell is then stimulated to divide by an electric shock, and when it develops into a blastocyst it is implanted in a surrogate mother. Dolly was the first clone produced from a cell taken from an adult mammal. The production of Dolly showed that genes in the nucleus of such a mature differentiated somatic cell are still capable of reverting to an embryonic totipotent state, creating a cell that can then go on to develop into any part of an animal.

Dolly's existence was announced to the public on 22 February 1997. It gained much attention in the media. A commercial with Scottish scientists playing with sheep was aired on TV, and a special report in Time magazine featured Dolly. Science featured Dolly as the breakthrough of the year. Even though Dolly was not the first animal cloned, she received media attention because she was the first cloned from an adult cell.

== Life ==
The cloning process that produced Dolly

Dolly lived her entire life at the Roslin Institute in Midlothian. There she was bred with a Welsh Mountain ram and produced six lambs in total. Her first lamb, named Bonnie, was born in April 1998. The following year, Dolly produced twin lambs, Sally and Rosie; further, she gave birth to the triplets Lucy, Darcy and Cotton in 2000. In late 2001, at the age of four, Dolly developed arthritis and started to have difficulty walking. This was treated with anti-inflammatory drugs.

== Death ==
On 14 February 2003, Dolly was euthanised because she had a progressive lung disease and severe arthritis. A Finn Dorset such as Dolly has a life expectancy of around 11 to 12 years, but Dolly lived 6.5 years. A post-mortem examination showed she had a form of lung cancer called ovine pulmonary adenocarcinoma, also known as Jaagsiekte, which is a fairly common disease of sheep and is caused by the retrovirus JSRV. Roslin scientists stated that they did not think there was a connection with Dolly being a clone, and that other sheep in the same flock had died of the same disease. Such lung diseases are a particular danger for sheep kept indoors, and Dolly was made to sleep inside for security reasons.

Some in the press speculated that a contributing factor to Dolly's death was that she could have been born with a genetic age of six years, the same age as the sheep from which she was cloned. One basis for this idea was the finding that Dolly's telomeres were short, which is typically a result of the ageing process. The Roslin Institute stated that intensive health screening did not reveal any abnormalities in Dolly that could have come from advanced aging.

In 2016 scientists reported no defects in thirteen cloned sheep, including four from the same cell line as Dolly. The first study to review the long-term health outcomes of cloning, the authors found no evidence of late-onset, non-communicable diseases other than some minor examples of osteoarthritis and concluded "We could find no evidence, therefore, of a detrimental long-term effect of cloning by SCNT on the health of aged offspring among our cohort."

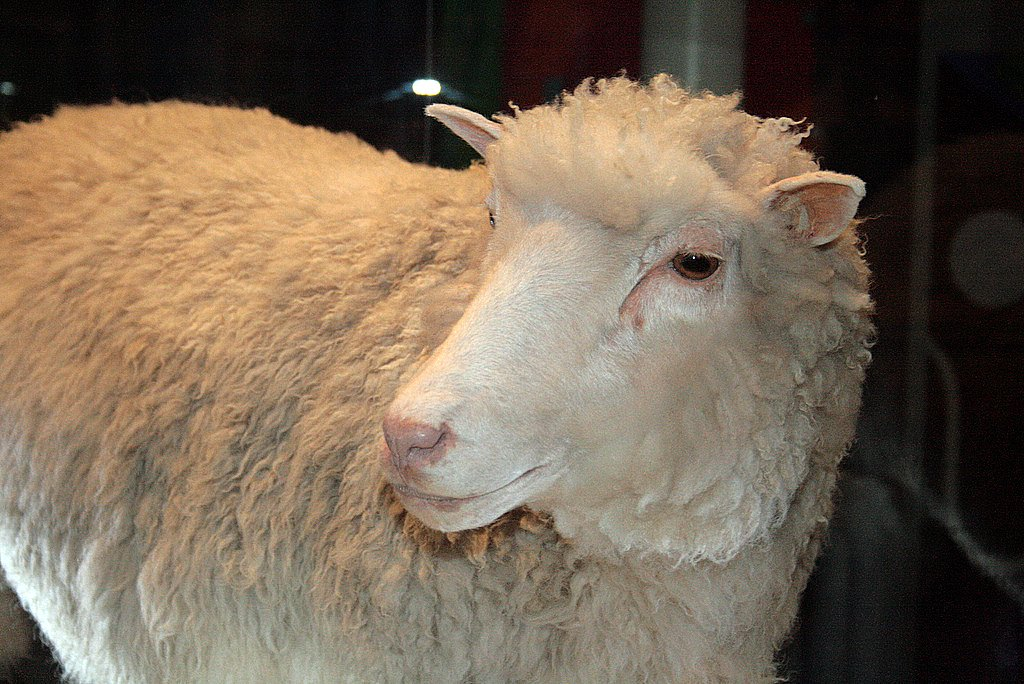
The taxidermy mount of Dolly on exhibit at the National Museum of Scotland in 2009

After her death, Dolly's body was preserved via taxidermy and is currently on display at the National Museum of Scotland in Edinburgh.

== Legacy ==
After cloning was successfully demonstrated through the production of Dolly, many other large mammals were cloned, including pigs, deer, horses and cattle. The attempt to clone argali (mountain sheep) did not produce viable embryos. The attempt to clone a banteng bull was more successful, as were the attempts to clone mouflon (a form of wild sheep), both resulting in viable offspring. The reprogramming process that cells need to go through during cloning is not perfect and embryos produced by nuclear transfer often show abnormal development. Making cloned mammals was highly inefficient in 1996; Dolly was the only lamb that survived to adulthood from 277 attempts. Wilmut, who led the team that created Dolly, announced in 2007 that the nuclear transfer technique may never be sufficiently efficient for use in humans. But by 2014, Chinese scientists were reported to have 70–80% success rates in cloning pigs, and in 2016 Sooam Biotech was producing 500 cloned embryos a day. Another commercial pet cloning company, Viagen, charges $50,000 (£38,000) to clone a dog, $30,000 for a cat, and $85,000 for a horse, showing cloning economy is getting more popular.

Cloning may have uses in preserving endangered species, and may become a viable tool for reviving extinct species. In January 2009, scientists from the Centre of Food Technology and Research of Aragon in northern Spain announced the cloning of the Pyrenean ibex, a form of wild mountain goat, which was officially declared extinct in 2000. Although the newborn ibex died shortly after birth due to physical defects in its lungs, it is the first time an extinct animal has been cloned, and may open doors for saving endangered and newly extinct species by resurrecting them from frozen tissue.

In July 2016, four identical clones of Dolly (Daisy, Debbie, Dianna and Denise) were alive and healthy at nine years old. They were euthanised following research published in 2017.

Scientific American concluded in 2016 that the main legacy of Dolly has not been cloning of animals but in advances into stem cell research. Gene targeting was added in 2000, when researchers cloned the female lamb Diana from sheep DNA altered to contain the human gene for alpha 1-antitrypsin. The human gene was specifically activated in the ewe’s mammary gland, so Diana produced milk containing human alpha 1-antitrypsin. After Dolly, researchers realised that ordinary cells could be reprogrammed to induced pluripotent stem cells, which can be grown into any tissue.

The first successful cloning of a primate species was reported in January 2018, using the same method which produced Dolly. Two identical clones of a macaque monkey, Zhong Zhong and Hua Hua, were created by researchers in China and were born in late 2017.

In January 2019, scientists in China reported the creation of five identical cloned gene-edited monkeys, again using this method, and the gene-editing CRISPR-Cas9 technique allegedly used by He Jiankui in creating the first ever gene-modified human babies, Lulu and Nana. The monkey clones were made in order to study several medical diseases.

== In popular culture ==
The Brazilian telenovela O Clone (2001) drew inspiration for its central plot from the cloning of Dolly, exploring the subject of human cloning through the character played by Murilo Benício, the story's protagonist. The production is one of the major successes of its creator, Glória Perez.

In 2003 the Belgian artist Dominique Goblet published a short comic strip about Dolly with the title: "2004 Apparition de Dolly dans la campagne anglaise".

== See also ==
- In re Roslin Institute (Edinburgh) – US court decision that determined that Dolly could not be patented
- List of cloned animals
