= List of public policy topics by country =

This is a list of articles on public policy topics, arranged by country.

== Australia ==
- Energy policy of Australia
- Australian immigration policies
- Visa policy of Australia

== Bolivia ==
- Domestic policy of Evo Morales
- Foreign policy of Evo Morales

== Brazil ==
- Energy policy of Brazil
- Same-sex immigration policy in Brazil

== Canada ==
- Arctic policy of Canada
- Domestic policy of the Harper government
- Drug policy of Canada
- Economic policy of the Harper government
- Energy policy of Canada
- Environmental policy of the Harper government
- Foreign policy of the Harper government
- Language policies of Canada's provinces and territories
  - Legal dispute over Quebec's language policy

== China ==
- Hong Kong cultural policy
- Energy policy of China
- Stem cell laws and policy in China
- Arctic policy of China

== Ecuador ==
- Foreign policy of Rafael Correa

== European Union ==
- Common Agricultural Policy
- Cultural policies of the European Union
- Common Security and Defence Policy
- Energy policy of the European Union
- Space policy of the European Union
- Arctic policy of the European Union

== France ==
- Domestic policy of Nicolas Sarkozy
- Foreign policy of François Mitterrand
- Language policy in France

== Germany ==
- Nazi Foreign Policy (debate)
- Visa policy of Germany

== India ==
- Energy policy of India
- Environmental policy of the Government of India
- Visa policy of India

== Iran ==
- Labour and tax laws in Iran
- Foreign policy of Mahmoud Ahmadinejad

== Japan ==
- Defence policy of Japan
- Foreign policy of Japan
- Industrial policy of Japan
- International economic cooperation policy of Japan
- Monetary and fiscal policy of Japan
- Trade policy of Japan
- Visa policy of Japan

== Kazakhstan ==
- Energy policy of Kazakhstan

== Laos ==
- Drug policy in Laos

== Latvia ==
- Language policy in Latvia

== Malaysia ==
- National Development Policy
- Energy policy of Malaysia

== Myanmar ==
- Foreign policy of Myanmar

== Netherlands ==
- Drug policy of the Netherlands

== Pakistan ==
- Pakistan national energy policy

== Portugal ==
- Drug policy of Portugal

== Romania ==
- Energy policy of Romania

== Russia ==
- Energy policy of Russia
- Foreign policy of Vladimir Putin
- Arctic policy of Russia

== South Korea ==
- Immigration Policy of Korea

== Soviet Union ==
- Drug policy of the Soviet Union
- Energy policy of the Soviet Union

== Sri Lanka ==
- National Medicinal Drugs Policy

== Sweden ==
- Drug policy of Sweden
- Monetary policy of Sweden

== Turkey ==
- Foreign policy of the Recep Tayyip Erdoğan government

== United Kingdom ==
- Energy policy of the United Kingdom
  - Energy policy of Scotland

== United States ==
- Agricultural policy of the United States
- Arctic policy of the United States
- Climate change policy of the United States
  - Climate change policy of the George W. Bush administration
- Domestic policy of the United States
  - Domestic policy of the Ronald Reagan administration
  - Domestic policy of the George W. Bush administration
- Drug policy of the United States
  - Drug policy of California
  - Drug policy of Colorado
  - Drug policy of Maryland
  - Drug policy of Virginia
- Economic policy of the United States
  - Economic policy of the George W. Bush administration
  - Economic policy of the Barack Obama administration
- Education policy of the United States
- Energy policy of the United States
  - Energy policy of the Barack Obama administration
- Environmental policy of the United States
- Fiscal policy of the United States
- Foreign policy of the United States
  - History of U.S. foreign policy
  - Criticism of American foreign policy
  - Foreign policies of American presidents
    - Foreign policy of the Ronald Reagan administration
    - Foreign policy of the Bill Clinton administration
    - Foreign policy of the George W. Bush administration
    - Foreign policy of the Barack Obama administration
      - East Asian foreign policy of the Barack Obama administration
      - European foreign policy of the Barack Obama administration
      - Middle Eastern foreign policy of the Barack Obama administration
      - South Asian foreign policy of the Barack Obama administration
- Gun control policy of the United States
  - Gun control policy of the Clinton Administration
- Immigration policy of the United States
  - U.S. immigration policy toward the People's Republic of China
  - Visa policy of the United States
  - Immigration policy of the Donald Trump administration
  - Immigration policy of the Joe Biden administration
- Monetary policy of the United States
- Nuclear policy of the United States
  - Low-level radioactive waste policy of the United States
- Science policy of the United States
- Social policy of the United States
  - Social policy of the Barack Obama administration
- Space policy of the United States
  - Space policy of the George W. Bush administration
  - Space policy of the Barack Obama administration
  - Space policy of the Donald Trump administration
- Stem cell laws and policy in the United States
- Telecommunications policy of the United States
- Trade policy of the United States
- Transportation policy of the United States
- Water resource policy of the United States

== Uruguay ==
- Nuclear energy policy of Uruguay

== Vatican City ==
- Multilateral foreign policy of the Holy See

== Venezuela ==
- Economic policy of the Hugo Chávez government
- Energy policy of Venezuela
- Foreign policy of the Hugo Chávez government

== Zaire ==
- Foreign policy of Mobutu Sese Seko

== See also ==
- Category:Foreign relations by country
- Nuclear energy policy by country
