= AfPak =

Neologism used within United States foreign policy circles

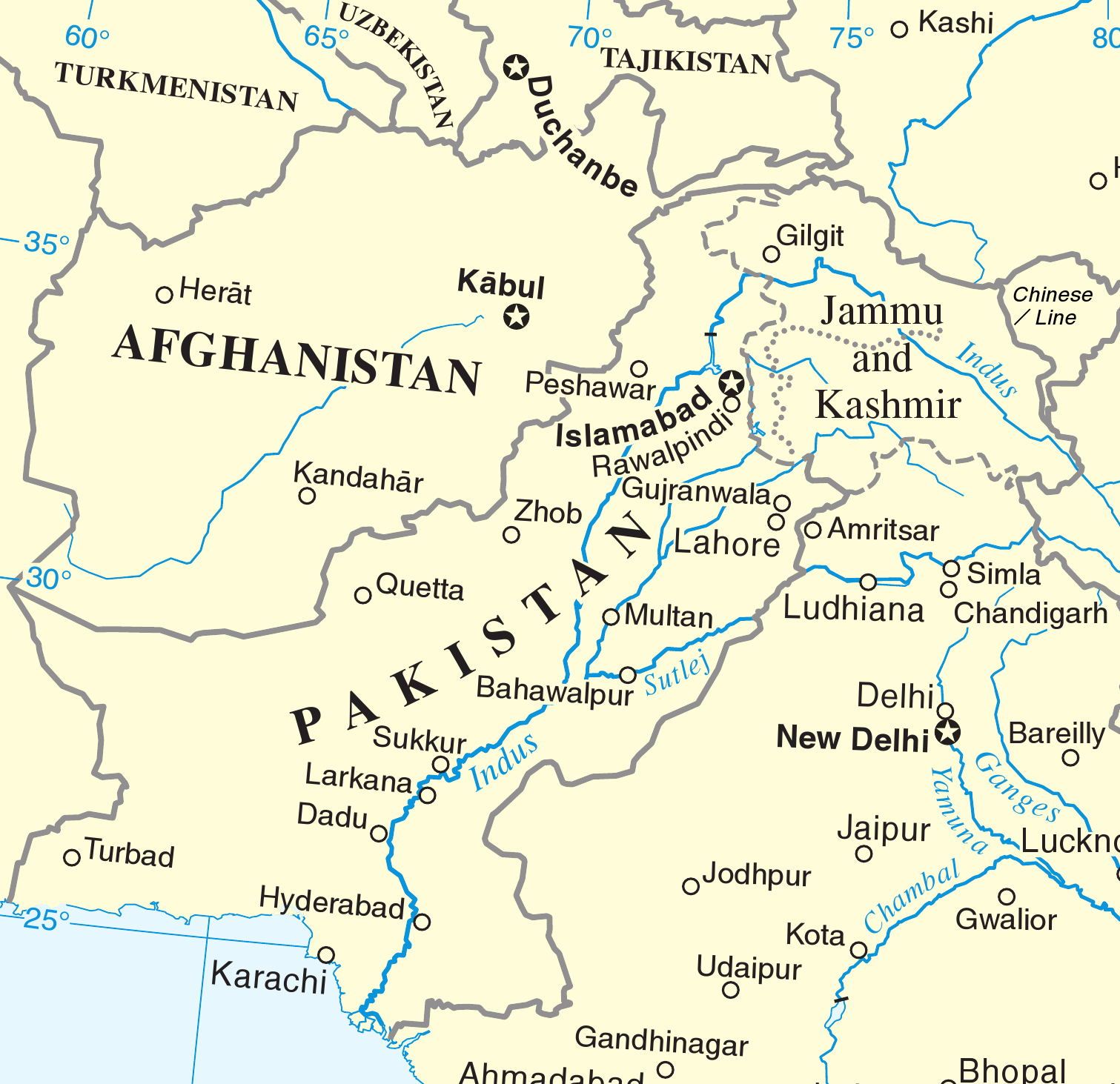
Afghanistan and Pakistan

AfPak (also spelled Af-Pak) was a neologism used within United States foreign policy circles to designate Afghanistan and Pakistan as a single theater of operations. Introduced in 2008, the neologism reflected the policy approach that was introduced by the Obama administration, which regarded the region comprising the Asian countries of Afghanistan and Pakistan as having a singular dominant political and military situation that required a joint policy in their global war on terrorism.

Following sharp criticism from Pakistan, which condemned the hyphenation of the country's geopolitics with Afghanistan, the U.S. government stopped using the term in 2010. In 2017, the Trump administration expanded its Afghanistan policy to a regional South Asia strategy, which sought continued counter-terrorism cooperation with Pakistan, but envisaged a greater economic role for India in Afghanistan; the new approach was dubbed "AfPakIndia".

== Origin ==
British writer Michael Quinion writes that the term began appearing in newspaper articles in February 2009. The term was popularized and possibly coined by Richard Holbrooke, the Obama administration's Special Representative for Afghanistan and Pakistan. In March 2008 (a year before he assumed the post), Holbrooke explained the motivation behind the term:

First of all, we often call the problem AfPak, as in Afghanistan–Pakistan. This is not just an effort to save eight syllables. It is an attempt to indicate and imprint in our DNA the fact that there is one theatre of war, straddling an ill-defined border, the Durand Line, and that on the western side of that border, NATO and other forces are able to operate. On the eastern side, it's the sovereign territory of Pakistan. But it is on the eastern side of this ill-defined border that the international terrorist movement is located.

According to the U.S. government, the common policy objective was to disrupt, dismantle, and prevent al-Qaeda and its affiliates from having a safe haven from which it can continue to operate and plot attacks against the U.S. and its allies. This policy decision represented a shift from previous ways of thinking about Afghanistan as an independent problem that required a military solution. The AfPak strategy was an attempt to win the “hearts and minds” of both Afghans and Pakistanis.

In 2009, the National Security Advisor under the Barack Obama administration, James L. Jones, proposed reversing the term to "PakAf"; this proposal was met with staunch resistance in Pakistan due to its supposed suggestion that Pakistan was the primary source of difficulty in the war on terror, according to Bob Woodward in his 2010 non-fiction book Obama's Wars.

== Impact ==
The term "AfPak" has entered the lexicon of geopolitics, and its usage implies that the primary fronts for the global war on terrorism were in Afghanistan and Pakistan at the time. It has reinforced the message that the threat to United States from pro-terrorist activities masquerading as Islamic religious policy and the resulting infrastructure of fear and disarray in the two countries are intertwined.

Official use of the term within the Obama administration has been echoed by the media, as in The Washington Post series The AfPak War and The Af-Pak Channel, a joint project of the New America Foundation and Foreign Policy magazine that was launched in August 2009.

=== In Pakistan ===
In order to better enforce border security and to halt the cross-border phenomenon that inspired the AfPak label, the Pakistani government authorized the construction of a border barrier with Afghanistan in March 2017.

== Criticism ==
The term has been widely criticized in Pakistan. Iranian author Amir Taheri writes that Holbrooke's use of the term has been resented by many Pakistanis, who see Pakistan as "in a different league than the much smaller and devastated Afghanistan." American journalist Clifford May writes that it is disliked by Afghans as well.

Pakistani journalist Saeed Shah mentioned that the international community has always had Pakistan and India bracketed together, and that Pakistan has always historically compared itself with India. He mentions that the United States has lumped Pakistan with Afghanistan under "Af-Pak", a supposed diplomatic relegation, while India is lauded as a growing power. This is a key reason why Pakistan is seeking a nuclear deal with the U.S. as "parity" with India.

In June 2009, former Pakistani president Pervez Musharraf criticized the term:

I am totally against the term AfPak. I do not support the word itself for two reasons: First, the strategy puts Pakistan on the same level as Afghanistan. We are not. Afghanistan has no government and the country is completely destabilized. Pakistan is not. Second, and this is much more important, is that there is an Indian element in the whole game. We have the Kashmir struggle, without which extremist elements like Lashkar-e-Taiba would not exist.

As seen by Pakistan, India "should have been" part of a wide regional strategy including Afghanistan, Pakistan and Kashmir. However, the Indian government argued against the proposition. Answering questions at a June 2009 press conference in Islamabad, Holbrooke "said the term 'AfPak' was not meant to demean Pakistan, but was 'bureaucratic shorthand' intended to convey that the situation in the border areas on both sides was linked and one side could not be resolved without the other". In January 2010, Holbrooke said that the Obama administration had stopped using the term: "We can't use it anymore because it does not please people in Pakistan, for understandable reasons".

== See also ==
- South Asian foreign policy of the Barack Obama administration
- Afghanistan–Pakistan relations
  - Afghanistan–Pakistan skirmishes
  - Durand Line
- Pakistan and state-sponsored terrorism
- Afghanistan–Pakistan Center of Excellence, an internal think-tank of the United States Central Command
