= Derek Harvey =

American Army officer and civil servant

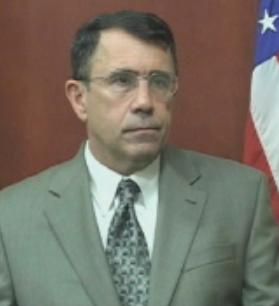

County Commissioner (Washington County, Maryland)
- Incumbent
- Assumed office December 6, 2022

Personal details
- Party: Republican
- Education: Arizona State University, Tempe (BA); University of Utah (MA, PhD)

Military service
- Allegiance: United States
- Branch/service: United States Army
- Rank: Colonel

Derek John Harvey is a retired US Army Colonel who previously served on the staff of Congressman Devin Nunes, ranking member of the House Permanent Select Committee on Intelligence. Harvey is a former National Security Council (NSC) staffer in the first presidency of Donald Trump and was the first director of the Afghanistan-Pakistan Center of Excellence at U.S. Central Command (CENTCOM), having been selected by General David Petraeus in 2009 to lead the new organization. Harvey was the previous senior analytical specialist for Iraq to Petraeus, then Commander, Multi-National Forces-Iraq. After being fired from both USCENTCOM and the NSC, he became a top aide to Republican congressman Devin Nunes on the House Intelligence Committee in September 2017. While in this role, Harvey worked to leak the name of the Ukraine whistle-blower, causing concern about their safety and legal protections of whistle-blowers. In 2022, Derek Harvey was elected to serve a four year term on the Board of County Commissioners in Washington County, Maryland. In early 2026, Harvey resigned from the Board of County Commissioners citing future business opportunities as his main reason.

== Career ==
=== Iraq ===
Harvey retired from the U.S. Army as a colonel in 2006 after 26 years service as an intelligence officer and Middle East Foreign Area Officer. Prior to joining DIA as a civilian in early 2006, then Colonel Harvey was the Senior Analyst for Iraq, Joint Staff Directorate for Intelligence, from November 2004 to December 2005. Previously, he was Chief, Commander's Assessments and Initiatives Group/Senior Intelligence Analyst for MNF-Iraq, and "Red Cell" Team Chief for CJTF-7 in Iraq. He also participated in the Joint Strategic Assessment Team established by Ambassador Ryan Crocker and General David Petraeus to assess the situation in Iraq and to develop their combined campaign plan. Harvey is credited by some sources for predicting the insurgency in Iraq, as well as the defeat of Al-Qaida in Iraq in early 2007.

=== Afghanistan ===
Associate Editor of Washington Post Bob Woodward wrote in his 2010 book titled Obama's Wars (Simon & Schuster, NY): Derek Harvey was "one of [the U.S. Lt. General and then Commander of CENTCOM, David] Petraeus' most trusted intelligence advisors in Iraq", who in January 2009 was at CENTCOM HQ in Tampa, FL, as part of a team of 80 intelligence specialists "drilling down on the Afghanistan component of [President Obama's National Security Council directed Strategic] review". Woodward said, "Harvey approached intelligence with a step-by-step methodology of a homicide detective...Harvey 'widened the aperture' studying prisoner interrogations, battlefield reports, and reams of enemy documents...by sifting through the enemy's paper trail, he pieced together clues that others might miss." In a personal meeting of Harvey with Gen. Petraeus in January 2009 as part of the NSC strategic review, Woodward reports that Petraeus asked what Harvey had learned about the Afghanistan situation. In reply, Harvey stated: "It's the blind leading the blind." According to Woodward, Harvey told Petraeus the US remained dangerously ignorant about the Afghan insurgency. Basic questions had gone unasked over the [7 prior year] course of the war: Who is the enemy? Where are they? How do they see the fight? What are their motivations? Harvey told Petraeus "We know too little about the enemy [in Afghanistan-Pakistan region] to craft a winning strategy" (see p. 77, State of War) Harvey added the current strategy put America on the path to defeat and—unless the intelligence gaps were filled—a new strategy would be futile. Harvey added that, despite the contrary view of then U.S. Commander in Afghanistan, General David McKiernan, "reconciliation efforts are likely the only way out of the war."

Based on what Harvey reported to General Petraeus, according to Woodward's book, Petraeus "decided to create his own intelligence agency inside CentCom" (p. 78, "Obama's War") to offset the shortcomings of the DNI, CIA, NSA, DIA and other US intelligence gathering agencies in gathering information about the Afghanistan-Pakistan region. He asked Harvey to draft plans for an agency modeled on Harvey's approach. Reports Woodward, "Soon, Harvey was appointed director of the new Afghanistan-Pakistan Center of Excellence based at CentCom headquarters in Tampa, Florida." States Woodward, "Harvey threw his life into the [new] job. He started each morning at 4 a.m., worked 15-hr days and rarely slept through the night. The obsession came at a personal cost. Harvey's wife filed for divorce...". Woodward goes on to explain Harvey's approach in the new CentCom intelligence agency in some detail, and that Harvey reached the conclusion that "the war could be won, but the U.S. government would have to make monumental long-term commitments for years that might be unpalatable with voters" (p. 79, Obama's Wars).

=== National Security Council ===
On January 27, 2017, Harvey was tapped by former National Security Advisor Michael Flynn to join the National Security Council, as the Senior Director for Middle East and North African affairs. National Security Advisor H.R. McMaster, a long time associate of Harvey's, dismissed him from his position on the National Security Council on July 27, 2017, after a series of reported disagreements.

=== United States House Permanent Select Committee on Intelligence ===
In September 2017, following his dismissal from the National Security Council, Harvey became a top aide to Devin Nunes, chairman of the House Permanent Select Committee on Intelligence, which was investigating Russian interference in the 2016 United States elections until March 12, 2018.

=== Coordination with Lev Parnas ===
On January 17, 2020, text messages released by the House indicated that Harvey coordinated with Ukrainian-American Lev Parnas to obtain negative information against Trump's political opponent Joe Biden and to bolster the discredited claims that it was Ukraine and not Russia that interfered in the 2016 election. The messages added weight to claims made in 2019 by Parnas's attorney that Harvey met with Rudy Giuliani, Lev Parnas, and their associates at the Trump hotel in Washington, D.C. Further that Harvey cancelled a trip to meet with Ukrainian officials in person to avoid having to disclose the meeting with Congressman Adam Schiff and that he phoned and Skyped instead.

Harvey sued CNN, Lev Parnas and Parnas's attorney for defamation in October 2020, claiming they had falsely accused him of criminal, unethical, and dishonest conduct. The case was dismissed by federal judge Richard Bennett on February 17, 2021. Two days later, a similar defamation suit filed by Nunes against CNN was dismissed by federal judge Laura Taylor Swain. In April 2021, Bennett found Harvey and his attorney had acted in bad faith and ordered them to pay CNN's court costs and legal fees.

=== Washington County, Maryland ===
In 2022, Derek Harvey was elected to serve a four year term on the Board of County Commissioners in Washington County, Maryland. His position will expire in 2026. In August 2025, Harvey said he intended to run for re-election though he hadn't yet filed his candidacy. Harvey resigned from the Board of County Commissioners effective February 26, 2026. The commissioners announced that "In his resignation letter, he cited new business opportunities that better align with the needs of his family and long-term professional goals as the reason for his departure."

== See also ==
- Timeline of investigations into Trump and Russia (July–December 2018)
