= Public policy =

Government proposals, principles and actions

Public policy is the set of laws, regulations, guidelines, and other actions that a government implements or proposes to address social issues. It is often implemented through programs in education, health care, employment, finance, economics, and transportation. The implementation of public policy is known as public administration. Some scholars define public policy as the sum of a government's direct and indirect activities while others define it by a government's stated goals.

They are created and/or enacted on behalf of the public, typically by a government. Sometimes they are made by Non-state actors or are made in co-production with communities or citizens, which can include potential experts, scientists, engineers and stakeholders or scientific data, or sometimes use some of their results. They are typically made by policy-makers affiliated with (in democratic polities) currently elected politicians. Therefore, the "policy process is a complex political process in which there are many actors: elected politicians, political party leaders, pressure groups, civil servants, publicly employed professionals, judges, non-governmental organizations, international agencies, academic experts, journalists and even sometimes citizens who see themselves as the passive recipients of policy."

A popular way of understanding and engaging in public policy is through a series of stages known as "the policy cycle", which was first discussed by the political scientist Harold Laswell in his book The Decision Process: Seven Categories of Functional Analysis, published in 1956. The characterization of particular stages can vary, but a basic sequence is agenda setting, policy formulation, legitimation, implementation, and evaluation. "It divides the policy process into a series of stages, from a notional starting point at which policymakers begin to think about a policy problem to a notional end point at which a policy has been implemented, and policymakers think about how successful it has been before deciding what to do next."

Officials considered that policymakers bear responsibility for advancing the interests of various stakeholders. Policy design entails conscious and deliberate effort to define policy aims and map them instrumentally. Academics and other experts in policy studies have developed a range of tools and approaches to help in this task. Government action is the decisions, policies, and actions taken by governments, which can have a significant impact on individuals, organizations, and society at large. Regulations, subsidies, taxes, and spending plans are just a few of the various shapes it might take. Government action aims to achieve certain social or economic objectives, such as fostering economic growth, reducing inequality, or safeguarding the environment.

== Varying conceptions of public policy ==
Public policy can be conceptualized in various ways, depending on the speaker's or author's purposes and the characteristics of the situation at hand.

One dividing line in conceptions of public policy is between those who see it primarily in terms of ideas (principles and plans of action) and those who see it as a collection of empirical phenomena (the things that are done and their outcomes). The first of these conceptualizations is suitable when the matter of concern is relatively simple and unambiguous, and the means of enactment are expected to be highly disciplined. But where the matter is complex and/or contested – where intentions are confused and/or disguised – it may not be possible to define the policy ideas clearly and unambiguously. In this case, it may be useful to identify a policy in terms of what actually happens.

David Easton in the USA of the 1950s provided an illustration of the need he found to broaden his conceptualization of public policy beyond stated ideas: "If the formal policy of an educational system forbids discrimination against Negroes but local school boards or administrators so zone school attendance that Negroes are segregated in a few schools, both the impartial law and discriminatory practices must be considered part of the policy." Easton characterized public policy as "a web of decisions and actions that allocates values".

Other definitions of public policy in terms of a broad range of empirical phenomena include that of Paul Cairney: "the sum total of government action from signals of intent to the final outcomes".

An example of conceiving public policy as ideas is a definition by Richard Titmuss: "the principles that govern action directed towards given ends". Titmuss' perspective was particularly one of social contract ethics.

In 2020, Antonio Lassance has defined public policy as "an institutionalized proposal to solve a central problem, guided by a conception" (Lassance, 2020: 7). Lassance's perspective and concerns are grounded in a theory of change or program theory which he believes can be empirically tested.

One of the most known and controversial concepts of public policy is that of Thomas R. Dye, according to whom "public policy is whatever governments choose to do or not to do" (Dye, 1972: 2). Although widely used, Dye's concept is also criticized as being an empty concept. Dye himself admitted that his concept "discourages elaborate academic discussions of the definition of public policy - we say simply that public policy is whatever governments choose to do or not to do".

In an institutionalist view, the foundation of public policy is composed of national constitutional laws and regulations. Further foundational aspects include both judicial interpretations and regulations, which are generally authorized by legislation. Public policy is considered strong when it solves problems efficiently and effectively, serves and supports governmental institutions and policies, and encourages active citizenship.

In his book Advanced Introduction to Public Policy, B. Guy Peters defines public policy as "the set of activities that governments engage in for the purpose of changing their economy and society", effectively saying that public policy is legislation brought in to benefit or impact the electorate in some way. In another definition, author B. Dente in his book Understanding Policy Decisions explains public policy as "a set of actions that affect the solution of a policy problem, i.e., a dissatisfaction regarding a certain need, demand or opportunity for public intervention. Its quality is measured by the capacity to create public value."

Other scholars define public policy as a system of "courses of action, regulatory measures, laws, and funding priorities concerning a given topic promulgated by a governmental entity or its representatives". Public policy is commonly embodied in "constitutions, legislative acts, and judicial decisions". Transformative constitutions of the Global South consider judicial actions for Public policy as paramount, since the political forces that facilitate legislative decisions may run counter to the will of the people.

Public policy focuses on the decisions that produce the outputs of a political system, such as transport policies, the management of a public health service, the administration of a school system, and the organization of a defense force. The directly measurable policy outputs, "actions actually taken in pursuance of policy decisions and statements," can be differentiated from the broader policy outcomes, "focus[ing] on a policy's societal consequences."

In the United States, this concept refers not only to the results of policies but, more broadly, to the decision-making and analysis behind governmental decisions. As an academic discipline, public policy is studied by professors and students at public policy schools of major universities throughout the country. The U.S. professional association of public policy practitioners, researchers, scholars, and students is the Association for Public Policy Analysis and Management.

Much of public policy concerns the evaluation of decision-making in governments and public bureaucracies.

== Frameworks of public policy ==
Public policy frameworks provide systematic approaches to policy implementation, analysis, and improvement, offering insights into the roles of actors, institutional dynamics, and the broader context that influences decisions.

=== Policy Cycle Framework ===
Proposed by Harold Lasswell, the policy cycle framework is one of the oldest public policy frameworks. It outlines a sequence of stages in the policymaking process: agenda-setting, policy formulation, implementation, and evaluation. This framework emphasizes the iterative and dynamic nature of policymaking, enabling a structured analysis of how policies evolve.

=== Multiple Streams Framework ===
Developed by John Kingdon, this framework focuses on the convergence of three streams—problems, policies, and politics—to create a "policy window" for change. Kingdon emphasizes the critical role of timing and policy entrepreneurs in shaping policy outcomes.

=== Punctuated Equilibrium Theory ===
Proposed by Frank Baumgartner and Bryan Jones, this theory explains periods of policy stability punctuated by sudden, significant changes. According to Baumgartner and Jones, these shifts occur due to interactions between institutional dynamics and issue framing.

=== Policy Feedback Theory ===
Suzanne Mettler and Mallory SoRelle advanced the policy feedback theory, which examines how existing policies influence future political and social dynamics. Their framework highlights the feedback loops that policies create, shaping subsequent political action and societal responses.

=== Advocacy Coalition Framework ===
Introduced by Paul Sabatier, this framework explores how coalitions of actors with shared beliefs influence policy processes over extended periods. Sabatier's work is particularly valuable for understanding policy change in complex and contested policy areas.

=== Non-Linear Public Policy Framework ===
Proposed by Sharique Hassan Manazir, the non-linear public policy framework challenges traditional stage-based models of policymaking by emphasising complexity, feedback loops, and interactions among multiple actors. Unlike linear frameworks such as the policy cycle, this approach views policymaking as a dynamic and evolving process shaped by socio-political contexts, institutional constraints, and technological systems. It highlights how policies are continuously reconfigured through interactions between state and non-state actors, rather than progressing through fixed sequential stages. The framework enables a more realistic analysis of contemporary governance, particularly in complex and rapidly changing policy environments.

== Public policy making and implementation ==
Public policymaking can be characterized as a dynamic, complex, and interactive system through which public problems are identified and resolved by creating new policy or reforming existing policy.

Public problems can arise in countless ways and require different policy responses (such as regulations, subsidies, import quotas, and laws) at the local, national, or international level. The public problems that influence public policy making can be of economic, social, or political nature.

A government holds a legal monopoly on the initiation or threat of physical force to achieve its ends when necessary. For instance, in times of chaos, when quick decision-making is needed.

=== Public policy visualization ===
A topology model can be used to demonstrate the types of and implementation of public policy:

The Types of Government Action
| | Direct | Indirect |
|---|---|---|
| Money | Trade: Make and Buy | Transfer: Tax and Subsidize |
| Other | Regulation: Oblige and Prohibit | Knowledge: Inform and Implore |

Direct government action involving the use of money can be classified into 2 subsections. A government can either use its available resources to address the issue (Make) or contract out to the private sector (Buy).

Indirect government action involving money is the use of fiscal policy to influence behaviours. These take the form of levying taxes (Tax) or subsidizing an alternative (Subsidize).

Other direct government action falls under the category of regulation. This is when a government uses its authority to make people behave in a certain way (Oblige) or to make a behaviour illegal (Prohibit).

Indirect government action without the use of money can again be classified into 2 types. A government can provide information to its citizens on a particular issue, with hopes it affects their behaviour (Inform), or by appealing to their morality as a human or as a stakeholder in society (Implore).

=== Public policy making ===
Public policy making is a time-consuming 'policy cycle'.

The policy cycle as set out in Understanding Public Policy: Theories and Issues.

==== Agenda setting ====
Agenda setting identifies problems that require government attention, determines which issues deserve the most attention, and defines the nature of the problem.

===== Social construction of problems =====
Most public problems arise from the reflection of social and ideological values. As societies and communities evolve, the nature in which norms, customs and morals are proven acceptable, unacceptable, desirable or undesirable changes as well. Thus, the search of crucial problems to solve becomes difficult to distinguish within 'top-down' governmental bodies.

===== Policy stream =====
The policy stream is a concept developed by John Kingdon as a model proposed to show compelling problems need to be conjoined with two other factors: an appropriate political climate and favorable and feasible solutions (attached to problems) that flow together to move onto the policy agenda. This reinforces the policy window, another concept that highlights the critical moment in time and situation when a new policy could be motivated.

===== Problem stream =====
Because the definition of public problems is not obvious, they are most often denied and not acted upon. The problem stream represents a policy process for prioritizing which problems warrant policies and solutions. This is represented in five discrete factors:

- Indicators: Scientific measurements, qualitative, and statistical data using empirical evidence, are used to bring relevance to particular phenomena.
- Interpretation: Policymakers make judgements whether an issue constitutes a problem worthy of action.
- Ideology: Elements of dominant values, customs, and beliefs are crucial to devising problems that need attention.
- Instances: Media coverage supports by drawing attention to issues, thus prompting policymakers to respond and address changes.

Therefore, John Kingdon's model suggests the policy window appears through the emergence and connection of problems, politics and policies, emphasizing an opportunity to stimulate and initiate new policies.

===== Issue attention cycle =====
The issue attention cycle is a concept developed by Anthony Downs (1972) in which problems progress through five distinct stages. This reinforces how the policy agenda does not necessarily lead to policy change, as public interest dissipates, most problems end up resolving themselves or get ignored by policymakers. Its key stages include:

1. Pre-problem stage: The problem is not recognized by the public, media, or policy makers.
2. Alarmed discovery and euphoric enthusiasm: Something is identified as a problem, supported by the media to pursue the seriousness of the problem
3. Realization of costs which the solutions will incur: Investigating through cost-benefit analysis, bringing awareness of financial, environmental, and structural curbs to consider solutions and what their consequences are.
4. Decline in public interest in issue: Citizens acquire acceptance of the problem, and it becomes normalized. Newer issues attract public attention. A limited attention span encourages policymakers to delay developing policy to see which public problems demand necessary and worthwhile solutions.
5. Issue slips off, or back down, the policy agenda: The issue effectively disappears, although it can re-emerge in other pressing circumstances.

==== Policy formulation ====
This sets out the policy objectives and identifies the costs and effects of solutions that could be proposed using policy instruments.

==== Legitimation ====
Legitimation is the process of gathering approval/ support for policy instruments, involving one or a combination of executive approval, legislative approval, and consent sought through consultation or referendums.

==== Implementation ====
Policy implementation is establishing or employing an organization to take responsibility for the policy, ensuring the organization has the resources/legal authority to do so, and ensuring the policy is carried out as planned. An example of this would be the establishment of the Department of Education.

===== Enforcement =====
Enforcement mechanisms are a central part of various policies. Enforcement mechanisms co-determine natural resource governance outcomes and pollution-related policies may require proper enforcement mechanisms (and often substitutes) to have a positive effect. Enforcement may include law enforcement or combine incentive and disincentive-based policy instruments. A meta-analysis of policy studies across multiple policy domains suggests enforcement mechanisms are the "only modifiable treaty design choice" with the potential to improve the mostly low effectiveness of international treaties.

==== Policy-Implementation gap ====
The Policy-Implementation gap refers to the difference between policy ideas and goals on paper and their implementation in practice. This gap arises when the goals, objectives, or provisions of a policy fail to be fully realized in practice, often due to challenges, inefficiencies, or unforeseen obstacles in the implementation process. As an issue, it is often overlooked by governments, with implementation seen as an afterthought, sometimes referred to as 'the rest'.

==== Top-down and bottom-up implementation ====
"Top-down" and "bottom-up" describe the process of policy implementation. Top-down implementation means carrying out a policy from the top, i.e., by the central government or legislature. The bottom-up approach suggests that the implementation should start with the target group, as they are seen as the actual implementers of policy.

==== Evaluation ====
Evaluation is the process of assessing the extent to which the policy has been successful, or if this was the right policy to begin with/ was it implemented correctly, and if so, did it go as expected.

==== Policy maintenance ====
Maintenance is the stage at which policymakers decide whether to terminate or continue the policy. The policy is usually either continued as is, modified, or discontinued.

==== Composition ====
Unless discontinued, this cycle will return to the agenda-setting phase. However, the policy cycle is illustrated in a chronological, cyclical structure, which could be misleading, as policymaking in actuality involves overlapping stages and multiple interactions among policy proposals, adjustments, and decision-making across multiple government institutions and their respective authoritative actors. Likewise, although its heuristic model is straightforward to understand, the cycle is not totally applicable in all situations of policymaking due to it being far too simple as there are more crucial steps that should go into more complex real life scenarios.

==== Criticism of the "policy studies" approach ====
The mainstream tradition of policy studies has been criticized for oversimplifying the processes of public policy, particularly in its use of models based on rational choice theory, failing to capture current dynamics in today's society, and sustaining ambiguities and misunderstandings. In contrast, an anthropological approach to studying public policy deconstructs many of the categories and concepts currently used, seeking to gain a deeper understanding of the configurations of actors, activities, and influences that shape policy decisions, implementation, and outcomes.

=== Responsibility of policymakers ===
Each system is influenced by different public problems and issues, and has different stakeholders; as such, each requires different public policy.

In public policy making, numerous individuals, corporations, non-profit organizations, and interest groups compete and collaborate to influence policymakers to act in a particular way. Therefore, "the failure [of public policies] is possibly not only the politician's fault because he/she is never the lone player in the field of decision making. There is a multitude of actors pursuing their goals, sometimes complementary, often competing or contradictory ones." In this sense, public policies can be the result of actors involved, such as interest organizations, and not necessarily the will of the public. Furthermore, public policy is also affected by social and economic conditions, prevailing political values, the publics mood and the structure of government which all play a role in the complexity of public policymaking.

The large set of actors in the public policy process, such as politicians, civil servants, lobbyists, domain experts, and industry or sector representatives, use a variety of tactics and tools to advance their aims, including advocating their positions publicly, attempting to educate supporters and opponents, and mobilizing allies on a particular issue. The use of effective tools and instruments determines the outcome of a policy.

Many actors play important roles in the public policy process, but government officials ultimately choose public policy in response to the issue or problem at hand. In doing so, government officials are expected to meet public sector ethics and take the needs of all project stakeholders into account.

It is, however, worth noting that what public policy is put forward can be influenced by the political stance of the party in power. After the 2008 financial crisis, David Cameron's Conservative Party sought to implement austerity in 2010, following its general election victory that year, to shore up the economy and reduce the UK's national debt. Whilst the Conservatives saw reducing the national debt as an absolute priority, the Labour Party, since the effects of Conservative austerity became apparent, have slated the policy for its 'needless' pressure on the working classes and those reliant on welfare, their 2019 election manifesto stating "Tory cuts [have] pushed our public services to breaking point" and that "the Conservatives have starved our education system of funding". Furthermore, in the US, Members of Congress have observed that partisan rancour, ideological disputes, and decreased willingness to compromise on policies have made policy making far more difficult than it was only a decade ago. These are good examples of how varying political beliefs can impact what is perceived as paramount for the electorate.

Since societies have changed in the past decades, the public policymaking system has changed too. In the 2010s, public policymaking is increasingly goal-oriented, aiming for measurable results, and decision-centric, focusing on decisions that must be made immediately.

Furthermore, mass communication and technological changes, such as the widespread availability of the Internet, have made the public policy system more complex and interconnected. This is because there is a new level of scrutiny which the 'tabloid society' provides of the decisions made by politicians and policy makers, often concentrating on the 'people story' side of these decisions. The changes pose new challenges to the current public policy systems and pressures leaders to evolve to remain effective and efficient.

Public policies come from all governmental entities and at all levels: legislatures, courts, bureaucratic agencies, and executive offices at national, local, and state levels. On the federal level, public policies are laws enacted by Congress, executive orders issued by the president, decisions handed down by the US Supreme Court, and regulations issued by bureaucratic agencies.

On the local level, public policies include city ordinances, fire codes, and traffic regulations. They also take the form of written rules and regulations of city government departments: the police, fire, street repair, or building inspection. On the state level, public policies involve laws enacted by the state legislatures, decisions made by state courts, rules developed by state bureaucratic agencies, and decisions made by governors.

== Policy analysis ==
In the contemporary era, there has been a massive influx of policy analysis. However, there is no evidence to suggest that this influx has helped solve policy issues. Distributive theory claims that, in reality, legislatures have little use for information about the policies they vote on.

It has been determined that, rather than certain fields having a higher concentration of information and analysis, the focus is on competitive issues. The same report from which this was determined also reported that information and analysis only seemed to affect issues over a long-term period and thus were ineffective at reactionary action.

== Policy design ==
Policy design entails a conscious and deliberate effort to define policy aims and map them instrumentally. Policy design proposes a critical analysis of policy instruments and their implementation. Uncertainties policy designers face include (in brief):

- Technical difficulties: mechanism, design, constituency, environment of public policies
- Cost issues: resources, materials, products, etc.
- Political problems: selection process of solutions and decision-making. Policies require rigorous, time-consuming research to assess the feasibility, legitimacy, and appropriateness of the advice they provide.
- Compliance: Understanding the target market and discovering data for those dependent, disadvantaged, or deviant on policy change.
- Effectiveness: There is a possibility of spillovers, complementariness and inconsistencies.

=== Data-driven policy ===
Data-driven policy is a policy designed by a government based on existing data, evidence, rational analysis and use of information technology to crystallize problems and highlight effective solutions. Data-driven policy making aims to make use of data and collaborate with citizens to co-create policy. Policy makers can now make use of new data sources and technological developments like Artificial Intelligence to gain new insights and make policy decisions which contribute to societal development.

In the 2020s, policymakers will use data to inform policy and public service design while responding to demands for citizen engagement. The Anticipatory Governance model is particularly important given the sheer volume of available data. In terms of using new technology to collect, analyze, and disseminate data, governments are only just beginning to utilize data science for policy implementation. With new technologies implemented in government administration, a more complete visualization of current problems will emerge, allowing for more precision in targeted policymaking. Data science involves the transformation, analysis, visualization, and presentation of data, and potentially improve the quality of life and society by providing a more informational environment for public debate and political decision-making. Some examples of using data science in public policymaking include optimizing resources, improving public services, and mitigating fraud and errors.

Data sets rarely merge between government agencies, within agencies, or across countries' governments. This is beginning to change with the COVID-19 pandemic spreading globally in early 2020. Forecasting and creating data models to prevent the propagation of the virus has become a vital approach for policymakers in governments around the world.

=== User-centered policy design ===
User-centered policies are policies that are designed and implemented with the end-users, or those who are impacted by the policy, as co-designers. Policymakers using this design process utilize users' knowledge of their lived experiences. This can allow policymakers to focus on including both comprehensiveness and comprehension within policies to aid in clarity for end-users, such as workers or organizations.

=== Small system dynamics model ===
The small system dynamics model is a method of condensing and simplifying the understanding of complex issues related to overall productivity.

=== Evidence-based policy ===
Evidence-based policy is associated with Adrian Smith because in his 1996 presidential address to the Royal Statistical Society, Smith questioned the current process of policy making and urged for a more "evidence-based approach" commenting that it has "valuable lessons to offer".

Some policy scholars now avoid using the term evidence-based policy, opting for terms such as evidence-informed. This language shift allows continued thinking about the underlying desire to improve evidence use in terms of its rigor or quality, while avoiding some of the key limitations or reductionist ideas at times seen with the evidence-based language. Still, the language of evidence-based policy is widely used and, as such, can be interpreted to reflect a desire for evidence to be used well or appropriately in one way or another – such as by ensuring systematic consideration of rigorous and high quality policy relevant evidence, or by avoiding biased and erroneous applications of evidence for political ends.

The development and analysis of evidence-based / evidence-informed policy are supported by multidisciplinary public policy research and policy analysis.

==== In the U.S. ====
Unlike the UK, the U.S. has a largely devolved government, with power at the local, state, and federal levels. Due to these various levels of governance, it can be difficult to coordinate the passage of bills and legislation, and disagreements often arise. Despite this, the system allows citizens to be relatively involved in the legislative process. Furthermore, each level of government is structured similarly, with similar rules, and all pump money into creating what is hoped to be effective legislation. Policy creation in America is often seen as unique to other countries.

== Academic discipline ==
As an academic discipline, public policy brings in elements of many social science fields and concepts, including economics, sociology, political economy, social policy, program evaluation, policy analysis, and public management, all as applied to problems of governmental administration, management, and operations. At the same time, the study of public policy is distinct from political science or economics, in its focus on the application of theory to practice. While the majority of public policy degrees are master's and doctoral degrees, several universities offer undergraduate programs in public policy. Notable institutions include:

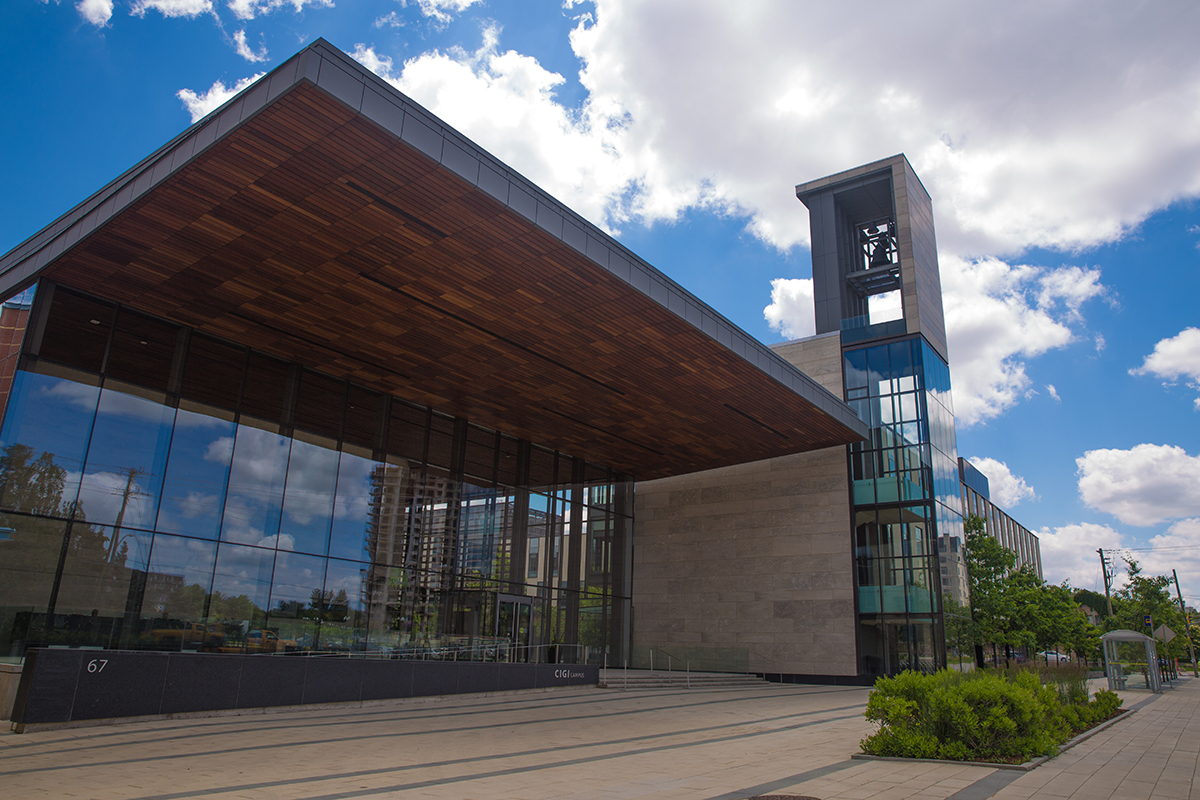
CIGI Campus, home to the Balsillie School of International Affairs

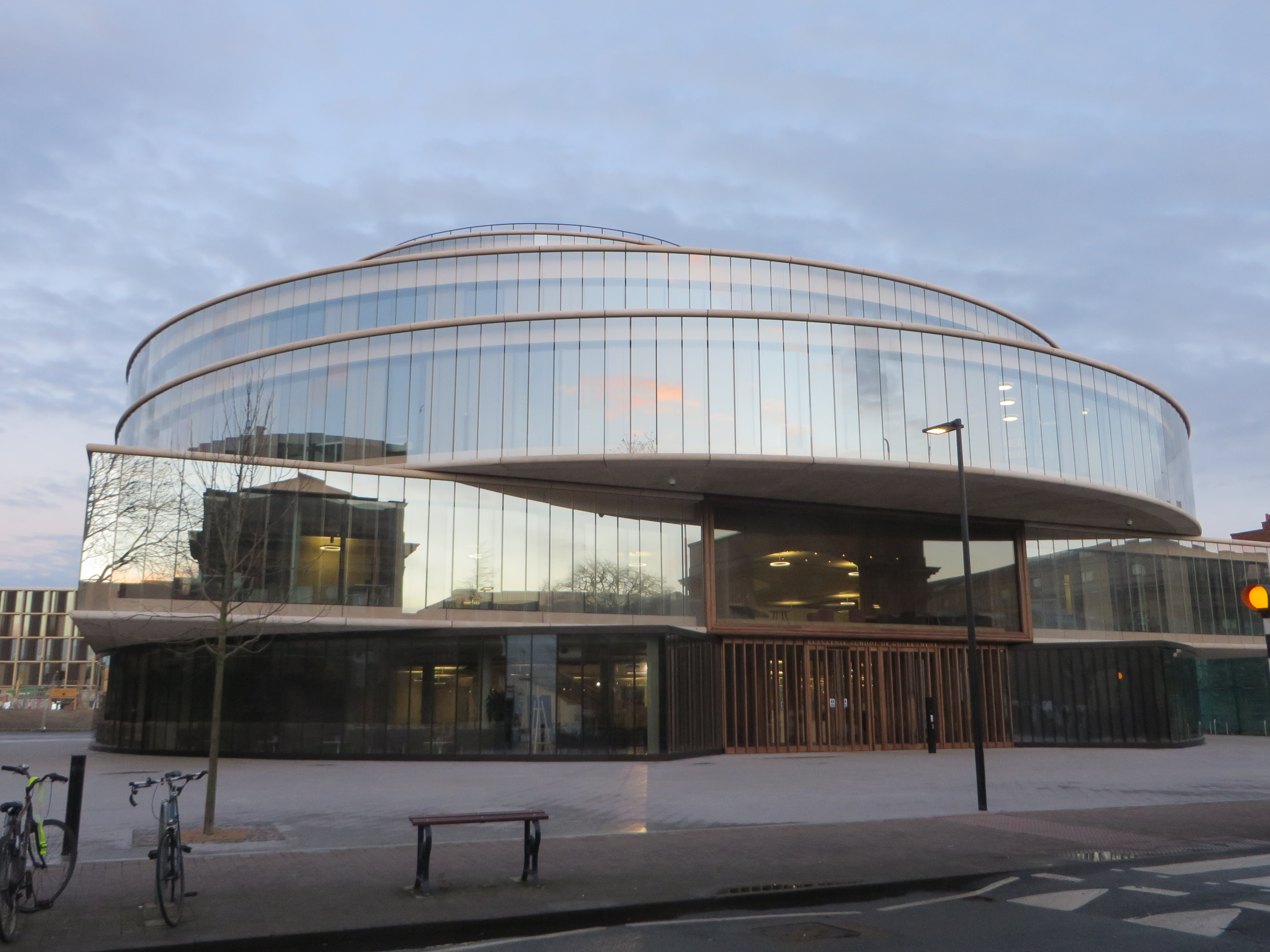
The Blavatnik School of Government building on Walton Street

- Balsillie School of International Affairs
- Blavatnik School of Government
- Durham University
- Lee Kuan Yew School of Public Policy, NUS
- Leiden University
- Hertie School, Berlin
- Graduate Institute of International and Development Studies, Geneva
- John F. Kennedy School of Government, Harvard
- Lyndon B. Johnson School of Public Affairs, The University of Texas at Austin
- London School of Economics
- Sciences Po, Paris
- National Defence University, Pakistan
- Jamia Hamdard

Traditionally, the academic field of public policy focused on domestic policy. However, the wave of economic globalization that occurred in the late 20th and early 21st centuries created a need for a subset of public policy that focused on global governance, especially as it relates to issues that transcend national borders such as climate change, terrorism, nuclear proliferation, and economic development. Consequently, many traditional public policy schools had to adjust their curricula to suit this new policy landscape, as well as develop entirely new curricula altogether.

== Controversies ==
The Austrian and Chicago school of economics criticise public policymakers for not "understanding basic economics". In particular, Thomas Sowell, a member of the Chicago school of economics, writes that "Under popularly elected government, the political incentives are to do what is popular, even if the consequences are worse than the consequences of doing nothing, or doing something that is less popular". Therefore, since "Economics studies the consequences of decisions that are made about the use of land, labour, capital and other resources that go into producing the volume of output which determines a country's standard of living", this means that artificially tampering with the allocation of scarce resources by implementing certain public policies such as price controls will cause inefficiency in the economy and decline in the standard of living within society.

One of the biggest controversies in public policy is that policymaking is often influenced by lobbyists, such as those from big corporations, to sway policies in their favour. For example, the National Rifle Association of America (NRA) is an organisation that lobbies United States lawmakers to oppose stricter gun laws.

International policy frameworks such as the United Nations are unable to enforce legally binding agreements on nations. The Declaration on the Granting of Independence to Colonial Countries and Peoples was implemented in 1960 to decolonise the areas colonised by the colonial powers of the 20th century. However, colonial territories persist despite the General Assembly's attempts to compel countries to return land.

Another controversy surrounding public policy is that individuals, including policymakers, hold biases and may seek out facts that confirm their preconceptions. A study of Danish politicians published in the British Journal of Political Science found that its subjects' preconceptions affected how they viewed data.

== See also ==
- Advocacy
- Advocacy evaluation
- Artificial intelligence in government
- Eightfold path (policy analysis)
- Harold Lasswell
- List of public policy topics by country
- List of public administration schools
- Mandate (politics)
- Overton window
- Policy
- Policy analysis
- Public comment
- Public criminology
- Public policy school
- Social policy
