= South Asian foreign policy of the Obama administration =

Aspect of U.S. foreign policy from 2009 to 2017

For purposes of U.S. foreign policy, South Asia consists of Bangladesh, Bhutan, India, the Maldives, Nepal, Pakistan, and Sri Lanka. The assistant secretary of State for South and Central Asian affairs was Nisha Desai Biswal.

== History ==
=== Background ===
The Obama administration's South Asian foreign policy was outlined, in part, in "The Obama Administration's Policy on South Asia" by Robert O. Blake Jr., Assistant Secretary of State for the Bureau of South and Central Asian Affairs who wrote "[o]ur goal was and remains to support the development of sovereign, stable, democratic nations, integrated into the world economy and cooperating with one another, the United States, and our partners to advance regional security and stability." The interests of the United States and South Asia have converged. The US and South Asia are at a unique place in time and history for building and cementing strong ties between the South Asian nations and its peoples, and these two blocks are determined to do so. The region is now, and will long remain, at the forefront of America's foreign policy concerns. The United States is committed to help South Asia achieve the bright future that it deserves. The American Chamber of Commerce is an important partner that is helping to strengthen ties between the United States and South Asia. Through counting on the business community for leadership and insight, and South Asia's strong linkages with businesses in the United States and throughout the region, this relationship will deepen and broaden relations. The American Chamber of Commerce in South Asian countries is a vocal proponent of economic and political reform.

== Countries ==
=== Bangladesh ===
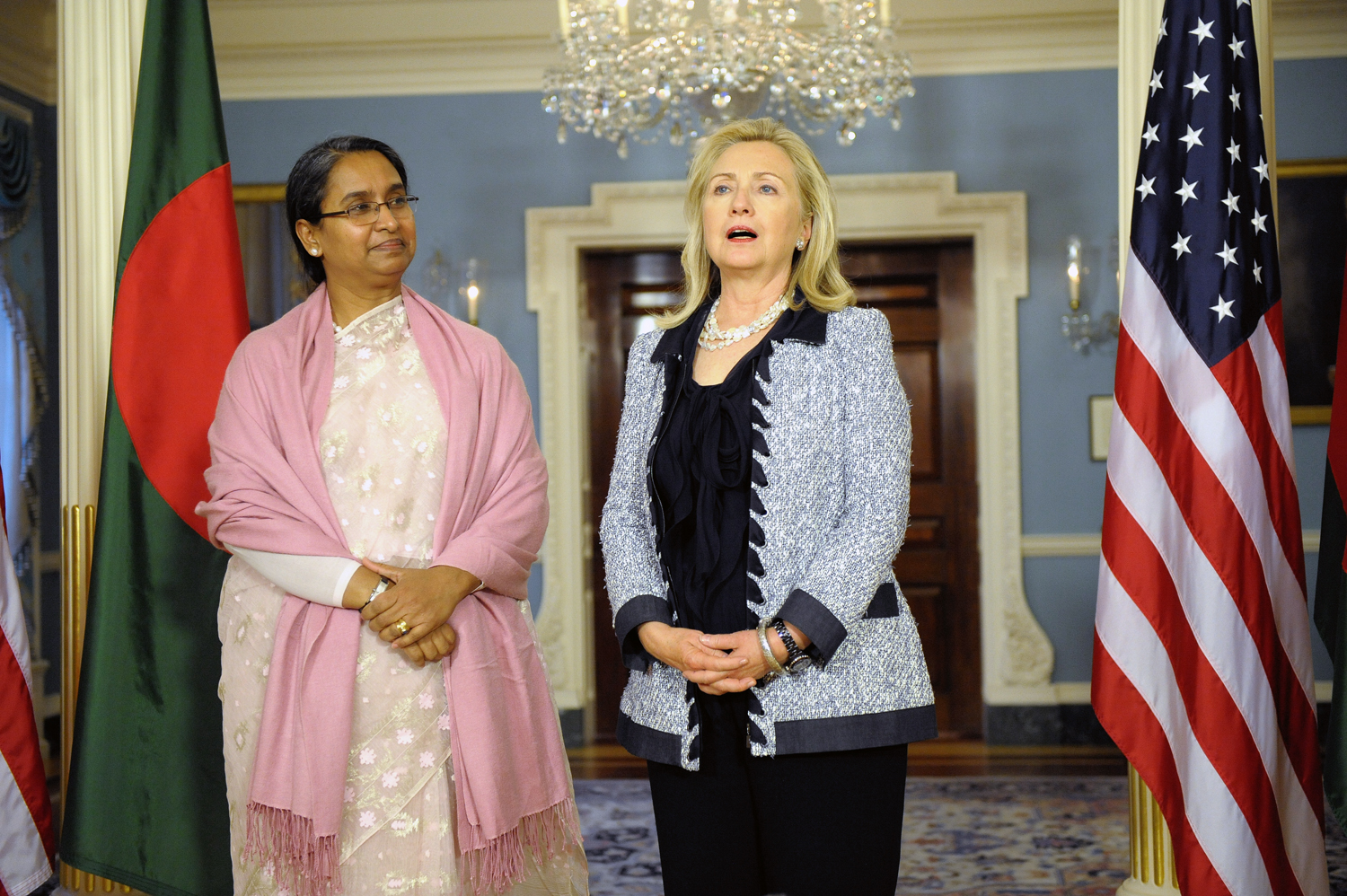
Bangladesh Minister of Foreign Affairs Dipu Moni and US Secretary of State Hillary Clinton at the State Department in 2011.

Bangladesh–U.S. relations under the Barack Obama Administration by most normal indicators, banks on a bright future. U.S. secretary of state Hillary Clinton said she was "betting on Bangladesh" when she visited Bangladesh in July 2012. In the last two decades, Bangladesh has made marked progress in the economic arena and in some key areas of development. Bangladesh has become agriculturally self-sufficient; dramatically reduced its birth rate; highly improved literacy rates; delivered basic social services to its people; and empowered women through employment and education. As the fourth most populous Muslim country in the world, Bangladesh's voice of moderation in regional and international fora is widely respected and appreciated. U.S.–Bangladesh relations were boosted in March 2000 when U.S. president Bill Clinton visited Bangladesh, the first-ever visit by a sitting U.S. president, then Secretary of State Colin Powell's visit in June 2003, and Secretary of Defense Donald Rumsfeld's visit in June 2004.

Relations between Bangladesh and the United States steadily strengthened by the participation of Bangladesh Armed Forces in the 1991 Gulf War coalition, and alongside U.S. forces in numerous UN peacekeeping operations, including Haiti in 1994, as well as assisting a U.S. Naval task force. Between 2005 and 2008, the United States obligated $5.2 million in grant aid funding (Foreign Military Financing) to purchase Defender class High Speed Motor boats, under water demolition training and diving equipment for the Bangladesh Coast Guard, and allocated $934,000 in IMET (International Military Education and Training) for 2007.

Additionally, Bangladesh has become a valuable United States ally in global efforts to control terrorism. As part of these efforts, the Government of Bangladesh has begun to address problems of money laundering and weak border controls to ensure that Bangladesh does not become a terrorist safe-haven. Despite porous borders, ungoverned spaces, and poor service delivery, Bangladesh's strong national identity and moderate traditions help it serve as a key player in combating over the border extremism.

The two sides agreed to enhance partnership in UN Peacekeeping, counterterrorism and disaster management. The whole gamut of on-going security cooperation between the two countries in counterterrorism, disaster management, maritime security and peacekeeping operations, and shared commitment to peace, security and prosperity in the region, are consistent.

A press release of the US Embassy in Dhaka said the positive and substantial work on the exchanges and dialogues reflected the depth and strength of the bilateral defense relationship as well as shared commitment to peace and prosperity in the region. Both nations maintain Defense Attache Wings of the host embassy's. In It said: "This Significant Dialogue on Security Issues highlights the robust engagement between the United States and Bangladesh as well as our growing defense relationship." Describing Bangladesh as an important partner of the US in dealing with many traditional and non-traditional security issues, Andrew Shapiro stressed the strategic importance of Bangladesh in the broader U.S. economic and security interest.

Apart from U.S.–Bangladesh partnership in the much talked about global war on terror, as are its other South Asian neighbors, a deeper degree of bilateral security cooperation has been ongoing behind closed doors. This dialogue transcended bilateralism and Bangladesh has been officially taken on in a U.S.- South Asian security loop. On March 2, 2012, head of U.S. Pacific Command Admiral Robert Willard visited Bangladesh, and later said at a Congressional hearing that U.S. Special Forces teams were currently stationed in this South Asian country for tactical training purposes—Bangladesh—as part of the counter-terrorism cooperation with that nation. "South Asia is home to a confluence of challenges, including nuclear armed rivals India and Pakistan. In Bangladesh's case, numerous transnational VEOs such as the Indian Lashkar-e-Toiba, piracy, over the border trafficking in narcotics and persons, disputed borders with India, and Bangladesh border being a sensitive one because of the insurgent movements that have plagued India.

The U.S. understands the potential of Bangladesh as the seventh largest populous (Muslim majority) country in the world; secondly, the U.S. sees the country emerging as the next "Tiger in Asia" provided it remains politically stable; and also the US values Bangladesh for its geo-political importance. Bangladesh is the bridgehead between South and Southeast Asia, with a close border to China and a littoral state of Indian Ocean with two seaports of high potential at Mongla and Chittagong. The U.S. Ambassador in Bangladesh Dan Mozena has been consistently upbeat in his remarks about Bangladesh when he remarked, "Indeed, we have moved a long way ahead since Henry Kissinger's labeling of Bangladesh as a basket case in the early 70s", in resonance with the political and economic situation of the time.

That the United States is attaching increasing importance to her relationship with Bangladesh has been illustrated by a flurry of visits by U.S. dignitaries to Dhaka in the year 2012. They included U.S. assistant secretary of state for South and Central Asian affairs Robert O. Blake Jr., Under Secretary of State for Political Affairs Wendy R. Sherman and Assistant Secretary of State for Political-Military Affairs Andrew J. Shapiro. All this was followed by the visit of the highest U.S. defense official, Secretary of the Navy Ray Mabus, between July 13 and 15. Cooperation between the navies of the two countries began with discussions at length. The series of inter-state contacts climaxed with the visit of U.S. secretary of state Hillary Clinton signing up to Bangladesh-U.S. Partnership Dialogue Framework. The maiden annual meeting under the framework is likely to be held in September 2012.

Nilanthi Samaranayake, Strategic Studies Analyst at CNA in Alexandria, VA, writing for Asia-Pacific Bulletin (Sept 22, 2011), East-West Center underscored: "The prospects for advancing U.S. security ties with Bangladesh and Sri Lanka deserve serious examination." The reasons for such a shift of emphasis can be ticked off in the following order: While relations with India "may not progress as quickly as desired" and those with Pakistan and Afghanistan are "in tatters," the United States needs to forge deeper strategic relationship with the "marginal states." Such states," according to Doug Lieb in the Harvard International Review, "are often overlooked in a structural realist world view that privileges the study of larger countries." Bangladesh and Sri Lanka being maritime countries exude significant potential for securing Indian Ocean sea lanes in the eyes of China and United States, of course with implications independent of India.

Today Bangladesh exports stand at US$25 billion worth of goods worldwide and is expected to increase rapidly with infrastructure development, political stability and sound governance. At $1.8 billion, the United States is Bangladesh’s biggest foreign investor, but new foreign investment is going down, not up. Privatization, export diversification, deregulation, financial sector reform, and major infrastructure investments are essential to reverse the declining foreign investment trends and achieve steady economic growth. The key factor stemming from Bangladesh's international relations

=== India ===
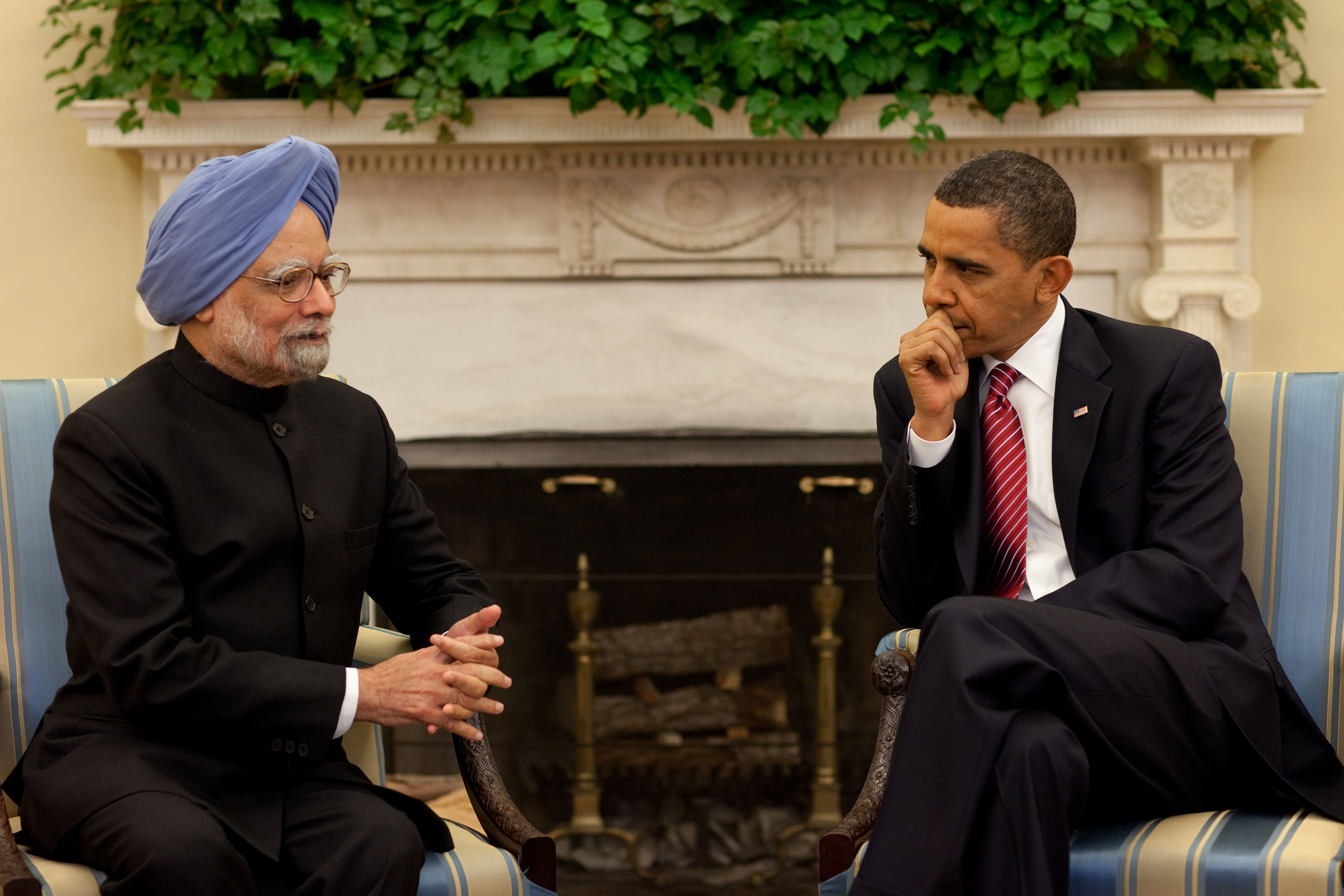
Obama and Indian Prime Minister Manmohan Singh, November 2009.

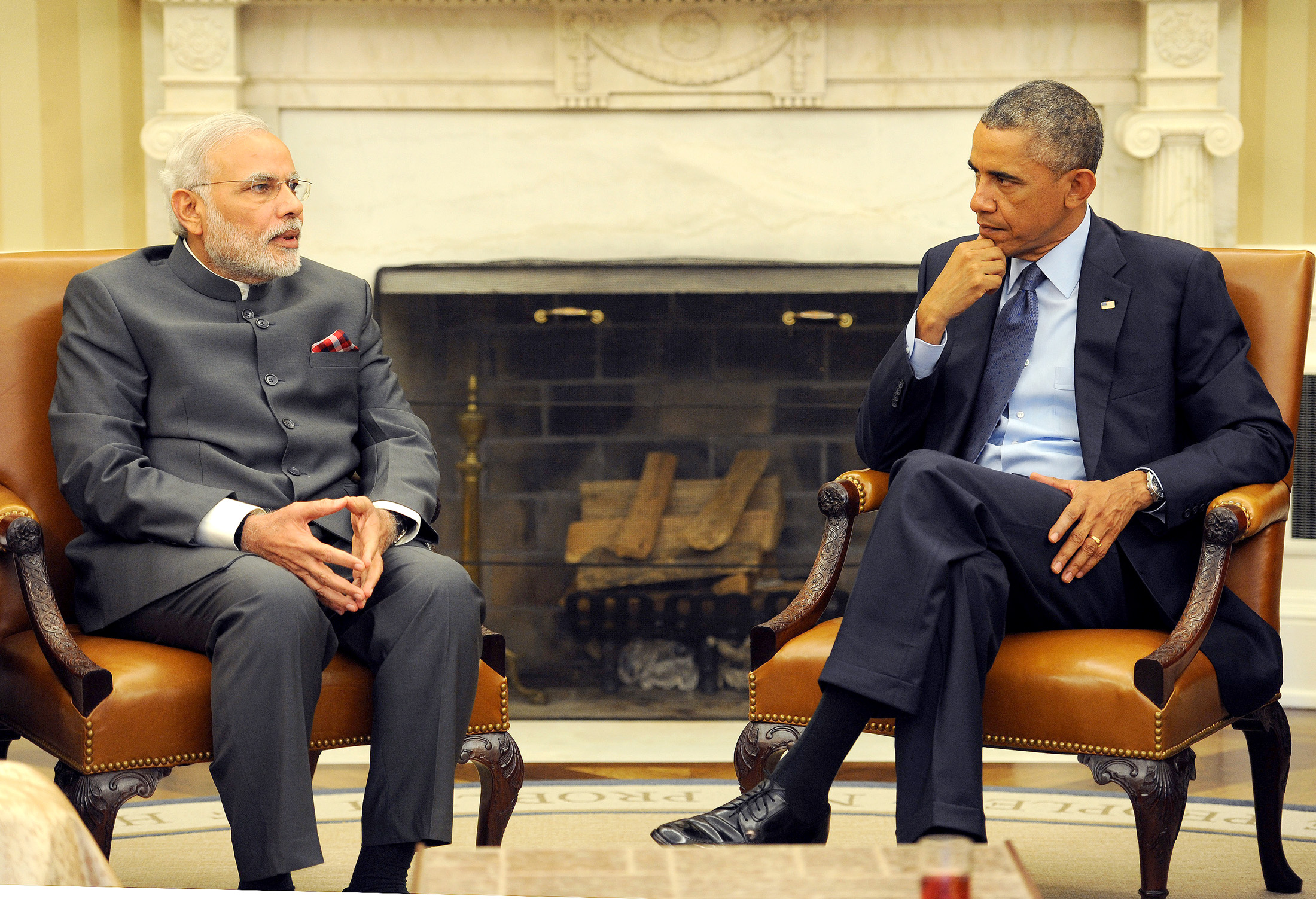
Obama and Indian Prime Minister Narendra Modi, September 2014.

India was not one of the countries the new secretary of state Hillary Clinton visited on her first multi-nation visit to Japan, Indonesia, South Korea and China in February 2009. The Foreign Policy magazine reported that even though Foreign Policy Staff of the Bush administration had recommended India as a "key stop" during any such official tour of Asia, Clinton decided not to visit New Delhi.

We want to build a future in which India is indispensable

— Barack Obama

The exclusion of India from the Asian tour was regarded as a "mistake" by several analysts. Analysts also noted that India was not even mentioned once in the Obama administration's official foreign policy agenda. Tunku Varadarajan an Indian columnist in Forbes magazines, alerted Obama on the need to prevent United States' new-found alliance with India from erosion. In an editorial, The National Interest suggested that the Obama administration could possibly damage "the foundations underlying the geostrategic partnership" between India and the United States. Another editorial published by the Taipei Times highlighted the importance of India-U.S. relations and urged Obama to give "India the attention it deserves". Terming India to be the United States' "indispensable ally", the Christian Science Monitor argued that the Obama administration needs India's cooperation on several issues, including climate change, the war in Afghanistan and energy security; therefore, the editorial said, Obama cannot risk putting ties with India on "back-burner".

CIA Director Leon Panetta visited India to discuss a host of issues including common strategy on dealing with Islamic extremism and the Taliban. This was his first international visit since he assumed office in February 2009. However, there were signs of new coldness in India-U.S. relations. India's National Security Adviser, M.K. Narayanan, criticized the Obama administration for linking the Kashmir dispute to the instability in Pakistan and Afghanistan and said that by doing so, Obama was "barking up the wrong tree". The Foreign Policy too criticized Obama's approach towards South Asia, saying that "India can be a part of the solution rather than part of the problem" and suggested India to take a more proactive role in rebuilding Afghanistan irrespective of the attitude of the Obama administration. In a clear indication of growing rift between India and the U.S., the former decided not to accept a U.S. invitation to attend a conference on Afghanistan. Bloomberg reported that since 2008 Mumbai attacks, the public mood in India has been to pressure Pakistan more aggressively to take actions against the culprits behind the attack. Consequently, the Obama administration may find itself at odds with India's rigid stance against non-state terrorism. The Times of India reported that because of increasing concerns over the possibility of the United States agreeing to a Pakistan-assisted scheme to put some "moderate" elements of Taliban in charge of governing Afghanistan, India was carrying out discussions with Iran and Russia, on the sidelines of the Shanghai Cooperation Organisation, to devise a strategy to "roundly defeat" the Taliban.

Ties between India and the United States have soured on the economic front too. India criticized the Obama administration's decision to limit H-1B visas and India's External Affairs Minister, Pranab Mukherjee, said that his country would argue against U.S. "protectionism" at various international fora. The Vishwa Hindu Parishad, a close aide of India's main opposition party, the Bharatiya Janata Party (BJP), said that if the United States continues with its anti-outsourcing policies, then India will "have to take steps to hurt American companies in India." India's Commerce Minister, Kamal Nath, said that India may move against Obama's outsourcing policies at the World Trade Organization. However, the outsourcing advisory head of KPMG said that India had no reason to worry since Obama's statements were directed against "outsourcing being carried out by manufacturing companies" and not outsourcing of IT-related services.

In March 2009, the Obama administration cleared the US$2.1 billion sale of eight P-8 Poseidons to India, the largest military deal between the two countries. The Obama administration temporarily halted work on General Electric LM2500 gas turbine engines which were to be fitted in Indian Navy's Shivalik class frigates. On March 24, 2009, the Indian Navy reported that the U.S. government had ordered GE to resume work on the turbine engines.

India’s growing role in the global economy is accepted the way we accept the law of gravity. And the partnerships that are blooming at all levels of our societies are indeed exciting.

— Hillary Clinton, United States Secretary of State

The White House congratulated India on the successful conclusion of the Indian general election in May 2009. On May 23, 2009, Obama hailed the election as "a testament to the strength of India's democracy". In a press release by the White House, it was announced that Timothy J. Roemer was named the next U.S. ambassador to India. The nomination of Roemer, a non-proliferation expert, led to mixed reactions from the South Asian experts and community advocates. Roemer has previously stated that, "We also must address the tension between Pakistan and India over Kashmir. For generations, this issue has fueled extremism and served as a central source of friction between two nuclear states. Resolving this dispute would allow them to focus more on sustainable development and less on armed conflict." We need to harness the energy of the international community to resolve security issues in the (South Asia) region."

The first official state dinner of Barack Obama's administration was held in honor of Indian Prime Minister Manmohan Singh, who visited the United States on November 24, 2009. This official state visit followed a visit to India by Secretary of State Hillary Clinton in July.

President Obama became the first US president to be the chief guest of India's Republic Day celebrations of India held on 26 January 2015. India and the US held their first ever bilateral dialogue on the UN and multilateral issues in the spirit of the "Delhi Declaration of Friendship" that strengthens and expands the two countries' relationship as part of the Post-2015 Development Agenda.

=== Pakistan ===
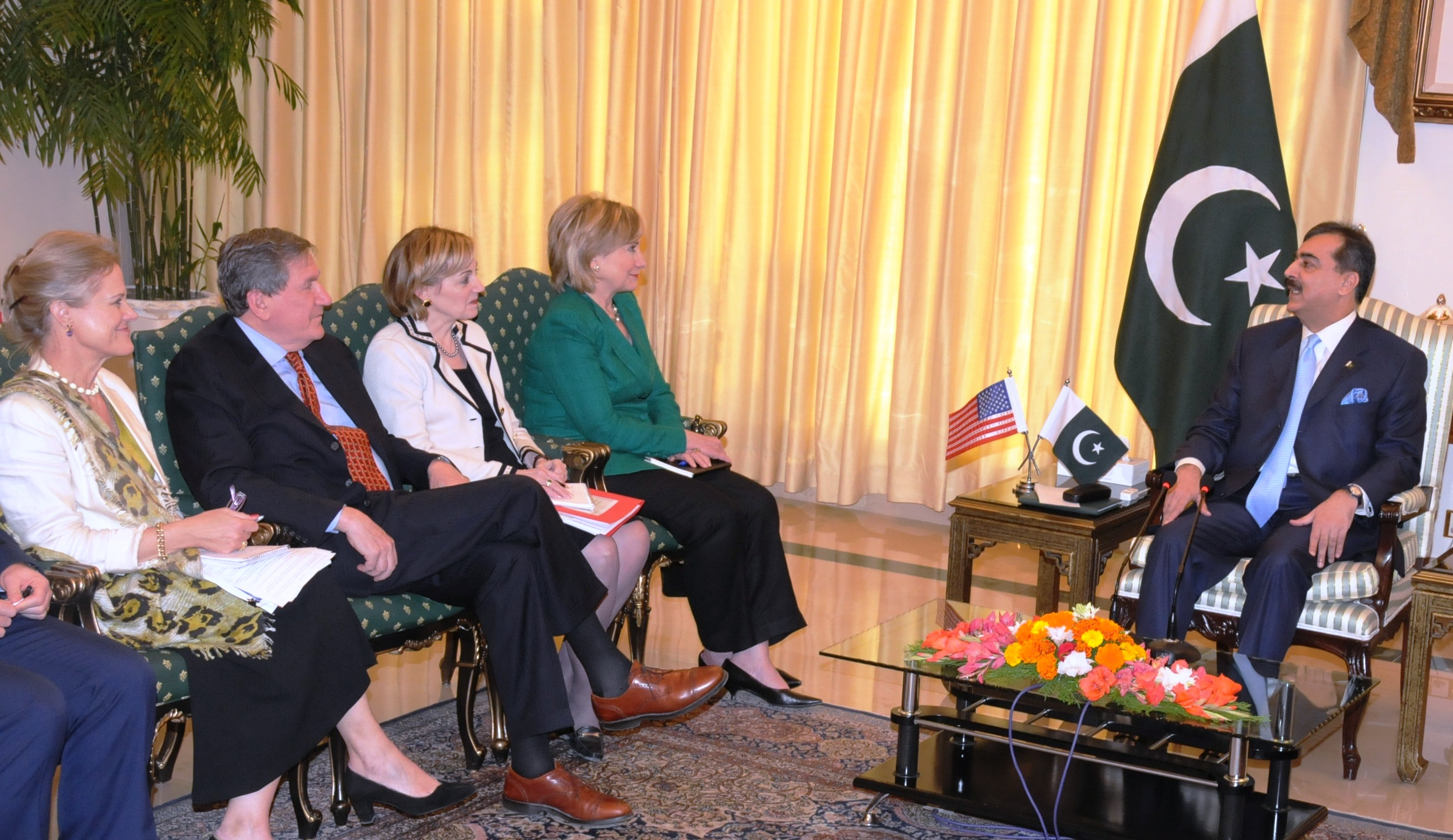
Clinton with Pakistani prime minister Yousaf Raza Gillani during an October 2009 visit to Islamabad.

As a presidential candidate, Obama was noted for his tough stance on Pakistan. "If the United States has al Qaeda, bin Laden, top-level lieutenants in our sights, and Pakistan is unable or unwilling to act, then we should take them out," Obama asserted at a September 26, 2008, presidential debate with John McCain. The Republican candidate responded, "You don’t say that out loud. If you have to do things, you have to do things, and you work with the Pakistani government."

Since Obama took office, U.S. foreign policy toward Pakistan has deviated little from that of the Bush administration, with Central Intelligence Agency Director Leon Panetta hailing the former administration's strategy of using unmanned aerial vehicles to strike at al Qaeda and Taliban bases within Pakistan and Obama ordering the expansion of airstrikes to include the organization of Baitullah Mehsud, the militant chief reportedly behind the 2007 assassination of Benazir Bhutto, as priority targets. In response to a ceasefire agreement between Islamabad and the Pakistani Taliban establishing sharia law in the Swat Valley of Pakistan, the Obama administration has adopted a 'wait and watch' policy, with Admiral Mike Mullen stating a continued need for intercommunication and cross-cultural understanding between the U.S. and Pakistan. He also has ordained a common geo-strategical approach towards Afghanistan and Pakistan, a policy known as "AfPak".

Monday 9 February 2009: report by The Guardian said by an American general that "Pakistan, not Iraq, Afghanistan or Iran, is the most urgent foreign policy issue facing Obama", furthermore by Obama aide saying that nation that 'scares' them; because of the situation that it faces and how it affect U.S. foreign policy.

While Pakistani Foreign Minister Shah Mehmood Qureshi praised the Obama administration as "really willing to listen to us" during three-party talks with Afghan and American officials in February concerning the war on terrorism, the Pakistani government also adopted a new proposal asking the U.S. to turn over aerial attack drones to Islamabad to allow the Pakistani Air Force to continue anti-militant airstrikes in the North-West Frontier Province and Federally Administered Tribal Areas on the Afghan border. White House Press Secretary Robert Gibbs declined to comment on the request.

On February 27, 2009, Obama gave an interview to Jim Lehrer in which he said, "Obviously, we haven't been thinking regionally, recognizing that Afghanistan is actually an Afghanistan/Pakistan problem."

Later in May, the U.S., in an effort to strengthen trust with Pakistan, said they would start 'sharing drone surveillance data with Pakistan, says Mike Mullen (U.S. general) '

In late October 2009, Secretary of State Hillary Clinton visited Pakistan. Her talks with the government there were aimed at getting direct, open discussions going regarding the level of Pakistan's efforts in fighting terrorism, al Qaeda and al Qaeda sanctuaries. Furthermore, in a speech in Pakistan capital Islamabad, she 'vowed' support Pakistan military efforts against the militants and that the U.S. would continue to support Pakistan; she also said 'These extremists are committed to destroying that which is dear to us, as much as they are committed to destroying that which is dear to you, and to all people, ... So this is our struggle as well, and we commend the Pakistani military for their courageous fight, and we commit to stand shoulder to shoulder with the Pakistani people in your fight for peace and security."

On December 1, 2009, President Obama in a speech on a policy about Pakistan said 'In the past, we too often defined our relationship with Pakistan narrowly. Those days are over ... The Pakistani people must know America will remain a strong supporter of Pakistan’s security and prosperity long after the guns have fallen silent, so that the great potential of its people can be unleashed'.

In October, U.S. Congress approves $7.5 billion non-military aid package to Pakistan over the next 5 years. Then later in February 2010 Obama seeks to increase funds to Pakistan; these funds would 'promotes economic and political stability in strategically important regions where the United States has special security interests'. Obama also seeks $3.1 billions aid for Pakistan to defeat Al Qaeda in the 2010 fiscal year.

In February 2010, Anne W. Patterson (U.S. Ambassador to Pakistan) said that United States is committed to partnership with Pakistan and further said, "Making this commitment to Pakistan while the U.S. is still recovering from the effects of the global recession reflects the strength of our vision. Yet we have made this commitment, because we see the success of Pakistan, its economy, its civil society and its democratic institutions as important for ourselves, for this region and for the world."

In mid February, after the capture of Taliban No.2 leader Abdul Ghani Baradar in Pakistan, the White House 'hails capture of Taliban leader'. Furthermore, White House press secretary Robert Gibbs said that this is a "big success for our mutual efforts (Pakistan and United States) in the region" and He praised Pakistan for the capture, saying it is a sign of increased cooperation with the U.S. in the terror fight. Furthermore, Capt. John Kirby, spokesman for Adm. Mike Mullen, chairman of the Joint Chiefs of Staff, has said 'We also strongly support Pakistani efforts to secure the border region, Kirby added, noting that Pakistan has lost soldiers in that effort.' Mullen, (President Barack Obama's senior military adviser) has made strengthening 'U.S. military relationship with Pakistan a top priority'. The U.S. and Pakistan have a robust working relationship that serves the mutual interests of our people,' Kirby said. "We continue to build a long-term partnership that strengthens our common security and prosperity.".

==== Death of Osama bin Laden ====
President Obama's address (9:28) Also available: Audio only;

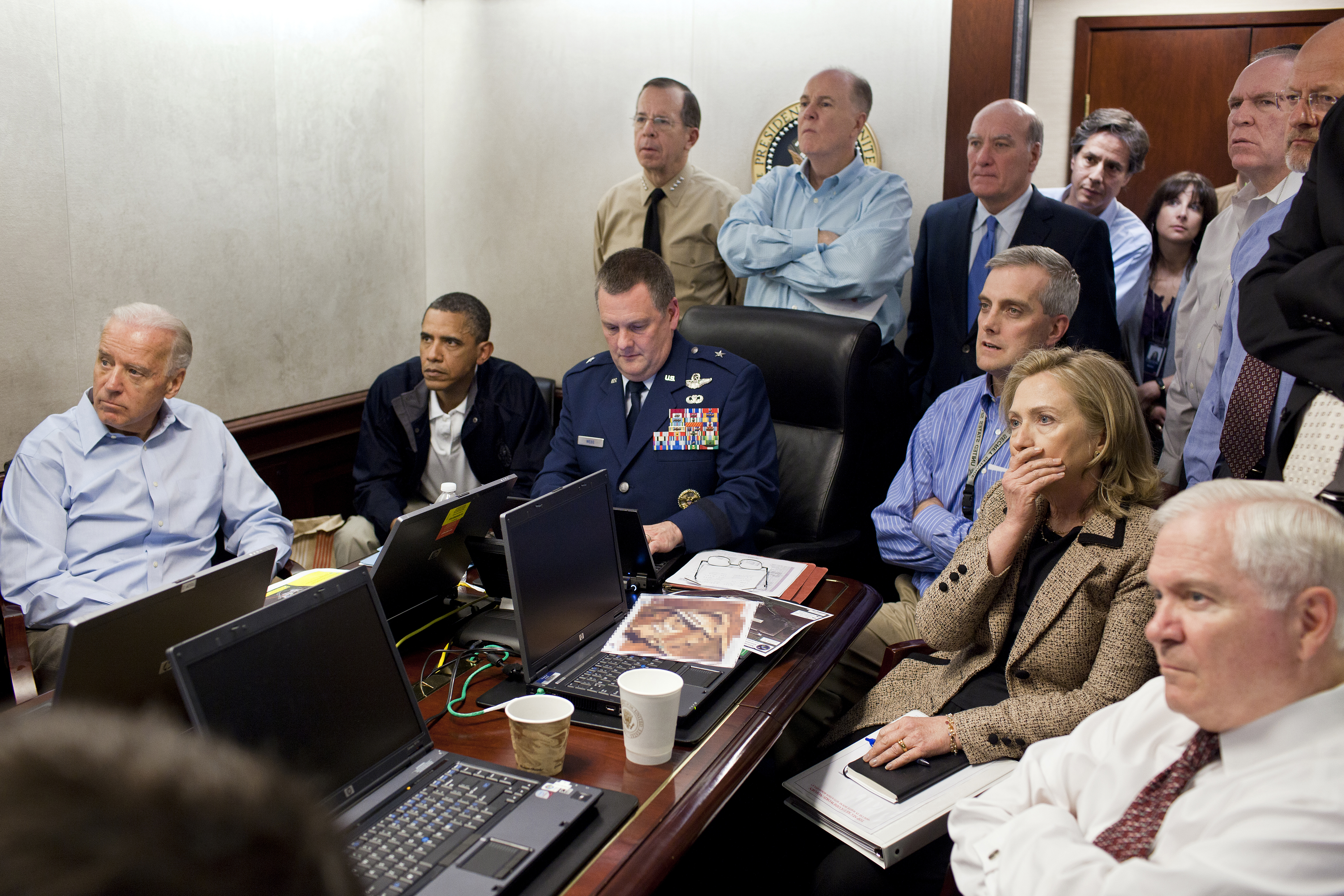
Obama and members of the national security team receive an update on Operation Neptune's Spear in the White House Situation Room, May 1, 2011. See also: Situation Room

Starting with information received from Central Intelligence Agency operatives in July 2010, the CIA developed intelligence over the next several months that determined what they believed to be the hideout of Osama bin Laden. He was living in seclusion in a large compound in Abbottabad, Pakistan, a suburban area 35 miles (56 km) from Islamabad. CIA head Leon Panetta reported this intelligence to President Obama in March 2011. Meeting with his national security advisers over the course of the next six weeks, Obama rejected a plan to bomb the compound, and authorized a "surgical raid" to be conducted by United States Navy SEALs. The operation took place on May 1, 2011, and resulted in the shooting death of bin Laden and the seizure of papers, computer drives and disks from the compound. DNA testing was one of five methods used to positively identify bin Laden's corpse, which was buried at sea several hours later. Within minutes of the President's announcement from Washington, DC, late in the evening on May 1, there were spontaneous celebrations around the country as crowds gathered outside the White House, and at New York City's Ground Zero and Times Square. Reaction to the announcement was positive across party lines, including from former presidents Bill Clinton and George W. Bush.

President Obama later announced the death of Osama Bin laden in his address to the nation from the White House stating "the United States has conducted an operation that killed Osama bin Laden, the leader of al Qaeda, and a terrorist who’s responsible for the murder of thousands of innocent men, women, and children. It was nearly 10 years ago that a bright September day was darkened by the worst attack on the American people in our history. The images of 9/11 are seared into our national memory"
