= Afghanistan-Pakistan Center of Excellence =

Think tank of the United States Central Command

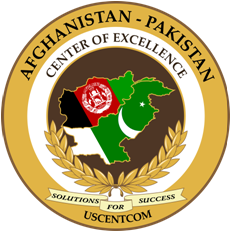
- Official Seal of the COE

Agency overview
- Formed: August 2009
- Headquarters: Tampa, Florida United States

The Afghanistan-Pakistan Center of Excellence (AFG-PAK COE) is an internal think tank at the United States Central Command focused on Afghanistan, Pakistan, and the Central Asian States. The AFG-PAK COE seeks to build expertise in and provide improved intelligence for the missions in those countries and the states around them. The AFG-PAK COE is planning to help expand the number of U.S. military and civilian experts on Afghanistan and Pakistan by providing them with education and training opportunities covering the culture, language, and region, and keeping these analysts and military forces connected to these missions in those countries when they are between deployments.

The COE is within the USCENTCOM Directorate of Intelligence. From 2009 - 2017(?), Derek Harvey, Senior Executive Service, led the organization as Director.

== In the news ==
After just over a year as an organization, the AFG-PAK COE won the Defense Intelligence Agency's Director's Annual Agency Team Award for its success in leading and focusing analysis efforts to support operations in Afghanistan, as well as Pakistan. The center has hosted a number of conferences, including a June 2010 conference called "The Art of the Possible in Afghanistan and Pakistan." The AF-PAK Center briefly changed its name to AF-PAK Central Asian States Center to include the Central Asian States. The center is currently being assimilated/reorganized into the USCENTCOM J2

In April 2013, the Director of National Intelligence, James R. Clapper, praised the AF-PAK Center for its detailed analytic work on the Osama bin Laden raid files.
