= European foreign policy of the Obama administration =

For purposes of U.S. foreign policy, Europe consists of the European Union and non-EU states in Europe.

President Barack Obama plans to increase American troops in Europe to their highest levels since 2003, and station more special operations aircraft and Aegis Ballistic Missile Defense System ships there to provide quick access to Africa and the Middle East.

== History ==
=== Background ===
In February and March 2009, Vice President Joe Biden and Secretary of State Hillary Clinton made separate overseas trips to announce a "new era" in U.S. foreign relations with Russia and Europe, using the terms "break" and "reset" to signal major changes from the policies of the preceding administration. Obama attempted to reach out to Arab leaders by granting his first interview to an Arab satellite TV network, Al Arabiya.

== Estonia ==
Estonia is and remains a small but important ally of the United States in Afghanistan. On June 16, 2009, President Obama and his National Security Advisor James Jones met the Estonian Head of State Toomas Hendrik Ilves, who was on a working visit to the United States of America, in Washington. The main issues that were discussed at the meeting in the White House included the global economic recession, trans-Atlantic relations, the transparency and credibility of NATO as an organization established to protect its allies, and the current situation in Afghanistan, the most important foreign mission of the alliance. President Ilves affirmed that while Estonia, like its allies, had suffered severe losses, they would go all the way and will not desert the mission in Afghanistan.

== Kosovo ==
The United States continued its policy of recognition of the Republic of Kosovo under the Obama administration. According to The Sofia Echo, in late February 2009, the Pristina daily newspaper Koha Ditore reported that Kosovan President Fatmir Sejdiu, Prime Minister Hashim Thaci, and Foreign Minister Skender Hyseni were personally assured by United States Secretary of State Hillary Clinton that the Obama administration would lobby internationally to expand diplomatic recognition of Kosovo, which declared independence from Serbia in 2008 and has been recognized by 56 countries as of March 2009.

== Italy ==
After World War II, Italy became a strong and active transatlantic partner of the United States. Under the Obama administration, the two countries developed a friendly and pragmatic relationship. However, the Obama administration's shift in priorities and approach altered the context in which Italian foreign policy was carried out. Italy faced new constraints as Obama's approach mixed US leadership with coordination, requiring European partners to communicate with Washington on national and transatlantic issues. President Barack Obama hosted the President of the Council of Ministers of the Italian Republic Enrico Letta at the White House on October 17, 2013. The visit highlighted the well built alliance between the United States and Italy.

== Russia ==
"In 2009, a great power does not show strength by dominating or demonizing other countries."

— Barack Obama, during his visit to Russia (July 2009).

In a speech on February 7, 2009, Vice President of the United States Joe Biden discussed a shift in U.S. policy towards Russia towards "co-operation and consultation" while National Security Advisor James L. Jones stated that U.S. foreign policy is undergoing "major policy reviews" and that "plans to put parts of the Pentagon's missile shield in Poland and the Czech Republic – a project that Moscow says could trigger a new arms race – were being put on ice and that talks on the shield would be broadened." Biden also stated that the "last few years have seen a dangerous drift in relations between Russia and our [NATO] alliance. It's time to press the reset button and to revisit the many areas where we can and should work together.".

Prior to this meeting the Russian government suspended its plan to place missiles on the Polish border near Kaliningrad in response to White House assurances that the Obama administration was reviewing the Bush administration's plans to deploy a missile defense shield in Poland and the Czech Republic.

Biden rejected the idea of a Russian "sphere of influence" during his speech, stating, "We will not agree with Russia on everything," and said, "For example, the United States will not recognize Abkhazia and South Ossetia as independent states" nor will we "recognize a sphere of influence. It will remain our view that sovereign states have the right to make their own decisions and choose their own alliances."

During his election campaign, Obama had stated that he intended to "work with Russia to take U.S. and Russian ballistic missiles off hair trigger alert [and] seek dramatic reductions in U.S. and Russian stockpiles of nuclear weapons and material." In February 2009, The Daily Telegraph reported that former Secretary of State Henry Kissinger had been in negotiation with Russian President Dmitry Medvedev on behalf of the Obama administration. Kissinger had reportedly been discussing reducing nuclear inventories to 1,000 warheads on each side, as part of a deal to replace the expiring START I arms limitation treaty.

On April 1, 2009, Obama and Medvedev met in London to discuss bilateral relations. In a joint statement, the two leaders said, "We ... are ready to move beyond Cold War mentalities and chart a fresh start in relations between our two countries." They stated a mutual goal of a "nuclear-free" world and committed to renegotiating their treaties on intercontinental ballistic missiles and nuclear armaments.

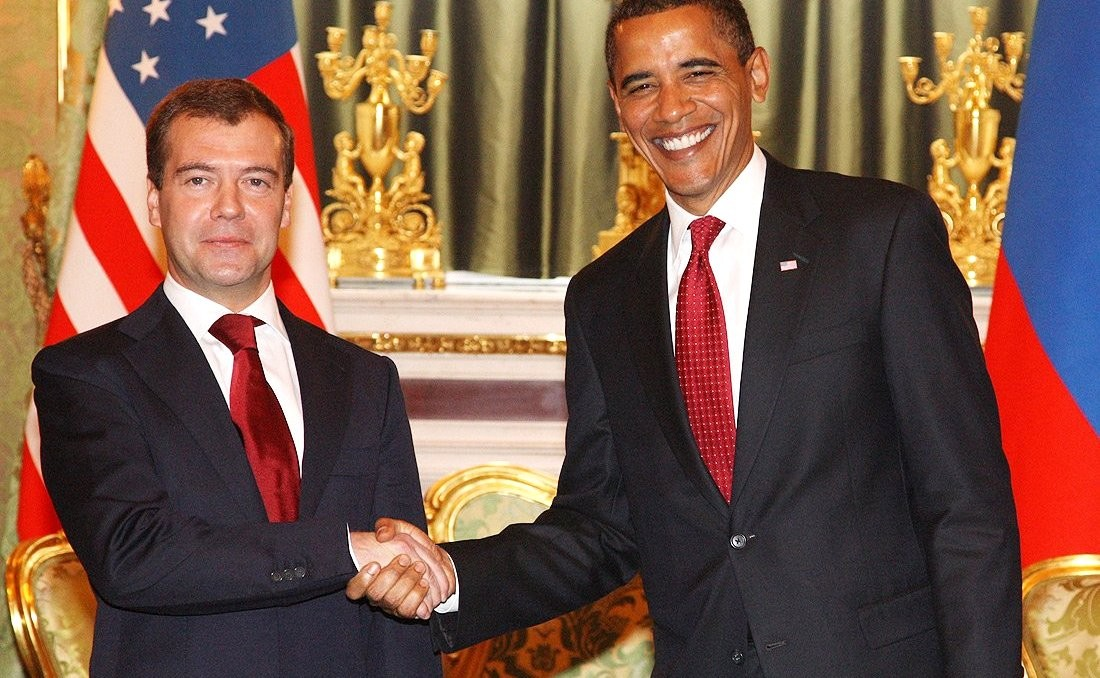
Presidents Obama and Medvedev during their July 6 meeting at the Kremlin in Moscow

On July 6, 2009, President Barack Obama and President Dmitry Medvedev held a three-hour meeting in the Kremlin in Russia. They agreed in principle to cutting their nuclear stockpiles to below 1,700 deployed warheads within seven years after a new treaty is created. The START I treaty, which is the current nuclear weapons agreement between the two countries, expires in December 2009. Russia additionally allowed U.S. arms shipments to the battlefront in Afghanistan through Russia.

During a three-day trip (started July 20, 2009) to Ukraine and Georgia Vice President Joe Biden again stated that the United States will not recognize Abkhazia and South Ossetia as independent states, and urged "the world" not to recognize them as independent states.

On March 24, 2010, the United States and Russia reached an agreement to reduce their stockpiles of nuclear weapons. President Obama and President Medvedev are set sign a treaty in Prague, the week of April 4, 2010. The agreement is expected to cut the number of long-range nuclear weapons held by each side to about 1,500, down from the current 1,700 to 2,200 set by the Moscow Treaty of 2002. The new agreement would replace the 1991 Strategic Arms Reduction Treaty, which expired in December 2009.

Obama's pragmatic policy towards Russia has drawn criticism from his opponents, especially from hawks and neoconservatives, though also from many liberals. In aftermath of the US-Russia spy scandal, Republicans denounced Obama as the "12th Russian spy", and right-wing radio show host Rush Limbaugh said: "Why do [the Russians] have to spy on us? Obama will tell them anything they want to know." While conservatives try to use it to emphasize his (in their view) lack of patriotism, liberal criticism of Obama's relations with Russia focus on Russia's dismal human rights record.

== Switzerland ==
The Obama administration's foreign policy toward Switzerland was characterized in a March 2009 editorial for The Guardian as "increasingly hostile". Indeed, shortly after Obama's election in November 2008, the then-president-elect reportedly developed plans with key economic advisers to push for a crackdown on tax havens in early 2009, and as a senator, Obama co-sponsored the Stop Tax Havens Act of 2007, which identified Switzerland as among 34 "Offshore Secrecy Jurisdictions" warranting strengthened powers of investigation and summons for the IRS, which Obama reportedly wants reintroduced and passed by the 111th United States Congress.

On February 19, 2009, the United States government filed a lawsuit against UBS AG, a major Swiss bank, demanding it release the names of almost 52,000 Americans who allegedly used its secret accounts to avoid paying taxes on their income. In the matter of U.S. v. UBS AG (2009), the Switzerland-based bank stands accused by U.S. authorities of "conspiring to defraud the U.S. by helping Americans hide accounts from the IRS". In response to the U.S. suit, the conservative Swiss People's Party proposed a number of punitive measures for Bern to inflict on the United States, including rejection of Guantánamo Bay detainees and repatriation of Swiss gold from the U.S.

On February 28, 2009, Swiss President Hans-Rudolf Merz suggested that Switzerland might need to "make a few concessions" on matters of bank secrecy in light of the Great Recession in order to avoid being sanctioned as "an uncooperative tax haven".

United States Attorney General Eric Holder, who as a former attorney for UBS AG has recused himself from the bank's investigation, met with his Swiss counterpart, Eveline Widmer-Schlumpf, on March 2, 2009. Widmer-Schlumpf earlier met with Acting Deputy Attorney General David Margolis to discuss "international finance issues", according to the United States Department of Justice. Writing ahead of the meetings, former United States Ambassador to Switzerland Faith Whittlesey cautioned the Obama administration against taking too aggressive an approach with a government she characterized as "stable, responsible...[and] reliable", warning that a deterioration of relations with Switzerland could lead to deeper economic turmoil. Widmer-Schlumpf later said that Margolis and Holder "expressed their willingness to negotiate with Switzerland, to discuss with us, and especially in the UBS case, Mr. Margolis said that he was not interested in having an escalation".

The Obama administration scored a diplomatic victory when Merz announced that Switzerland would adapt its policy to OECD standards and henceforth cooperate with foreign bodies on matters of international tax evasion. On September 26, 2009, Swiss police authorities arrested the fugitive Roman Polanski, who fled the United States in 1977. Swiss police claimed it was a routine arrest, although some politicians claimed it was motivated by Swiss worries over new US policy on tax evasion in Switzerland may have prompted them to act over-energetically. An extradition request was filed by the US government on October 23.

== Ukraine ==
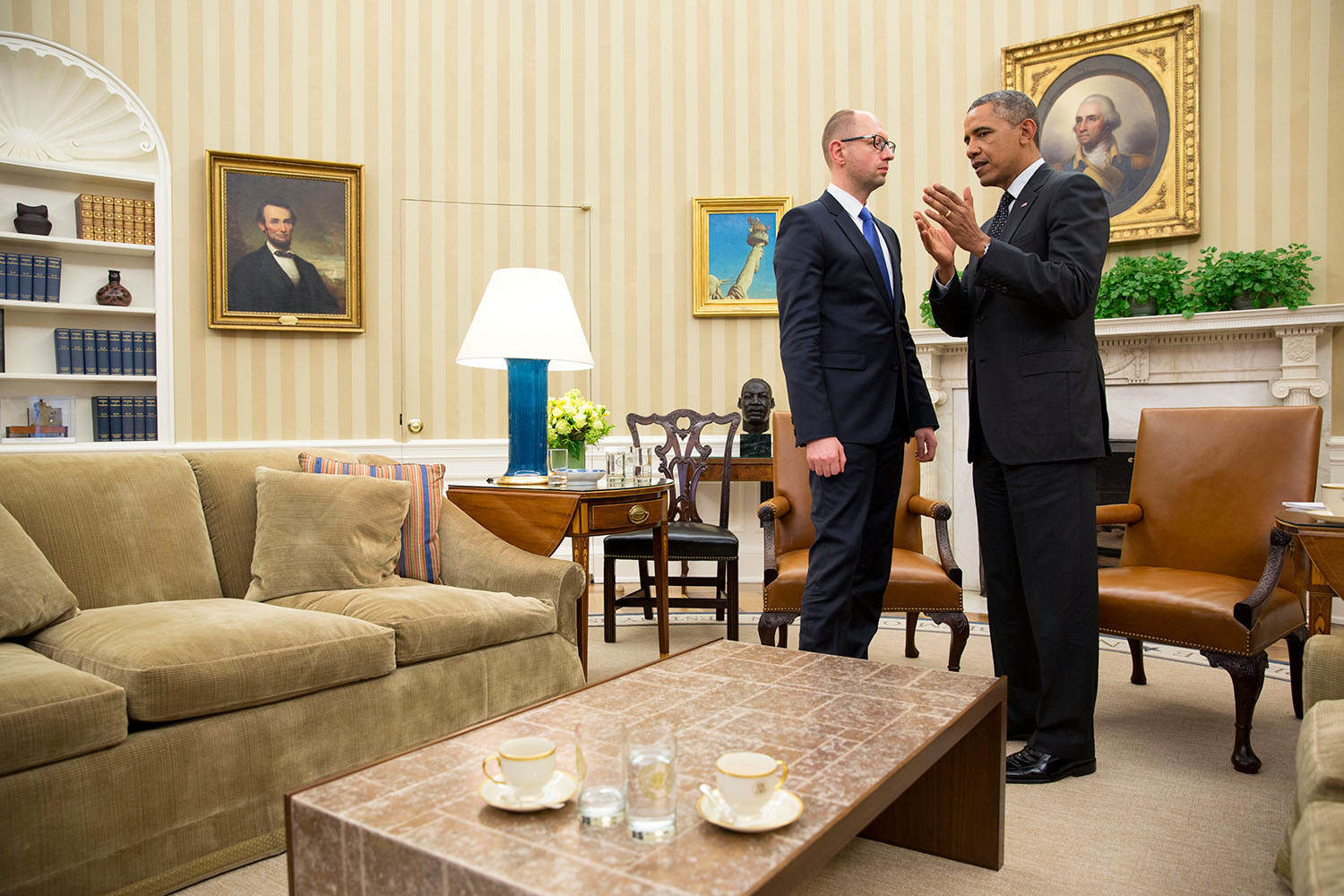
President Barack Obama talks with Prime Minister Arseniy Yatsenyuk of Ukraine at the conclusion of their bilateral meeting in the Oval Office, March 12, 2014.

During the 2008 United States presidential election both (final) nominees for president, U.S. senator Barack Obama and U.S. senator John McCain, did offer backing to Ukraine's January 2008 membership proposal of NATO.

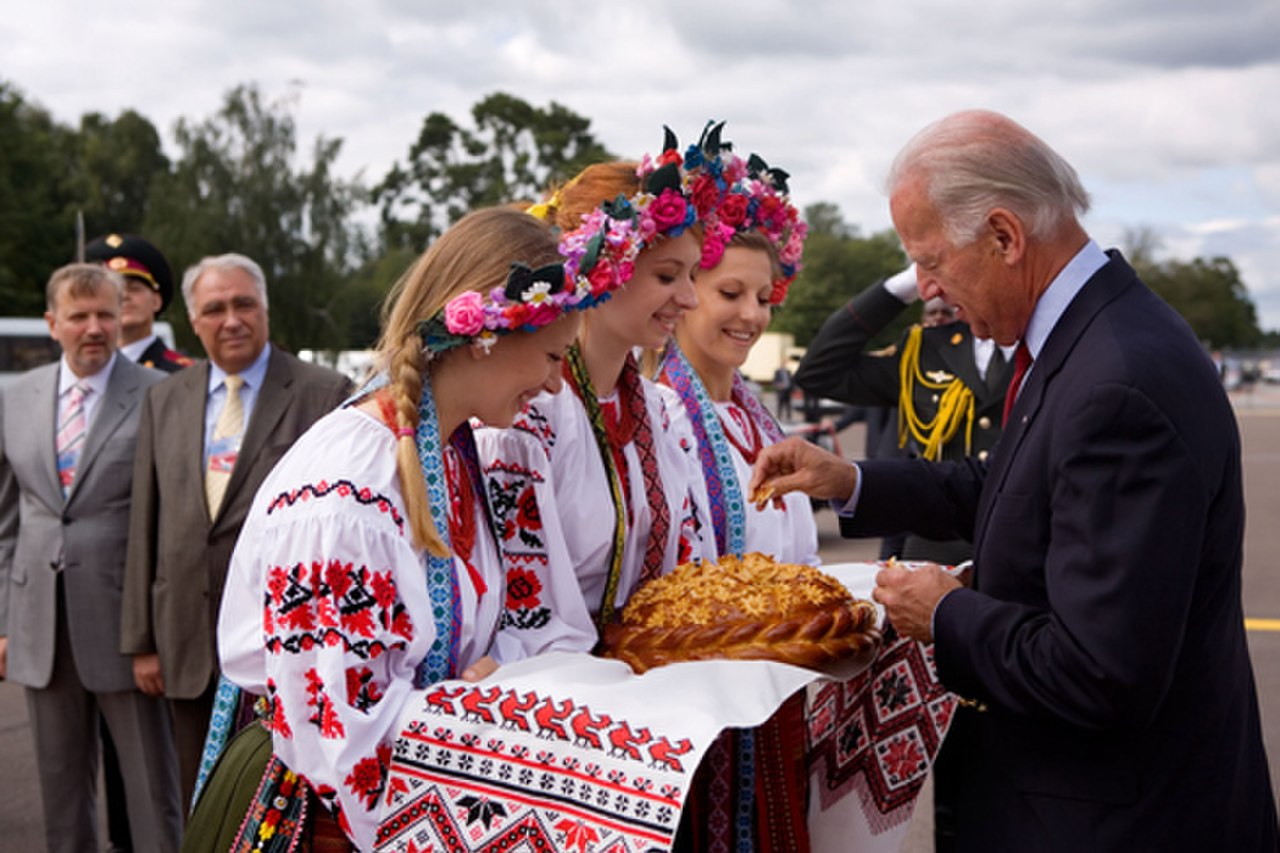
Vice President Biden receives the traditional bread and salt greeting in Kyiv (July 20, 2009).

Two weeks after a visit by President Obama to Russia in July 2009 Vice President Joe Biden visited Ukraine. During the visit Biden assured the Ukrainian government that the United States would continue to support Ukraine's bid to join NATO despite Russia's objections, "the reset of relationship with Russia" (that the Obama administration wants to pursue) will not come at Ukraine's expense and Biden (once again) rejected the idea of a Russian "sphere of influence": "We do not recognize anyone else's right to dictate to you or any other country what alliances you will seek to belong to or what relationships you -- bilateral relationships you have". This echoed President Obama speech of July 7, 2009, at the New Economic School during his (July 2009) visit to Russia: "We must apply state sovereignty to all nations -- and that includes nations like Georgia and Ukraine".

In a joint statement on December 4, 2009, President Obama and the President of Russia Dmitry Medvedev confirmed the assurances of security to Ukraine, Kazakhstan and Belarus given on the heels of these countries’ consent in 1994 to give up their nuclear weapons.

Secretary of State Hillary Clinton visited Ukraine on July 2, 2010, (on a tour with Armenia, Georgia and Azerbaijan). During the visit she stated "Ukraine is a sovereign and independent country that has the right to choose its own alliances and NATO's door remains open". Clinton expressed US support for Ukraine's efforts to strengthen its ties with Russia, as long as that did not come at the expense of relations with Europe and the US. At a town hall meeting at Kyiv Polytechnic Institute Clinton addressed the challenges Ukrainian President Viktor Yanukovych will face meeting his commitments to eradicate corruption and preserve media freedoms "Rhetoric alone does not change behaviour". Clinton also met former Prime Minister Yulia Tymoshenko.

== United Kingdom ==
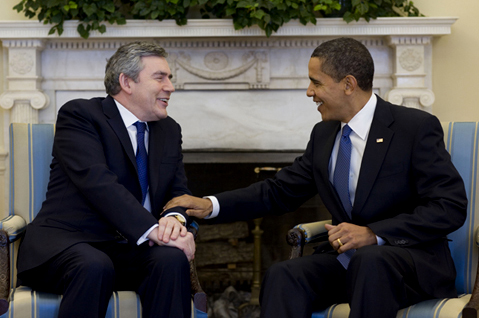
Obama and British Prime Minister Gordon Brown, March 2009.

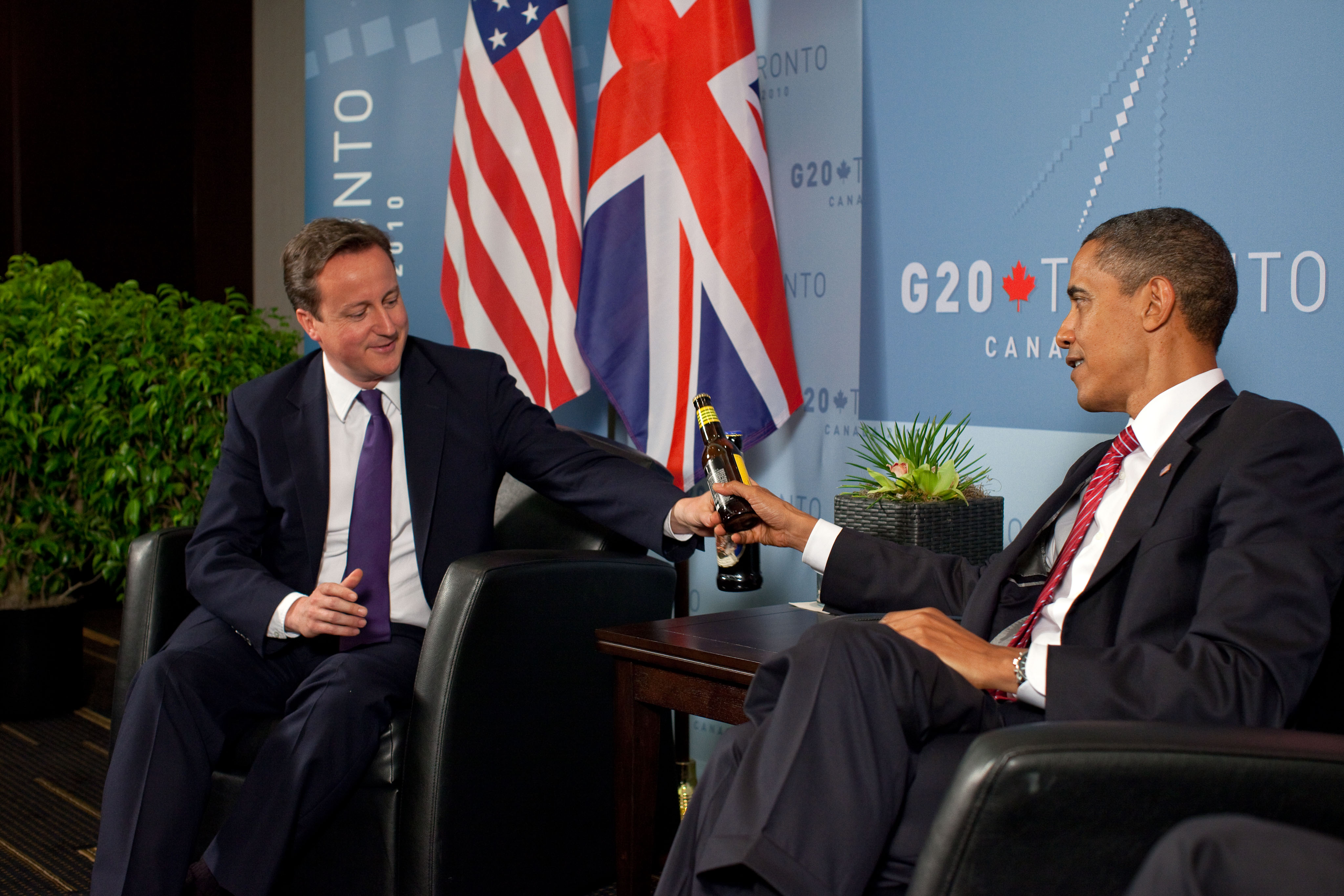
Obama and British Prime Minister David Cameron during the G20 summit in Toronto, June 2010.

Under the administrations of Bill Clinton and George W. Bush, the United States enjoyed a "special relationship" with the United Kingdom, particularly during the government of Prime Minister Tony Blair. Obama was sworn in as President of the United States in the midst of a global recession, which continues to deeply affect both countries.

Questions have arisen, especially in London, over Obama's intentions regarding the future of the "special relationship" between the U.S. and the United Kingdom. Comments made by White House Press Secretary Robert Gibbs on February 21, 2009, attracted scrutiny due to Gibbs' use of the phrase "special partnership" in favor of the traditional "special relationship", which some analysts and officials took as an indication that Obama will approach relations with the UK in a more businesslike, less personal way.

British Prime Minister Gordon Brown became the first European leader to meet with Obama on March 3, 2009, and he addressed a joint session of Congress the following day. During his visit to the Obama White House, he presented the president a gift of a pen holder carved from the timbers of HMS Gannet, which served anti-slavery missions off the coast of Africa. Obama's gift to the prime minister was a box of 25 DVDs with movies including Star Wars and E.T.

On March 1, 2009, Brown addressed the topic of joint Anglo-American leadership to combat the recession in a column for The Sunday Times. In the column, he said that he and Obama would discuss "a global new deal" that would encourage unified action by various national governments to fight off the effects of the economic crisis, including international cooperation to institute standard regulation and reform of problematic industries, such as financial corporations.

The Obamas met personally with Queen Elizabeth II of the United Kingdom on April 1, 2009. Such meetings are typically conducted in the process of a state visit, with this meeting being a rare exception.

President Obama frustrated many in Britain by his refusal to enter into the sovereignty dispute in the Falklands on the British side.

In May 2011, as part of a broader visit to Europe, President and Mrs. Obama met with Her Majesty, Queen Elizabeth II and Prince Philip, Charles, Prince of Wales and his wife Camilla, Duchess of Cornwall, and briefly with Prince William, Duke of Cambridge and his new wife, Catherine, Duchess of Cambridge. The Queen gave a state dinner for President Obama, at which toasts recognizing each other's leadership were given (Obama paused during his toast of the Queen, and the British national anthem, "God Save the Queen" was begun, but he continued speaking during the music until he had finished his statement; the toast was done after it ended). President Obama also met with British Prime Minister David Cameron and gave the only address of a sitting U.S. president to both houses of the British Parliament at Westminster.

In April 2016, President Obama made several statements regarding Brexit that sparked angry criticism from leaders of the pro-Brexit camp in UK, including that UK would be placed at the "back of the queue" to conclude bilateral trade deals with the United States if it left European Union.
