= Gun control policy of the Clinton administration =

U.S. domestic policy on guns during Bill Clinton's term in office as President

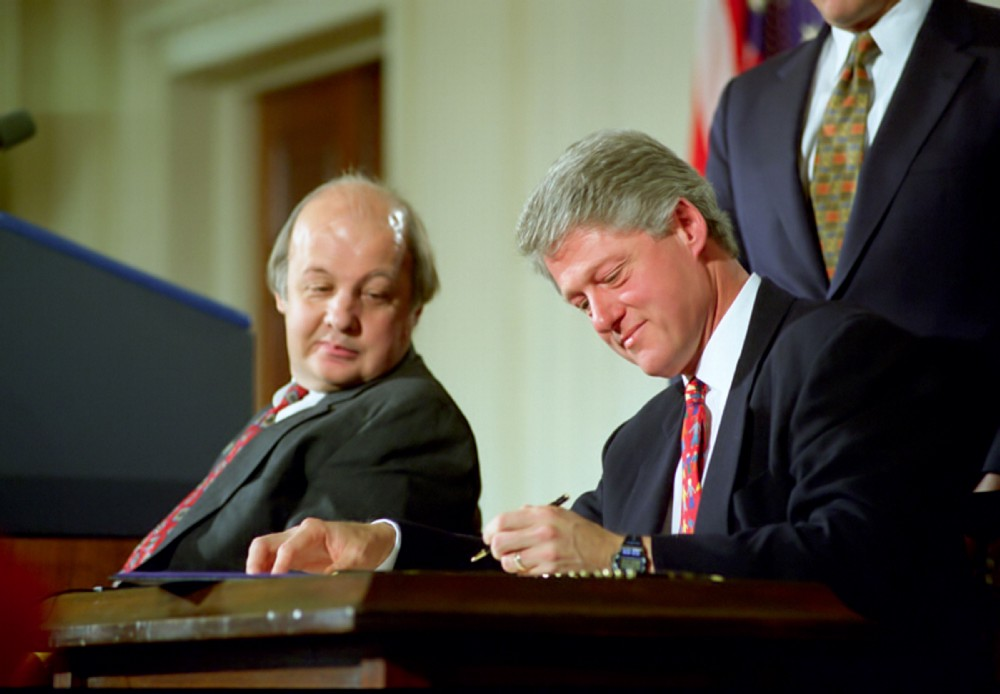
President Clinton signs the Brady Bill.

The gun control policy of the Bill Clinton administration was the White House's domestic policy on guns during Bill Clinton's term in office as President of the United States from 1993 to 2001. Gun control was a major political issue in the first half of Clinton's first term and during that time he lobbied for, and signed, two major pieces of gun control legislation, the Brady Bill and the 1994 Federal Assault Weapons Ban.

== Background ==
After receiving the Democratic nomination for president, Clinton campaigned against George H. W. Bush, in the fall of 1992. In the six previous elections, Republicans had garnered enormous success by labeling their opponents as "soft on crime". Democrats had not used gun control in the past as an election issue. Clinton reversed the tide by using gun control as an issue and calling Bush soft on crime for not pushing for passage of the Brady Bill or the nationwide assault weapons ban. Clinton also strongly endorsed the death penalty. Bush called for " Going after the criminal not the gun owner". However, on March 15, 1989, less than two months after taking office, Bush temporarily banned, by executive order, the importation of various semi-automatic "assault weapons". That ban was extended a few weeks later to include additional firearms, and was made permanent by Bush in July, 1989. Clinton won the 1992 election with 43% of the vote.

== Brady Bill ==
Soon after taking office, it was clear that one of the most important items on the domestic agenda for the President was to pass the Brady Bill. The bill was named after Ronald Reagan's press secretary James Brady, who was wounded during the attempt on Reagan's life by John Hinckley. Brady's wife, Sarah, became a gun control advocate, and sought to put restrictions on the purchasing on handguns. The bill had been introduced several times in Congress during the 1980s and early 1990s. President Bush had vetoed an earlier version of the bill after intense pressure from the National Rifle Association (NRA).

The Brady Bill became personal for President Clinton. He became a political ally with Sarah Brady in her quest to get the bill passed. Clinton also saw first hand what he believed was a need for the bill. When he was campaigning for Governor of Arkansas he met a hardware store owner who had sold a handgun to an unstable Vietnam vet, who had just been released from a mental hospital. The man went on a killing spree with the gun. Clinton cited this in his autobiography, as the best argument he encountered as to why the background checks in the Brady Law were needed.

In February 1993 Clinton encouraged congress to pass the Brady bill, stating that he would sign it if they passed it. That same month Charles Schumer introduced the bill in the House and Howard Metzenbaum did so in the Senate. Public opinion polls at the time showed a majority favored the bill. After several months of debate, the White House had put enough pressure on congress to get several Republican in both houses to support the bill. Despite last-ditch efforts by pro-gun Senators and the NRA, the bill managed to pass both houses and was signed into law on November 30, 1993. The law required a five-day waiting period after purchasing a handgun, and the dealer had to report the sale to the local chief law enforcement officer to run a check on the buyer. Clinton may have called the bill a "good beginning" for more gun control legislation. Many credit Clinton's skills at building coalitions and using the public stage to keep pressure on getting the bill passed.

== Federal assault weapons ban ==
One year after signing the Brady Law, White House lobbying also played a role in the passage of the 1994 Crime Bill, which included the Public Safety and Recreational Firearms Use Protection Act, commonly known as the Federal Assault Weapons Ban. The law banned certain semi-automatic firearms with two or more specific design features, and also prohibited the manufacture of ammunition magazines that held over ten rounds.

Although initially heralded as a victory for Clinton and Democrats in congress, it proved costly. The bill energized the NRA and Republican base, and contributed to the Republican takeover of both houses in the 1994 mid-term elections. Many Democrats who had supported Clinton's gun control measures were ousted, including Speaker Tom Foley. Clinton acknowledged that he had hurt Democrats with his victories.

Clinton continued to push further regulations of firearms in his second term, especially after the Columbine High School massacre. Little success came out of his efforts as Republicans controlled Congress during this time, and a majority opposed any further gun control. The House voted to overturn the assault weapons ban in 1996, but the Senate failed to take up the issue.

== Lasting effects ==
Certain aspects of the Brady Bill were ruled unconstitutional in court (Printz v. United States), and the government now uses an instant check system instead of a five-day wait, but otherwise it survived and is still in effect today. Clinton claimed that the program had stopped thousand of criminals from purchasing guns. Critics pointed out that by 1999, of the more than 23,000 cases that had been referred for prosecution by the Federal Bureau of Investigation (FBI), the BATF had only arrested 56 people. The assault weapons ban had a sunset clause and expired on September 13, 2004.

== Executive Orders ==
During his term, President Clinton also used the power of executive orders to implement gun control policies. On April 6, 1998, Clinton signed an order that permanently banned the importation of more than 50 types of semiautomatic "assault weapons". In 1999, White House domestic policy chief Bruce D. Reed said, "The country is tired of waiting for Congress to respond to the tragedy in Littleton. The administration is going to do every thing in its power to make progress on guns." Many accused Clinton of overuse of the executive power on gun control issues.

== Settlement with Smith & Wesson ==
In 2000, the Clinton administration reached an agreement with Smith & Wesson, to end federal and state lawsuits, in exchange for marketing and design changes by the company. Some of the items Smith & Wesson agreed to were; to sell guns with locks, to build the locks in the weapons within two years, implement smart gun technology, and take ballistic fingerprints of its guns. Clinton called the deal a "major victory for America's families." The NRA and other gun rights groups heavily criticized the settlement calling Smith & Wesson's actions "a sell-out", with the NRA calling the agreement ""tantamount to back door blackmail". Smith & Wesson's ownership changed in 2001 and the agreement fell apart after George W. Bush came to office and supported lawsuit protection for gun manufactures. However, Smith & Wesson continues to sell guns with internal locks.

== See also ==
- Bill Clinton
- Gun politics in the United States
- Clinton Administration
