= Foreign policy of the François Mitterrand administration =

The foreign policy of the François Mitterrand administration was the foreign policy of France under François Mitterrand that emphasized European unity and the preservation of France's special relationships with its former colonies in the face of "Anglo-Saxon influence." He served as President of France for two 7-year terms, from 1981 to 1995. A part of the enacted policies was formulated in the Socialist Party's 110 Propositions for France, the electoral program for the 1981 presidential election. He had a warm and effective relationship with the conservative German Chancellor Helmut Kohl. They promoted French-German bilateralism in Europe and strengthened military cooperation between the two countries. There was a high Level of continuity with the policies of Charles de Gaulle especially in terms of nationalism, NATO, nuclear weapons, French Africa, and distrust of the British and Americans.

== Mitterrand's style ==
Pursuing Charles de Gaulle's interpretation of the Constitution of the Fifth Republic, Mitterrand retained foreign affairs as part of the "reserved affairs" of the President, and particularly focused on them during the Cohabitation with Prime minister Jacques Chirac (1986–88). On the whole, there was a great deal of continuity with the policies set by Charles de Gaulle especially in terms of nationalism, defense policies, nuclear weapons, French Africa, and distrust of the British and Americans.

Foreign policies were determined by several different branches of Mitterrand's government, the foreign policy advisers of the president's staff, the prime minister and his advisers, the Ministry of Defense, and certain civil servants in the Quai d'Orsay, often with little coordination. French diplomat François Heisbourg described Mitterrand's governing style as maintaining as many options as possible until forced to pursue a particular course. However, once he made a choice he kept his ministers on a tight leash. Defense Minister Jean-Pierre Chevènement lost his ministry over his opposition to French participation in the First Gulf War.

Wayne Northcutt identifies ways were domestic politics helped shape his foreign policy. Mitterrand wanted to maintain a broad political consensus for his foreign policy. Changing economic needs called for responses in foreign policy. Mitterrand was committed to a nationalistic comparative of the sort President Charles de Gaulle had so successfully stressed.

== Germany ==
Initially, Mitterrand, like British Prime Minister, Margaret Thatcher, was wary of German reunification, fearing that it would lead to the Federal Republic of Germany gaining too much power. He was reluctant to take action because Soviet General Secretary Mikhail Gorbachev warned it would lead to a military coup d'état in the Soviet Union. Mitterrand did speak in favour of reunification in July 1989.

France played an active role in helping Germany unify, especially through the relaunch of European integration that led to the 1992 Maastricht Treaty.

== Israel ==
In March 1982 Mitterrand became the first French President to visit Israel since the founding of the Fifth Republic in 1958. He spoke at the Knesset about Israel's right to security and in favor of Palestinian state, a speech praised by diplomatic adviser Hubert Védrine as a "masterpiece of Mitterrandian farsightedness, tact, and courage." Prior to his presidency he supported the Camp David Accords.

As Israeli involvement in the Lebanese Civil War grew, Mitterrand felt that Israeli Prime Minister Menachem Begin had lied to him about Israel's "limited aims" of the June 6 campaign in southern Lebanon. Mitterrand condemned the Israeli siege of Beirut during the summer of 1982 and he sent French Armed Forces troops to secure the safe evacuation of the Palestine Liberation Organization (PLO) leadership and fighters from Lebanon. Mitterrand's calls for mutual recognition between Israel and the PLO went unheard for many years but, after the PLO recognized the state of Israel, Mitterrand welcomed the PLO leader, Yasser Arafat, in Paris, in May 1989.

== New Zealand ==
The sinking of the Rainbow Warrior, codenamed Opération Satanique, was an operation by the "action" branch of the French foreign intelligence services, the Direction Générale de la Sécurité Extérieure (DGSE), carried out on July 10, 1985. It aimed to sink the flagship of the Greenpeace fleet, the Rainbow Warrior in Auckland Harbour, New Zealand, to prevent her from interfering in a nuclear test in Moruroa.

The scandal resulted in the resignation of the French Defence Minister Charles Hernu, and the subject remained controversial. It was twenty years afterwards that the personal responsibility of French President François Mitterrand was admitted.

== Africa ==
Socialist rhetoric had long attacked the imperialistic program of the French overseas empire, and his continuity in Francophone Africa after those states gained independence. Mitterrand ignored that old rhetoric, and maintained the French supervision of the former colonies. However, unlike his predecessors who maintained strong ties with South Africa, Mitterrand denounced the crimes of Apartheid.

=== Gabon ===
Mitterrand paid special attention to Gabon because of its strategic location and important economy. Mitterrand generally supported the regime of Gabon's president Omar Bongo, who had ruled since 1967. He mostly ignored the long-standing socialist and communist complaints about injustice and corruption in Gabon.

=== Rwanda ===
The French daily newspaper Le Monde printed newly declassified government memos and diplomatic telegrams revealing Mitterrand's support for Juvénal Habyarimana's regime on July 6, 2007. The official French policy was to push Habyarimana in sharing power, while stopping Paul Kagamé's Rwandan Patriotic Front's military advance, supported by Uganda, in the Rwandan Civil War. On April 2, 1993, after an agreement between Habyarimana and Kagamé which prepared the August 1993 Arusha Accords, conservative Prime minister Edouard Balladur envisioned to send 1,000 more soldiers, a proposition accepted by Mitterrand. The documents prove that the French government was aware of ethnic cleansings committed by Hutu extremists as soon as February 1993, a year before the assassination of Habyarimana which triggered a full-scale genocide.

== Soviet Union ==
Although there was official communist party participation in his government, it had little influence on Mitterrand's foreign-policy. He pushed for an even harder line against the Soviet Union in reaction against Soviet takeover of Afghanistan, and the imposition of martial law in Poland to suppress democratic forces. After the communist satellite regimes all collapsed in late 1989, Mitterrand proposed the creation of "a European confederation" designed to "associate all states of [the] continent in a common and permanent organisation for exchanges, peace and security." Outside France there was little support for this grandiose project, which conflicted with both the European Union and NATO, and the proposal was off the table.

== Yugoslavia ==
Mitterrand opposed Germany's rapid recognition of Croatia's independence, fearing this would lead to the violent breakup of Yugoslavia. He advocated for a common, European recognition of Croatia, and to "suggest to Serbs and Croats to retain a link between themselves." He declared on 14 December 1991 to the Frankfurter Allgemeine Zeitung newspaper : "We don't have any interest that Europe explodes in a thousand pieces."

== See also ==
- Foreign relations of France
- Angolagate
- 110 Propositions for France
