= Stem cell laws and policy in the United States =

Stem cell laws and policy in the United States have had a complicated legal and political history.

== Science background ==
Stem cells are cells found in all multi-cellular organisms. They were isolated in mice in 1981, and in humans in 1998. In humans there are many types of stem cells, each with varying levels of potency. Potency is a measure of a cell's differentiation potential, or the number of other cell types that can be made from that stem cell. Embryonic stem cells are pluripotent stem cells derived from the inner cell mass of the blastocyst. These stem cells can differentiate into all other cells in the human body and are the subject of much scientific research. However, since they must be derived from early human embryos their production and use in research has been a hotly debated topic.

Stem cell treatments are a type of cell therapy that introduce new cells into adult bodies for possible treatment of cancer, diabetes, neurological disorders and other medical conditions. Stem cells have been used to repair tissue damaged by disease or age. Cloning also might be done with stem cells. Pluripotent stem cells can also be derived from Somatic cell nuclear transfer which is a laboratory technique where a clone embryo is created from a donor nucleus. Somatic cell nuclear transfer is also tightly regulated amongst various countries.

Until recently, the principal source of human embryonic stem cells has been donated embryos from fertility clinics. In January 2007, researchers at Wake Forest University reported that "stem cells drawn from amniotic fluid donated by pregnant women hold much of the same promise as embryonic stem cells."

In 2000, the NIH, under the administration of President Bill Clinton, issued "guidelines that allow federal funding of embryonic stem-cell research."

== Political beginnings ==
In 1973, Roe v. Wade legalized abortion in the United States. Five years later, the first successful human in vitro fertilization resulted in the birth of Louise Brown in England. These developments prompted the federal government to create regulations barring the use of federal funds for research that experimented on human embryos. In 1995, the NIH Human Embryo Research Panel advised the administration of President Bill Clinton to permit federal funding for research on embryos left over from in vitro fertility treatments and also recommended federal funding of research on embryos specifically created for experimentation. In response to the panel's recommendations, the Clinton administration, citing moral and ethical concerns, declined to fund research on embryos created solely for research purposes, but did agree to fund research on left-over embryos created by in vitro fertility treatments. At this point, the Congress intervened and passed the Dickey–Wicker Amendment in 1995 (the final bill, which included the Dickey Amendment, was signed into law by Bill Clinton) which prohibited any federal funding for the Department of Health and Human Services be used for research that resulted in the destruction of an embryo regardless of the source of that embryo. In 1998, privately funded research led to the breakthrough discovery of human Embryonic stem cells (hESC).

== Federal law ==
No federal law ever did ban stem cell research in the United States, but only placed restrictions on funding and use, under Congress's power to spend.

In February 2001, George W. Bush requested a review of the NIH's guidelines, and after a policy discussion within his circle of supporters, implemented a policy in August of that year to limit the number of embryonic stem cell lines that could be used for research. (While he claimed that 78 lines would qualify for federal funding, only 19 lines were actually available.)

In April 2004, 206 members of Congress, including many moderate Republicans, signed a letter urging President Bush to expand federal funding of embryonic stem cell research beyond what Bush had already supported.

In May 2005, the House of Representatives voted 238-194 to loosen the limitations on federally funded embryonic stem-cell research — by allowing government-funded research on surplus frozen embryos from in vitro fertilization clinics to be used for stem cell research with the permission of donors — despite Bush's promise to veto if passed. On July 29, 2005, Senate Majority Leader William H. Frist (R-TN), announced that he too favored loosening restrictions on federal funding of embryonic stem cell research. On July 18, 2006, the Senate passed three different bills concerning stem cell research. The Senate passed the first bill, 63-37, which would have made it legal for the Federal government to spend Federal money on embryonic stem cell research that uses embryos left over from in vitro fertilization procedures. On July 19, 2006, President Bush vetoed this bill. The second bill makes it illegal to create, grow, and abort fetuses for research purposes. The third bill would encourage research that would isolate pluripotent, i.e., embryonic-like, stem cells without the destruction of human embryos.

The National Institutes of Health has hundreds of funding opportunities for researchers interested in hESC. In 2005 the NIH funded $607 million worth of stem cell research, of which $39 million was specifically used for hESC.

During Bush's second term, in July 2006, he used his first Presidential veto on the Stem Cell Research Enhancement Act. The Stem Cell Research Enhancement Act was the name of two similar bills, and both were vetoed by President George W. Bush and were not enacted into law. New Jersey congressman Chris Smith wrote a Stem Cell Therapeutic and Research Act of 2005, which was signed into law by President Bush. It provided $265 million for adult stem cell therapy, umbilical cord blood and bone marrow treatment, and authorized $79 million for the collection of cord blood stem cells.

By executive order on March 9, 2009, President Barack Obama removed certain restrictions on federal funding for research involving new lines of human embryonic stem cells. Prior to President Obama's executive order, federal funding was limited to non-embryonic stem cell research and embryonic stem cell research based upon embryonic stem cell lines in existence prior to August 9, 2001. Federal funding originating from current appropriations to the Department of Health and Human Services (including the National Institutes of Health) under the Omnibus Appropriations Act of 2009, remains prohibited under the Dickey–Wicker Amendment for (1) the creation of a human embryo for research purposes; or (2) research in which a human embryo or embryos are destroyed, discarded, or knowingly subjected to risk of injury or death greater than that allowed for research on fetuses in utero.

In a speech before signing the executive order, President Obama noted the following:

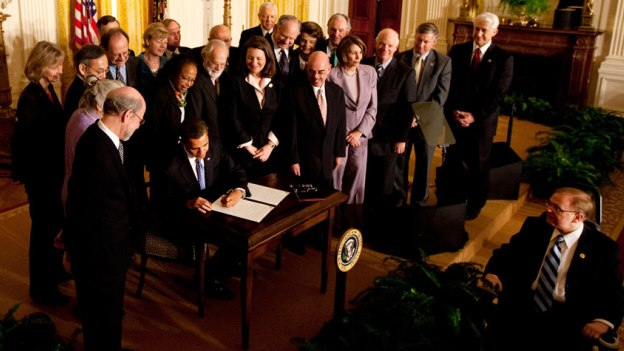
President Obama lifts federal funding restrictions on stem cell research.

Today, with the Executive Order I am about to sign, we will bring the change that so many scientists and researchers; doctors and innovators; patients and loved ones have hoped for, and fought for, these past eight years: we will lift the ban on federal funding for promising embryonic stem cell research. We will vigorously support scientists who pursue this research. And we will aim for America to lead the world in the discoveries it one day may yield.

In 2011, a United States District Court "threw out a lawsuit that challenged the use of federal funds for embryonic stem cell research." The decision was a case on remand from the United States Court of Appeals for the District of Columbia Circuit.

== State law ==
=== Legalization and funding ===
S1909/A2840 is a bill that was passed by the New Jersey legislature in December 2003, and signed into law by Governor James McGreevey on January 4, 2004, that permits human cloning for the purpose of developing and harvesting human stem cells. Specifically, it legalizes the process of cloning a human embryo, and implanting the clone into a womb, provided that the clone is then aborted and used for medical research. Missouri Constitutional Amendment 2 (2006) (Missouri Amendment Two) was a 2006 law that legalized certain forms of embryonic stem cell research in the state.

California voters in November 2004 approved Proposition 71, creating a US$3 billion state taxpayer-funded institute for stem cell research, the California Institute for Regenerative Medicine. It hopes to provide $300 million a year. However, as of June 6, 2006, there were delays in the implementation of the California program and it is believed that the delays will continue for the significant future. On July 21, 2006, Governor Arnold Schwarzenegger (R-Calif.) authorized $150 million in loans to the Institute in an attempt to jump start the process of funding research.

Several states, in what was initially believed to be a national migration of biotech researchers to California, have shown interest in providing their own funding support of embryonic and adult stem cell research. These states include Connecticut, Florida, Illinois, Massachusetts, Missouri, New Hampshire, New York, Pennsylvania, Texas Around The Area, Washington, and Wisconsin.

=== Bans and restrictions ===
Other states have (or have shown interest in) additional restrictions or even complete bans on embryonic stem cell research. These states include Arkansas, Iowa, Kansas, Louisiana, Nebraska, North Dakota, South Dakota, and Virginia. Arkansas, Indiana, Louisiana, Michigan (subsequently reversed by constitutional amendment), North Dakota and South Dakota have passed laws to "prohibit the creation or destruction of human embryos for medical research."

==== States with statutes specifically banning human reproductive and therapeutic cloning ====
- Arkansas, [2003 SB 185]; Ark. Code § 20- 16-1001 et. seq. (2004)
- Indiana, Ind. Code § 1 6-18-2-5.5. -56.5, -128.5, -183.5 (2005)
- Michigan, Mich. Comp. Laws §§ 333.26401-06, 333.16274, 16275, 20197, 750.430a (2004), reversed by constitutional amendment in proposal 2008-02.
- North Dakota, [2003 HB 1424]; N.D. Cent. Code §§ 12.1-39-01, 12.1-39-02 (2004)
- South Dakota, 2004 SB 184
- Virginia, Va. Code Ann. §§ 32.1-162.21- .22 (2004) (unclear whether therapeutic cloning is included in the ban)

==== States with statutes specifically banning human reproductive cloning ====
- Iowa, Iowa Code §§ 707C (2007)
- Maryland, 2006 SB 144

==== States banning the use of public funding for reproductive and/or therapeutic cloning ====
- Arizona, HB 2221 (2005) (human reproductive and therapeutic cloning)
- Missouri, Mo. Rev. Stat. § 1.217 (2004) (human reproductive cloning)

==== States with statutes specifically allowing therapeutic cloning ====
- California, Cal. Bus. & Prof. §§ 16004, 16105; Cal. Health & Safety §§24185-24187 (2004)
- Missouri, Mo. Rev. Stat. § 1.217 (2004)
- New Jersey, [2003 SB 1909/2003 AB 2840]; N.J. Stat. § 2C:11A-1 (2004)
- Rhode Island, R.I. Gen. Laws §§ 23-16.4-1 - .4-4 (2004) (Sunset provision: July 7, 2010)
- Connecticut, Public Act 05-149 (2005)

== Policy stances of political parties and politicians ==
Policy stances on stem cell research of various political leaders in the United States have not always been predictable.

As a rule, most Democratic Party leaders and high-profile supporters and even rank and file members have pushed for laws and policies almost exclusively favoring embryonic stem cell research. President Bill Clinton supported the NIH's guidelines in 2000. Both the major candidates in 2008 had supported the 2005 and 2007 bills, in particular Hillary Rodham Clinton, Bill Clinton's First Lady, then U. S. Senator for New York, and Barack Obama, then U.S. Senator for Illinois, who promised to sign the EFCA into law, and was a cosponsor of such bills. Massachusetts governor Deval Patrick is also a proponent of embryonic stem cell research. There have been some Democrats who have asked for boundaries be placed on human embryo use. For example, Carolyn McCarthy has publicly stated she only supports using human embryos "that would be discarded".

The Republicans largely oppose embryonic stem cell research in favor of adult stem cell research which has already produced cures and treatments for cancer and paralysis for example, but there are some high-profile exceptions who offer qualified support for some embryonic stem cell research. Prominent Republican leaders against embryonic stem cell research include Sarah Palin, Jim Talent, Rick Santorum, and Sam Brownback. In July 2001:

Sen. Bill Frist (R-TN) and Sen. Orrin Hatch (R-UT), a vocal abortion opponent, call[ed] for limited federal funding for embryonic stem-cell research.... House Speaker Dennis Hastert (R-IL) and other Republican House leaders [came] out in opposition to federal funding for embryonic stem cell research.

— NPR story.

2008 GOP Presidential Candidate John McCain was a member of The Republican Main Street Partnership, and supported embryonic stem cell research, despite his earlier opposition. In July 2008 he said, "At the moment I support stem cell research [because of] the potential it has for curing some of the most terrible diseases that afflict mankind." In 2007, in what he described as "a very agonizing and tough decision," he voted to allow research using human embryos left over from fertility treatments. Former First Lady Nancy Reagan and Senator Orrin Hatch also support stem cell research, after first opposing the issue. Former Senator Frist also supports stem cell research, despite having initially supported past restrictions on embryonic stem cell research. 2008 V.P. candidate Palin opposed embryonic stem cell research, which she said causes the destruction of life, thus this research is inconsistent with her pro-life position and she does not support it.

A few moderates or Libertarians support such research with limits. Lincoln Chafee supported federal funding for embryonic stem cell research. Ron Paul, a Republican congressman, physician, and Libertarian and Independent candidate for President, has sponsored much legislation, and has had quite complex positions.

== Impact on science and innovation of changes in funding policies ==
Several studies have examined the impact of changing funding policies on scientific research in the US and the development of new cell therapies by industry. For example, studies have highlighted an immediate and sizable drop in research productivity of US-based researchers as compared to researchers based elsewhere during the years after the enactment in August 2001 of federal funding restrictions on research involving new embryonic stem cell lines. US knowledge production in the human embryonic stem cell field fell 35 to 40 percent below anticipated levels, and measured in terms of forward citations to core research publications in the field, US-based follow-on work in the human embryonic stem cell research field declined by nearly 59 percent relative to non-US-based research over the period 2001-2003. During this period US based firms were also less likely to launch new therapeutic product development projects in the cell therapy field than firms outside the US, and were more likely to discontinue clinical trials for new cell therapies that were already under way. All these effects were reversed as the funding environment for stem cell research in the US became more favorable during the second half of the 2000s.

== National Academies Guidelines for Human Embryonic Stem Cell Research ==
In 2005, the United States National Academies released its Guidelines for Human Embryonic Stem Cell Research. These Guidelines were prepared to enhance the integrity of human embryonic stem cell research in the public's perception and in actuality by encouraging responsible practices in the conduct of that research. The National Academies has subsequently named the Human Embryonic Stem Cell Research Advisory Committee to keep the Guidelines up-to-date.

The guidelines preserve two primary principles. First, that hESC research has the potential to improve our understanding of human health and discover new ways to treat illness. Second, that individuals donating embryos should do so freely, with voluntary and informed consent. The guidelines implement executive order 13505, and apply to hESC research receiving funds from the NIH. The guidelines detail safeguards to protect donating individuals by acquiring informed consent and protecting their identity. In addition, the guidelines contain multiple sections applying to embryos donated in the US and abroad, both before and after the effective date of the guidelines.

The NIH guidelines define which hESC research is eligible to receive NIH funding through a series of regulations which applicants for funding must adhere to. Applicants proposing research, may use stem cell lines that are posted on the NIH registry, or may submit an assurance of compliance with section II of the guidelines. Section II is applicable to stem cells derived from human embryos.

For the purposes of section II of the NIH guidelines, the following requirements must be met. First, the hESCs should have been derived from embryos created using an in vitro fertilization procedure for reproductive purposes, and no longer needed for this purpose. Second, the donors who sought reproductive treatment have given written consent for the embryos to be used for research purposes. Third, all written consent forms and other documentation must be provided.

Documentation must be provided regarding the following: All options available to the healthcare facility regarding the embryos in question were explained to the individual who sought reproductive treatment. No payments of any kind may be offered for the donated embryos. Policies and procedures must be in place at the facility where the embryos were donated to ensure that neither donation nor refusal to donate affects quality of care received by the patient.

There must also be a clear distinction between the donor's decision to create embryos for reproductive purposes, and the decision to donate embryos for research. This is ensured through a number of regulations which follow. First, the decision to create embryos for reproductive purposes must have been made without the influence of researchers proposing usage for the embryos to derive hESCs for research purposes. Consent for the donation of embryos should have been given at the time of donation. Finally, donors should have been informed that they have the right to withdraw consent at any time until derivation of stem cells from the embryo, or until the identity of the donor can no longer be linked to the embryo.

When seeking consent from the donor, they must be informed of what will become of their donation. The donor must be informed that the embryonic stem cells would be derived from the embryos from research purposes. The donor must also be informed of the procedures that the embryo would undergo in the derivation process, and that the stem cell lines derived from the embryo may be kept for many years. In addition, the donors must be informed that the donation is not made with direction regarding the intended use of the derived stem cells, and the research is not intended to provide direct medical benefit to the donor. The donor is also to be informed that there may be commercial potential resulting from the research performed, and that the donor is not to benefit from commercial development as a result of the donation. The donor is also to be notified if information that could disclose their identity will be available to the researchers.

Applicants seeking to use stem cell lines established before the effective date of the guidelines may use lines published on the NIH registry, or establish eligibility by complying with the requirements listed above. Alternately, researchers may submit materials to a working group of the Advisory Committee to the Director. The working group will review submitted materials and submit recommendations to the Advisory Committee, which will in turn make recommendations to the NIH director. A final decision regarding eligibility for funding is then made by the NIH director.

The materials submitted to the working group must demonstrate that the stem cells were derived from embryos created for reproductive purposes, and are no longer needed. Also, the materials must demonstrate that the stem cells were donated by donors who had granted voluntary written consent.

Research ineligible for NIH funding as dictated within the guidelines include research in which hESCs are introduced into non-human primate blastocysts. Research of the breeding of animals where hESCs may contribute to the germ line are similarly ineligible. NIH funding of the derivation of stem cells from human embryos is prohibited by the annual appropriations ban on the funding of human embryo research. Research using hESCs derived from other sources is also not eligible for funding.

== Timeline ==
- 1993 - As per the National Institutes of Health Revitalization Act, Congress and President Bill Clinton give the NIH direct authority to fund human embryo research for the first time.
- 1995 - The U.S. Congress passes an appropriations bill attached to which is a rider, the Dickey–Wicker Amendment which prohibited federally appropriated funds to be used for research where human embryos would be either created or destroyed. President Clinton signs the bill into law. This predates the creation of the first human embryonic stem cell lines.
- 1999 - After the creation of the first human embryonic stem cell lines in 1998 by James Thomson of the University of Wisconsin, Harriet Rabb, the top lawyer at the Department of Health and Human Services, releases a legal opinion that would set the course for Clinton Administration policy. Federal funds, obviously, could not be used to derive stem cell lines (because derivation involves embryo destruction). However, she concludes that because human embryonic stem cells "are not a human embryo within the statutory definition," the Dickey–Wicker Amendment does not apply to them. The NIH was therefore free to give federal funding to experiments involving the cells themselves. President Clinton strongly endorses the new guidelines, noting that human embryonic stem cell research promised "potentially staggering benefits." And with the guidelines in place, the NIH begins accepting grant proposals from scientists.
- 2001–2006 - On August 9, 2001, U.S. President George W. Bush signs an executive order which restricts federally funded stem cell research on embryonic stem cells to the already derived cell lines. He supports federal funding for embryonic stem cell research on the already existing lines of approximately $100 million, $250 million for research on adult and animal stem cells, and creates the President's Council on Bioethics led by Dr. Leon Kass of the University of Chicago to "monitor stem cell research, to recommend appropriate guidelines and regulations, and to consider all of the medical and ethical ramifications of biomedical innovation."
- November 2, 2004 - California voters approve Proposition 71, which provides $3 billion in state funds over ten years to human embryonic stem cell research.
- May 5, 2006 - Senator Rick Santorum introduces bill number S. 2754, or the Alternative Pluripotent Stem Cell Therapies Enhancement Act, into the U.S. Senate.
- July 18, 2006 - The U.S. Senate passes the Stem Cell Research Enhancement Act H.R. 810 and votes down Senator Santorum's S. 2754.
- July 19, 2006 - President George W. Bush vetoes House Resolution 810 Stem Cell Research Enhancement Act, a bill that would have reversed the Dickey–Wicker Amendment which made it illegal for federal money to be used for research where stem cells are derived from the destruction of an embryo.
- November 7, 2006 - The people of the U.S. state of Missouri passed Amendment 2, which allows usage of any stem cell research and therapy allowed under federal law, but prohibits human reproductive cloning.
- February 16, 2007 – The California Institute for Regenerative Medicine became the biggest financial backer of human embryonic stem cell research in the United States when they awarded nearly $45 million in research grants.
- November 4, 2008 - The people of the U.S. state of Michigan passed Proposal 08-2, allowing Michigan researchers to make embryonic stem cell cultures from excess embryos donated from fertility treatments.
- January 23, 2009 - The United States Food and Drug Administration approves clinical trials for human embryonic stem cell therapy.
- March 9, 2009 - President Barack Obama signs an executive order reversing federal opposition to embryonic Stem Cell research.
- August 2010 - Judge Royce Lamberth of the U.S. District Court for the District of Columbia issued a temporary injunction blocking the federal government from implementing the current NIH guidelines "...ruling that experiments with such cells fall under an "unambiguous" 1996 law by Congress that prohibits federal funding of research that destroys human embryos." This new injunction would not block new funding but it would also interfere with the research allowed under the Bush administration
- April 2011 - See Dickey–Wicker Amendment, "In the 2-1 opinion of April 29, 2011, the appeals panel said that the Dickey–Wicker Amendment was "ambiguous" and that the National Institutes of Health had "reasonably concluded" that although federal funds could not be used to directly destroy an embryo, the amendment does not prohibit funding a research project using embryonic stem cells. This is an important distinction under the law, because for federal funds to be used directly to support the destruction of embryos."

== See also ==
- Christian views on cloning
- Ira Black, stem cell advocate
- Stem cell laws
- Stem cell controversy
- Stem cell laws and policy in Iran
