= Political positions of Norm Coleman =

The political positions of Norm Coleman have changed dramatically over his career. Originally a Democrat and an anti-war activist as a university student during the Vietnam War, Coleman has since switched parties and is now generally considered a moderate Republican.

On social issues, Coleman is largely conservative, opposing abortion, same-sex marriage, and the use of embryonic stem cells. On foreign policy and security, Coleman supported the U.S.-led 2003 invasion of Iraq and continues to support the Iraq War and the war on terror. He also generally favors stronger domestic security over civil liberty concerns. Fiscally, Coleman has supported greater federal spending than more conservative Republicans.

Coleman has voted inline with the Republican Party approximately 85% of the time.

In March 2016, Coleman called the 2016 Republican nominee Donald Trump "a fraud".

== Fiscal policy ==
=== Domestic economy ===
In February 2008, Coleman voted for the Economic Stimulus Act of 2008.

=== Pork barrel spending ===
Citizens Against Government Waste has given Coleman a lifetime rating of 38%. The Club for Growth gave him a 33% "RePORK Card" rating for the year of 2007. Both scores denote a generally weak stance towards fighting pork barrel spending.

=== CAFTA ===
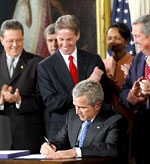
Picture of Coleman, President Bush, and others at CAFTA signing

Senator Coleman expressed reservations about supporting the Central American Free Trade Agreement (CAFTA) unless the interests of the domestic U.S. sugar industry (including Minnesota's sugar beet industry) were accommodated.

He voted in favor of CAFTA after obtaining quotas imposed on foreign sugar until 2008. He stood behind President Bush on August 2, 2005, as the trade agreement was signed into law. "This is a 3 year insurance policy that I have purchased for my sugar farmers..." he said.

=== Drilling in the Arctic National Wildlife Refuge, Environment ===
On December 11, 2005 Senator Coleman voted in favor of invoking cloture on, thus advancing, a defense appropriations bill that included oil exploration in the Arctic National Wildlife Refuge (ANWR) after having pledged in 2002 to oppose such drilling. He stated that he did so because although he planned to vote against the bill, he didn't believe that a filibuster was warranted. In spite of this, many environmental advocacy groups (most notably the Sierra Club) viewed his vote as a betrayal of his promise. His vote notwithstanding, the filibuster held, and Coleman voted to strip the ANWR provision from the bill in a subsequent vote. Sen. Coleman received a score of 33% for 2007 from the League of Conservation Voters for taking the pro-environment position in just five of fourteen cases.

== Foreign policy ==
=== Iraq ===
Coleman supported the U.S.-led 2003 invasion of Iraq, saying at the time, "Saddam is a menace. His menace grows with each passing day. History will judge us harshly if knowing what we know, we fail to act with bipartisan solidarity to prevent the death of hundreds of thousands." Since then, Coleman has repeatedly voted against setting a timetable for withdrawing U.S. troops from Iraq.

On January 22, 2007 Coleman, along with fellow Republican Senators John Warner and Susan Collins, joined the bipartisan opposition to President Bush's Iraq War troop surge of 2007.

=== Iran ===
On September 26, 2007, Coleman voted to designate Iran's Quds Force as a terrorist organization.

=== Torture ===
In 2008, Coleman agreed that waterboarding was a form of torture, but opposed a measure that would have outlawed its use by the CIA. The specific legislation would have limited the CIA to interrogation techniques outlined in the Army Field Manual.

== Social policy ==
=== Abortion, stem-cell research, and Schiavo case ===
Senator Coleman has campaigned as an anti-abortion candidate since at least 1993. In 2006, Coleman was given a 0% rating by NARAL Pro-Choice America and a 100% rating by the National Right to Life Committee indicating a consistent anti-abortion voting record. Coleman attributes his position on abortion to the death of two of his four children in infancy from a rare genetic disease. He supports limiting stem cell research to adult stem cells and stem cells derived from umbilical cord blood, and, in July 2006, he voted against lifting restrictions on federal research dollars for new embryonic stem cell lines. Senator Coleman voted in favor of intervention in the Terri Schiavo case.

=== LGBT equality ===
Coleman opposes recognition of same-sex marriages by either the federal or state governments. In his 2002 Senate campaign, Coleman pledged to support an amendment to the United States Constitution that would ban any state from recognizing same-sex marriage. In 2004 and in June 2006, he voted in favour of such an amendment.

When he was mayor, Coleman refused to sign a city proclamation celebrating the annual gay pride festival, explaining his opposition: "What we have had in St. Paul and Minneapolis for many years is signing a joint proclamation making it gay/lesbian/bisexual/transgender month. I will say that I support human rights... And of course that includes sexual orientation. On the other hand, I've felt very strongly that is wasn't government's responsibility to give proclamations for people's sexuality. I don't think government has a responsibility to issue awards for one's sexuality." Accordingly, Coleman hired Susan Kimberly, a trans woman, to be his deputy mayor in 1998. Kimberly also worked as Coleman’s Minnesota Senate Office as State Director.

=== Immigration ===
Coleman voted in favor of the Secure Fence Act of 2006 to extend the border fence along the United States–Mexico border.

=== Civil liberties ===
For the years of 2005-2006, Coleman was given a 17% rating by the American Civil Liberties Union indicating a weak civil liberties record (by the ACLU's definitions).

Coleman supported the REAL ID Act. He also voted in favor of the Military Commissions Act of 2006 which, among other things, suspended habeas corpus for "unlawful enemy combatants" detained by the U.S. In 2007, he co-sponsored the Violent Radicalization and Homegrown Terrorism Prevention Act of 2007. He also voted to grant legal immunity to telecom corporations that cooperated with the NSA warrantless surveillance program.

=== Gun rights ===
In 2002, Coleman received an A grade from the National Rifle Association. In 2006, he received a 100% rating from Gun Owners of America.

== See also ==
- Stop Trump movement
