= Stem cell laws and policy in Iran =

Iran's flexible approach towards stem-cell research is linked to the Shia tradition being flexible enough to allow for ESCs science; the second is that the approval of ESCs research was made easier by permissive laws governing other areas of biomedicine, such as new assisted reproductive technologies; and the third is that Iran's lack of a public discussion of bioscience affects how its ESCs research policy is seen.

In 2002 a fatwa was issued by the Supreme Leader of Iran regarding the permissibility of "destruction of residual embryos from the in vitro fertilization cycle for the purpose of obtaining stem cells for research purposes" as accreditation for the country's ESCs scientific community. Following this positive fatwa, the stem cell department of the Royan Institute in Tehran was established in the same year to establish the ESCs lines and to develop techniques to differentiate these lineages into various mature cell types including cardiomyocytes, B cells, and neurons.

== Cultural and sociological context ==
In the case of Iran, the introduction of the Islamic system appears to have forced religious scholars to assume an unprecedented role of responsibility and engagement. Social Planning and Public Health. The large-scale crises may partially explain why religious scholars quoted Maslahat and Istihsan in their decisions on medicine and health problems rather than looking at those problems in isolation or in the theoretical sense as it happened in the past.

The financial burden of devastating diseases is also at the heart of hESC research decisions in Iran. This may have given Shia scholars a boost to reconsider the degenerative and public health implications of terminal disorders or economic hardships causing serious and long-lasting illnesses for individuals, families, and society. The eight-year Iran-Iraq war has left the country with a large disabled community, due in part to spinal cord injuries, which has been an intense motivation for Iran to start many cell therapy research projects.

Even in developing countries (e.g. Iran), home cell therapy and regenerative medicine are cost-effective solutions for the growing number of patients with chronic diseases including diabetes, heart disease, and hepatitis blood diseases such as thalassemia, which are relatively common.

== Sanctions ==
Although Iran has a liberal domestic regulatory environment and its scientists are well-funded, the country cannot import scientific equipment and materials that most stem cell scientists use on a daily basis. This is largely due to trade sanctions imposed on Iran by other countries, including the United States and the European Community, which ban the export of certain scientific equipment to Iran and require other special export permits.

== See also ==
- Stem cell laws and policy in China
- Stem cell laws
- Stem cell controversy
- Stem cell laws and policy in the United States
