= Stem-cell line =

Culture of stem cells that can be propagated indefinitely

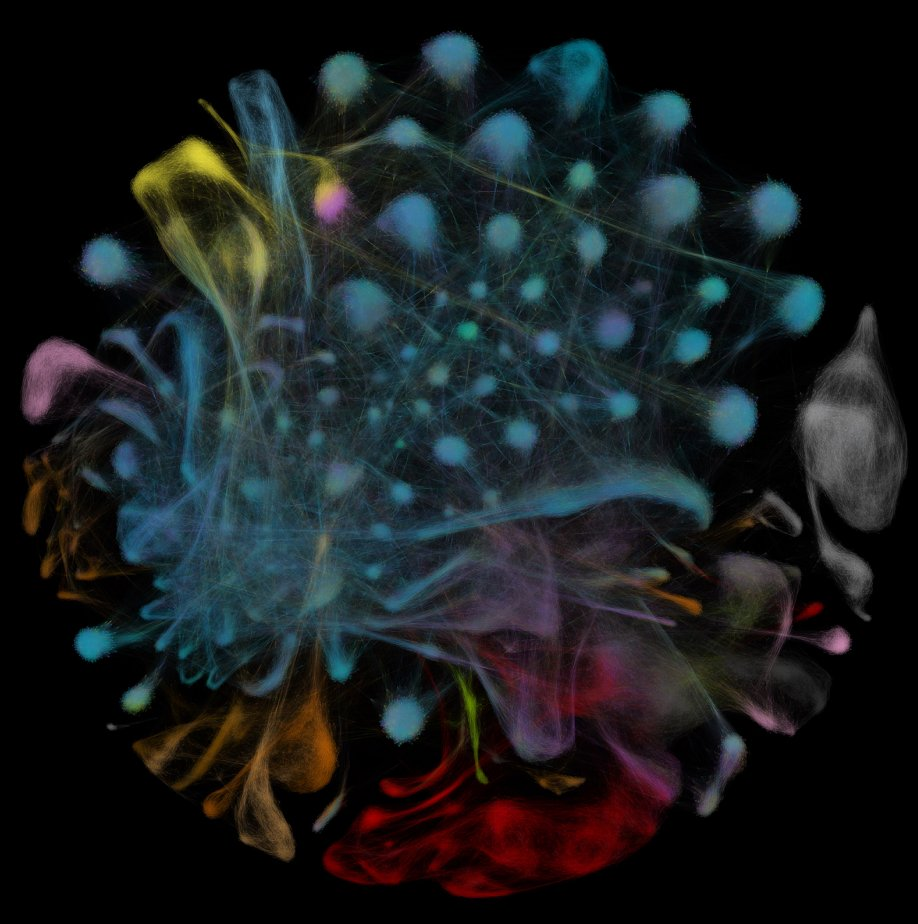
Roughly 100,000 cells from rhesus macaques, grouped by similarity. Each colour highlights cells from a different tissue, e.g. thymus and lymph nodes (shades of blue), bone marrow (red), blood (white), tonsil (yellow), gut (shades of brown), brain (grey), liver (green), spleen (purple) and lung (pink).

A stem cell line is a group of stem cells that is cultured in vitro and can be propagated indefinitely. Stem cell lines are derived from either animal or human tissues and come from one of three sources: embryonic stem cells, adult stem cells, or induced pluripotent stem cells. They are commonly used in research and regenerative medicine.

== Properties ==
By definition, stem cells possess two properties: (1) they can self-renew, which means that they can divide indefinitely while remaining in an undifferentiated state; and (2) they are pluripotent or multipotent, which means that they can differentiate to form specialized cell types. Due to the self-renewal capacity of stem cells, a stem cell line can be cultured in vitro indefinitely.

A stem-cell line is distinctly different from an immortalized cell line, such as the HeLa line. While stem cells can propagate indefinitely in culture due to their inherent properties, immortalized cells would not normally divide indefinitely but have gained this ability due to mutation. Immortalized cell lines can be generated from cells isolated from tumors, or mutations can be introduced to make the cells immortal.

A stem cell line is also distinct from primary cells. Primary cells are cells that have been isolated and then used immediately. Primary cells cannot divide indefinitely and thus cannot be cultured for long periods of time in vitro.

== Types and methods of derivation ==
=== Embryonic stem cell line ===
An embryonic stem cell line is created from cells derived from the inner cell mass of a blastocyst, an early stage, pre-implantation embryo. In humans, the blastocyst stage occurs 4–5 days post fertilization. To create an embryonic stem cell line, the inner cell-mass is removed from the blastocyst, separated from the trophoectoderm, and cultured on a layer of supportive cells in vitro. In the derivation of human embryonic stem cell lines, embryos left over from in vitro fertilization (IVF) procedures are used. The fact that the blastocyst is destroyed during the process has raised controversy and ethical concerns.

Embryonic stem cells are pluripotent, meaning they can differentiate to form all cell types in the body. In vitro, embryonic stem cells can be cultured under defined conditions to keep them in their pluripotent state, or they can be stimulated with biochemical and physical cues to differentiate them to different cell types.

=== Adult stem cell line ===
Adult stem cells are found in juvenile or adult tissues. Adult stem cells are multipotent: they can generate a limited number of differentiated cell types (unlike pluripotent embryonic stem cells). Types of adult stem cells include hematopoietic stem cells and mesenchymal stem cells. Hematopoietic stem cells are found in the bone marrow and generate all cells of the immune system all blood cell types. Mesenchymal stem cells are found in umbilical cord blood, amniotic fluid, and adipose tissue and can generate a number of cell types, including osteoblasts, chondrocytes, and adipocytes. In medicine, adult stem cells are mostly commonly used in bone marrow transplants to treat many bone and blood cancers as well as some autoimmune diseases. (See Hematopoietic stem cell transplantation)

Of the types of adult stem cells have successfully been isolated and identified, only mesenchymal stem cells can successfully be grown in culture for long periods of time. Other adult stem cell types, such as hematopoietic stem cells, are difficult to grow and propagate in vitro. Identifying methods for maintaining hematopoietic stem cells in vitro is an active area of research. Thus, while mesenchymal stem cell lines exist, other types of adult stem cells that are grown in vitro can better be classified as primary cells.

=== Induced pluripotent stem-cell (iPSC) line ===
Induced pluripotent stem cell (iPSC) lines are pluripotent stem cells that have been generated from adult/somatic cells. The method of generating iPSCs was developed by Shinya Yamanaka's lab in 2006; his group demonstrated that the introduction of four specific genes could induce somatic cells to revert to a pluripotent stem cell state.

Compared to embryonic stem-cell lines, iPSC lines are also pluripotent in nature but can be derived without the use of human embryos—a process that has raised ethical concerns. Furthermore, patient-specific iPSC cell lines can be generated—that is, cell lines that are genetically matched to an individual. Patient-specific iPSC lines have been generated for the purposes of studying diseases and for developing patient-specific medical therapies.

== Methods of culture ==
Stem-cell lines are grown and maintained at specific temperature and atmospheric conditions (37 degrees Celsius and 5% CO_{2}) in incubators. Culture conditions such as the cell growth medium and surface on which cells are grown vary widely depending on the specific stem cell line. Different biochemical factors can be added to the medium to control the cell phenotype—for example to keep stem cells in a pluripotent state or to differentiate them to a specific cell type.

== Uses ==
Stem-cell lines are used in research and regenerative medicine. They can be used to study stem-cell biology and early human development. In the field of regenerative medicine, it has been proposed that stem cells be used in cell-based therapies to replace injured or diseased cells and tissues. Examples of conditions that researchers are working to develop stem-cell-based treatments for include neurodegenerative diseases, diabetes, and spinal cord injuries.

Stem-cell in-vitro

Stem cells could be used as an ideal in vitro platform to study developmental changes at the molecular level. Neural stem cells (NSC) for examples have been used as a model to study the mechanisms behind the differentiation and maturation of cells of the central nervous system (CNS). These studies are gaining more attention recently since they can be optimised and relevant to modelling neurodegenerative diseases and brain tumors.

== Ethical issues ==
There is controversy associated with the derivation and use of human embryonic stem cell lines. This controversy stems from the fact that derivation of human embryonic stem cells requires the destruction of a blastocyst-stage, pre-implantation human embryo. There is a wide range of viewpoints regarding the moral consideration that blastocyst-stage human embryos should be given.

== Access to human embryonic stem-cell lines ==
=== United States ===
In the United States, Executive Order 13505 established that federal money can be used for research in which approved human embryonic stem-cell (hESC) lines are used, but it cannot be used to derive new lines. The National Institutes of Health (NIH) Guidelines on Human Stem Cell Research, effective July 7, 2009, implemented the Executive Order 13505 by establishing criteria which hESC lines must meet to be approved for funding. The NIH Human Embryonic Stem Cell Registry can be accessed online and has updated information on cell lines eligible for NIH funding. There are 486 approved lines as of January 2022.

Studies have found that approved hESC lines are not uniformly used in the US data from cell banks and surveys of researchers indicate that only a handful of the available hESC lines are routinely used in research. Access and utility are cited as the two primary factors influencing what hESC lines scientists choose to work with.

A 2011 survey of stem cell scientists in the US who use hESC lines in their research found that 54% of respondents used two or fewer lines and 75% used three or fewer lines.

Another study tracked cell-line requests fulfilled from the largest US repositories, the National Stem Cell Bank (NSCB) and the Harvard Stem Cell Institute (HSCI; Cambridge, MA, USA), for the periods March 1999 – December 2008 (for NSCB) and April 2004 – December 2008 (for HSCI). For NSCB, out of twenty-one approved cell lines, 77% of requests were for two of the lines (H1 and H9). For HSCI, out of the 17 lines requested more than once, 24.7% of requests were for the two most commonly requested lines.

== See also ==
- Stem cell
- Embryonic stem cell
- Induced pluripotent stem cell
- Adult stem cell
- Cell culture
- Immortalised cell line
- Stem-cell controversy
- Regenerative Medicine
