= Christian views on cloning =

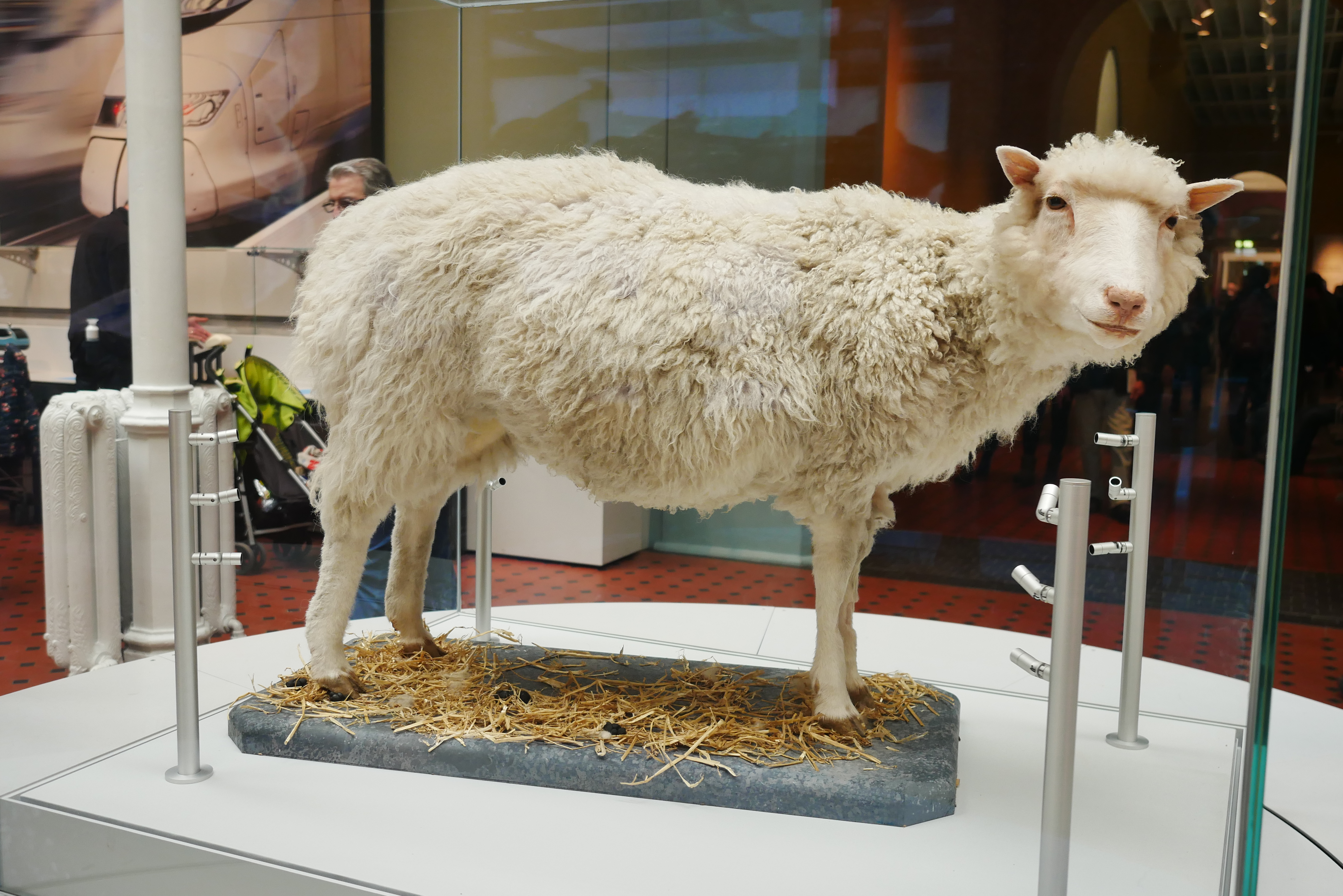
The first mammal to be cloned from an adult somatic cell, a sheep named Dolly.

Christians take multiple positions in the debate on the morality of human cloning. Since Dolly the sheep was successfully cloned on 5 July 1996, and the possibility of cloning humans became a reality, Christian leaders have been pressed to take an ethical stance on its morality. Whilst the majority of mainline Christian denominations disagree with human cloning, such as Roman Catholics and fundamentalist denominations, including Southern Baptists, the views taken by various other Christian denominations can vary, particularly regarding therapeutic uses. There are often few statements from Christian churches regarding the morality of cloning.

There are certain Protestant denominations that do not disagree with the acceptability of human cloning. Mary Seller, for example, a member of the Church of England's Board of Social Responsibility and a professor of developmental genetics, states, "Cloning, like all science, must be used responsibly. Cloning humans is not desirable. But cloning sheep has its uses." On the other hand, according to a survey of Christian fundamentalist pastors, responses indicated a "common account of human cloning as primarily reproductive in nature, proscribed by its violation of God's will and role." Many of these pastors acknowledged the reason for this violation being rooted in the religiously motivated view that human cloning is an example of scientists 'playing God.'" It is not only this that many Christians are concerned about, however; other concerns include whether the dignity of the human person is overlooked, as well as the role of the parents as co-creators. All of these things may contribute to why many fundamentalist Christian pastors see human reproductive cloning as simply "forbidden territory."

== Understanding cloning ==
Some scientists do argue that the plurality of views comes from the differing understandings of what exactly human cloning is. In Weasel and Jensen's survey on "Language and Values," they found that Christian pastors used a "consistent emphasis on DNA." Scientists describing the same processes used terminology such as, "insert an isolated nucleus from the donor to produce a dividing and viable embryo" into an enucleated egg" One reason why Christian fundamentalist pastors would be more apt to use terminology which includes "DNA" more prominently is that DNA is a "value-laden" term which carries religious significance. Therefore, not only is DNA often equated, in religious circles, with one's genetic identity, but also with one's singular, "God-given" identity.

=== Therapeutic cloning ===
Another point of misunderstanding arises in the separation of human reproductive cloning and therapeutic cloning. While most Christians do not support reproductive cloning, therapeutic cloning is a branch of cloning which has garnered slightly more support from certain denominations. Some Christian traditions, such as the United Church of Christ, believe that cloning can be conducted ethically for this purpose, in order to help treat disease and improve the public health, as they do not see the fertilized ovum as constituting a person. Courtney Campbell, director of the Program for Ethics, Science and the Environment at Oregon State University, says, "Some traditions and leading figures in conservative Protestantism who were opposed to human cloning for reproductive reasons have come to see that given the ambiguity about their own views about the status of embryonic life, and given the potential for health benefits, they could be opposed to reproductive cloning, but affirm therapeutic cloning. The main reason, she says, is the tradition of emphasizing individual choice over central dogma.

Catholic support for therapeutic cloning is conditional on the stipulation that it does not involve any kind of infringement upon human embryos. John Paul II states, "These techniques, insofar as they involve the manipulation and destruction of human embryos, are not morally acceptable, even when their proposed goal is good in itself." Thus, according to the Catholic ethical system, even a good that might come from therapeutic cloning would be morally unacceptable, as it would be the result of an act which, according to Catholics, is itself intrinsically immoral. This, for many Christians, is hard to abide by, for, as one Professor of Christian Ethics states, "Our society is preoccupied with death and the pursuit of health seems to justify anything."

The Church of England put out a statement on the Church's website which reads, "human reproductive cloning was made unlawful by the Human Fertilisation and Embryology Act 1990. Few members of the Church of England would dissent from such a position. However, therapeutic cloning may be thought of as ethical, as it does not result in another human being." Thus, while reproductive cloning is again discouraged, therapeutic cloning is more acceptable.

In a statement given by the Lutheran Church–Missouri Synod, on the other hand, therapeutic cloning was rejected as "contrary to the Word of God and our 1998 resolution". For this particular group, therapeutic cloning is assumed to involve the destruction of human embryos, and is therefore against the synod's resolution to "reaffirm and celebrate life" and "protect the sanctity of human life".

== Dignity of the human person ==
Christian organizations are challenged to respond to a number of concerns about the issue of the dignity of the human person, especially in relation to scientific study. Much of the debate has to do with the question of at what point the soul enters the body. Catholics believe that the soul enters the body at the moment of conception when the sperm and egg unite. Thus, Catholics and other Christian denominations that share this belief may see embryonic cloning as tantamount to live human experimentation and therefore contrary to God's will.

Most Christians believe that a person has intrinsic dignity based on his being created in the image and likeness of God and in his call to communion with God.

=== Defining dignity ===
Many Christians that do not agree on an exact definition of dignity, which leads some scientists to ignore this concern, seeing it as a vague excuse that some Christians use to justify cloning bans Or, if a definition is agreed upon, it may be challenged as being too weak, so that, according to Steven Pinker, a Professor of Psychology at Harvard University, it is "hardly up to the heavyweight moral demands assigned to it".

The belief in intrinsic dignity, nonetheless, leads the Christians who hold this belief to also argue that if the soul enters the body at the moment when the sperm and the egg unite, producing cloned zygotes that are unlikely to survive is equivalent to murder. Therefore, if one believes, as Catholics do, that the zygotes have souls and are therefore human, in the words of John Paul II, "regardless of the objective for which it was done, human embryonic cloning conflicts with the international legal norms that protect human dignity." Some Christian conservatives even express concern that cloned embryos would have no soul, since it is, in their view, born outside of God's parameters, as its creation is in a laboratory setting rather than natural conception.

Certain Christians also hold that, in the act of creating a human being, his or her dignity is also upheld by the presence of a loving union between the two partners, so that "only when love exists should the creation of other persons be envisaged." Because of this, "divine creation and co-creation are similar". In the act of scientific cloning, however, the embryo is a result of the artificial union of the sperm and the egg, so that "the presence of love between the co-creators does not exist." Thus, according to this view, the dignity of the person is not upheld. Rev. Demetri Demopulos, Greek Orthodox pastor and geneticist, states, "As an Orthodox Christian, I speak out in opposition to any attempt to clone a human being because humans are supposed to be created by acts of love between two people, not through the manipulation of cells in acts that are ultimately about self-love."

=== Playing God ===
Much of the concern related to human cloning stems from a fear of overstepping the bounds of the natural order. Through the act of creating another human being, Christians have also posed the question as to whether this would be too much like playing God. Not only this, but some Christian ethicists argue that human cloning would "create substantial issues of identity and individuality". This could be seen through the confusion of the child resulting from cloning as to who his parents are, what connection he has to his genetic duplicate, etc.

=== Role of cloning in society ===
Despite the ethical gray area surrounding the act of cloning itself, most, if not all Christians, still hold that children who may result from the process should be loved and cared for as much as any other child, since they would be considered fully human and therefore reflect the Divine image, as defined by Gaudium et spes, a document of the Second Vatican Council. However, according to Richard McCormick, S.J., cloning disrupts the familial order. It "would involve removing insemination and fertilization from the marriage relationship, and it would also remove one of the partners from the entire process". According to Stephen G. Post, a Catholic journalist, "[removal] of the male impregnators from the procreative dyad would simply drive the nail into the coffin of fatherhood, unless one thinks that biological and social fatherhood are utterly disconnected".

== Quotes ==
Rev. Demetri Demopulos, Greek Orthodox pastor and geneticist:

"As an Orthodox Christian, I speak out in opposition to any attempt to clone a human being because humans are supposed to be created by acts of love between two people, not through the manipulation of cells in acts that are ultimately about self-love."

Richard McCormick, a Jesuit priest and professor of Christian ethics at the University of Notre Dame:

"I can’t think of a morally acceptable reason to clone a human being."

Mary Seller, a member of Church of England's Board of Social Responsibility and a professor of developmental genetics:

"the antics of a few cranks and Hitler types" should not interfere with such research. "Cloning, like all science, must be used responsibly. Cloning humans is not desirable. But cloning sheep has its uses."

Pope John Paul II in an address to the 18th International Congress of the Transplantation Society.

"I am thinking in particular of attempts at human cloning with a view to obtaining organs for transplants: these techniques, insofar as they involve the manipulation and destruction of human embryos, are not morally acceptable, even when their proposed goal is good in itself. Science itself points to other forms of therapeutic intervention which would not involve cloning or the use of embryonic cells, but rather would make use of stem cells taken from adults. This is the direction that research must follow if it wishes to respect the dignity of each and every human being, even at the embryonic stage."

United Church of Christ Committee on Genetics:

"It is very likely that [with nuclear transfer cloning], scientists could learn a great deal about basic human developmental biology and that this knowledge might someday lead to treatments for degenerative conditions or to counteract some forms of sterility. ... Various General Synods of the United Church of Christ have regarded the human pre-embryo as due great respect [but not] regarded the pre-embryo as the equivalent of a person. Therefore, we ... do not object categorically to human pre-embryo research [under certain conditions]."

Ben Mitchellin, assistant professor of Christian ethics at Southern Baptist Theological Seminary:

"The time is right for an outright ban on the production of cloned human embryos from fertilization to birth, regardless of how the research is funded. The vast majority of the American public favors a ban on both privately funded and publicly funded research."

== See also ==
- Stem cell law
- Stem cell controversy
- Ethics of cloning
