= Stem cell laws and policy in China =

The laws and policies regarding stem cell research in the People's Republic of China are relatively relaxed in comparison to that of other nations. The reason for this is due to different traditional and cultural views in relation to that of the West.

== Laws and regulations ==
China has one of the most unrestrictive embryonic stem cell research policies in the world. In recent years, seeing the research opportunities that China's lax regulations provide, many expatriate Chinese scientists from the West are returning to China to establish stem cell research centers and laboratories there.

As a result of the increased interest in this field of research, in 2003, the People's Republic of China Ministry of Science and Technology and Ministry of Health issued official ethical guidelines for human embryonic stem cell research in its territories. The guidelines strictly forbid any research aimed at human reproductive cloning and require that the embryos used for stem cell research come only from:

1. Spared gamete or blastocyst after in vitro fertilization (IVF) procedures;
2. Fetal cells from accidental spontaneous or voluntarily selected abortions;
3. Blastocyst or parthenogenetic split blastocyst obtained by somatic cell nuclear transfer technology; or
4. Germ cells voluntarily donated.

American scientific journals Science and Nature have both reported in recent years that China's stem cell programs hold potential, and in 2004 a delegation from Britain's Department of Trade and Industry concluded more emphatically that Chinese research in the field was already world-class. Funding for stem cell research by the Chinese government is extremely limited compared to Western nations, with the Chinese Ministry of Science and Technology planning to devote between US$33 million and US$132 million on stem cell research during the next 5 years. By contrast, the state of California alone has earmarked US$3 billion to fund stem cell research at California institutions during the next decade. However, it is simply cheaper to produce goods in China than in nearly any other country, and in sophisticated sectors such as medical research, the cost advantage is likely to be retained for quite some time.

On January 10, 2012, it was announced that China will halt new applications for clinical trials of stem-cell products until July 1 as part of a year-long campaign to regulate the development of the industry. Deng Haihua, the Ministry of Health's spokesman, said "Trials that haven’t been approved should be stopped."

== Cultural views ==
Perhaps more importantly, the cultural and national attitude on stem cell research differs greatly between China and the West. Most Chinese citizens do not view the embryo as containing any inherent moral value. According to the accepted Confucian view, a person begins with birth; a person is an entity that has a body or shape and psyche, and has rational, emotional and social-relational capacity for a lifetime of learning and innovation. Therefore, to the Chinese, a human embryo, lacking the characteristics of a person, cannot be equated morally to a person or a personal life. Stem cell research in China thus is unlikely ever to be prone to the intense Christian moral values in the West, especially so from the US, one of the largest Christian countries. China's distinctive attitude toward the embryo, combined with its lax regulatory system, will potentially help its researchers to not be hindered when pursuing laboratory science and medical application in stem cell therapy developments.

== See also ==
- Stem cell laws and policy in Iran
