= United States v. Regenerative Sciences, LLC =

- Court: United States Court of Appeals for the District of Columbia Circuit
- Full case name: United States of America v. Regenerative Sciences, LLC, et al.
- Argued: October 21, 2013
- Decided: February 4, 2014
- Citation: 741 F.3d 1314

Court membership
- Judges sitting: Thomas B. Griffith, Sri Srinivasan, Harry T. Edwards

Case opinions
- Majority: Griffith, joined by a unanimous court

Laws applied
- Food, Drug and Cosmetic Act, 21 U.S.C. § 301 et seq.; Public Health Service Act, 42 U.S.C. § 201 et seq.

United States of America v. Regenerative Sciences, LLC, 741 F.3d 1314 (D.C. Cir. 2014), was a decision in the United States Court of Appeals for the District of Columbia Circuit filed on February 4, 2014 concerning more than minimally manipulated cell therapies and whether they are considered part of medical practice or a drug, the latter subjecting it to regulation under the Food and Drug Administration (FDA). Regenerative Sciences LLC marketed a therapy procedure called Regenexx-C for the treatment of arthritis and orthopedic injury that involved extraction and culture of mesenchymal stem cells from the same patient which were later reinjected. In 2008, The FDA notified Regenerative Sciences LLC that the procedure may not be in compliance with their regulation using an Untitled Letter, which began a series of suits and counter suits, leading to the 2014 decision upholding the FDA’s regulation of more than minimally manipulated stem cell therapies.

== Regenexx-C Procedure ==
The Regenexx-C Procedure was developed by Regenerative Sciences LLC and offered as a treatment for arthritis and other orthopedic conditions. The procedure involves extracting mesenchymal stem cells from a sample of the patient's bone marrow or synovial fluid. These cells are then cultured in the patient's autologous platelet lysate, allowed to proliferate, and mixed with an antibiotic before being reinjected into the same patient at the site of orthopedic injury. This is quite different from the medical procedures the company now offers, which are all fully 21 CFR 1271.15(b) compliant.

== History ==
In the late 1990s FDA proposed regulating more than minimally manipulated (MAS Cells) cells as drugs. Public hearings were held which led to significant opposition from industry, professional groups, and academia. For example, the American Red Cross submitted written testimony that it opposed the FDA's position that cells should be regulated as drugs, instead proposing they be regulated as medical devices. The American Society of Clinical Oncology stated in their written testimony, "ASCO objects in the strongest terms to FDA's proposed regulation of stem cell transplants. This misguided proposal is unnecessary, would jeopardize the proper treatment of cancer patients and impede the development of new therapies, would substantially increase the cost of stem cell transplants, and exceeds FDA's legal authority." Northwestern University also opposed this new regulatory schema, as did other groups such as the Biotechnology Industry Organization, Reprogenesis, Osiris Therapeutics, and the Society for Assisted Reproductive Technology.

In 2005-6, Regenerative Sciences obtained multiple legal opinions that their planned use of autologous, cultured bone marrow in their own patients was the practice of medicine. In 2006, the FDA made a one word change in its 21 CFR 1271 regulations, changing the wording from "into another human" to "into a human", thereby extending its regulatory authority over autologous stem cell therapies. In 2007 Regenerative began offering the cultured stem cell service to patients. In July 2008, Regenerative received an Untitled letter from the Food and Drug Administration Center for Biological Evaluation and Research which stated the Regenexx-C Procedure may not in compliance with the Federal Food, Drug, and Cosmetic Act and the Public Health Service Act. Regenerative responded in writing and asked for an administrative hearing with the FDA on the issue, which was denied. In 2009, Regenerative sued FDA in Denver District Court over the issue of whether the FFDCA allowed the FDA to regulate a small medical practice like a drug manufacturer. FDA claimed in court documents that it had not yet taken "final agency action" on the matter. As a result, judge Wiley Daniels ruled that the case was not ripe for judicial review.

In August 2010, The FDA filed for an injunction that would prohibit Regenerative Sciences from continuing to provide the Regenexx-C Procedure. Regenerative advanced a counterclaim holding that the Regenexx-C Procedure should not be subject to FDA regulation because, as a medical procedure, it is not a drug but part of the practice of medicine. Further, they argued that if it was found to fall within federal regulation, then it would still be found exempt of manufacturing and labeling requirements of the Federal Food, Drug, and Cosmetic Act. The U.S. District Court for the District of Columbia rejected the counterclaim and upheld the injunction. Regenerative Sciences appealed.

== Controversy ==
Several former FDA chiefs did not believe that it was in the best interest of patients and the FDA for the agency to regulate autologous cells as drugs. Notably, former FDA chief Andrew von Eschenbach opined that, "The FDA alleged that the cells the firm used had been manipulated to the point that they should be regulated as drugs. A resulting court injunction halting use of the technique has cast a pall over the future of regenerative medicine." In addition, former FDA deputy chief Scott Gottlieb voiced a similar opinion that "A recent decision by a federal trial court gave the Food and Drug Administration the latitude that the agency has long sought to regulate our cells as drugs. It could put the brakes on one of the most promising areas of medical research." Boston College legal scholar, Mary Anne Chirba, writing in the Journal of Health and Biomedical law, opined that while FDA would likely prevail in the Regenerative case, the agency needed to revisit its attempts to regulate autologous cells as prescription drugs. Finally, NYU law professor Richard Epstein produced a policy statement entitled, "The FDA’s Misguided Regulation of Stem-Cell Procedures: How Administrative Overreach Blocks Medical Innovation" where he opined that FDA should have no regulatory authority over medical procedures including those involving cells.

One of the issues cited by FDA in court documents was that Regenerative had failed to seek approval for its biologic drug and that it was not manufactured according to pharmaceutical company cGMP guidelines. Regenerative had published two safety papers on the procedure. The first was a 227 patient experience and the second was based on 339 patients. In addition, Peeters, et al. had published an independent review of the Regenerative source data on safety and concluded that the procedure was safer than commonly used Hyaluronic Acid injections.

== Decision ==
On February 4, 2014, the United States Court of Appeals for the District of Columbia Circuit affirmed the district court’s injunction against Regenerative Sciences’ use of the Regenexx-C Procedure and also dismissed the counterclaims. The court found that the stem cell mixture used in the procedure fell well within the Federal Food, Drug, and Cosmetic Act’s definition of a drug and, by extension, a biological product, thereby triggering federal regulations. The counterclaim holding that the procedure was not a drug but part of the practice of medicine was rejected by the court, who emphasized that the mixture itself was the subject of the case, and that it is still considered a drug and biological product even when used in the practice of medicine. The court also found that the mixture used in Regenexx-C could not be exempted from manufacturing and labeling requirements of the Federal Food, Drug, and Cosmetic Act as a compound drug because mesenchymal stem cells have not been FDA-approved as components for use in compound drugs. Having rejected the counterclaims and establishing that the Regenexx-C mixture is both a drug and subject to FDA regulation, the court then found that these regulations had been violated, and upheld the injunction.

== Impact ==
It remains to be seen what the long term impacts of this ruling will be. However, critics opposed to the FDA’s authority to regulate cell therapies express concern that this will discourage clinics and other companies interested in working with more than minimally manipulated stem cells from operating in the United States free of regulation.
