= Stem cell laws =

Laws governing the use or isolation of human stem cells

Stem cell laws are the law rules, and policy governance concerning the sources, research, and uses in treatment of stem cells in humans. These laws have been the source of much controversy and vary significantly by country. In the European Union, stem cell research using the human embryo is permitted in Sweden, Spain, Finland, Belgium, Greece, Britain, Denmark and the Netherlands; however, it is illegal in Germany, Austria, Ireland, Italy, and Portugal. The issue has similarly divided the United States, with several states enforcing a complete ban and others giving support. Elsewhere, Japan, India, Iran, Israel, South Korea, China, and Australia are supportive. However, New Zealand, most of Africa (except South Africa), and most of South America (except Brazil) are restrictive.

== Science background ==
The information presented here covers the legal implications of embryonic stem cells (ES), rather than induced pluripotent stem cells (iPSCs). The laws surrounding the two differ because while both have similar capacities in differentiation, their modes of derivation are not. While embryonic stem cells are taken from embryoblasts, induced pluripotent stem cells are undifferentiated from somatic adult cells.

Stem cells are cells found in most, if not all, multi-cellular organisms. A common example of a stem cell is the hematopoietic stem cell (HSC) which are multipotent stem cells that give rise to cells of the blood lineage. In contrast to multipotent stem cells, embryonic stem cells are pluripotent and are thought to be able to give rise to all cells of the body. Embryonic stem cells were isolated in mice in 1981, and in humans in 1998.

Stem cell treatments are a type of cell therapy that introduce new cells into adult bodies for possible treatment of cancer, somatic cell nuclear transfer, diabetes, and other medical conditions. Cloning also might be done with stem cells. Stem cells have been used to repair tissue damaged by disease.

Because ES cells are cultured from the embryoblast 4–5 days after fertilization, harvesting them is most often done from donated embryos from in vitro fertilization (IVF) clinics. In January 2007, researchers at Wake Forest University reported that "stem cells drawn from amniotic fluid donated by pregnant women hold much of the same promise as embryonic stem cells."

== Europe ==
The European Union has yet to issue consistent regulations with respect to stem cell research in member states. Whereas Germany, Austria, Italy, Finland, Portugal and the Netherlands prohibit or severely restrict the use of embryonic stem cells, Greece, Sweden, Spain and the United Kingdom have created the legal basis to support this research. Belgium bans reproductive cloning but allows therapeutic cloning of embryos. France prohibits reproductive cloning and embryo creation for research purposes, but enacted laws (with a sunset provision expiring in 2009) to allow scientists to conduct stem cell research on imported a large amount of embryos from in vitro fertilization treatments. Germany has restrictive policies for stem cell research, but a 2008 law authorizes "the use of imported stem cell lines produced before May 1, 2007." Italy has a 2004 law that forbids all sperm or egg donations and the freezing of embryos, but allows, in effect, using existing stem cell lines that have been imported. Sweden forbids reproductive cloning, but allows therapeutic cloning and authorized a stem cell bank.

According to modern stem cell researchers, Spain is one of the leaders in stem cell research and currently has one of the most progressive legislations worldwide with respect to human embryonic stem cell (hESC) research. The new Spanish law allows existing frozen embryos – of which there are estimated to be tens of thousands in Spain – to be kept for patient's future use, donated for another infertile couple, or used in research. In 2003, Spain's laws state that embryos left over from IVF and donated by the couple that created them can be used in research, including ES cell research, if they have been frozen for more than five years.

In 2001, the British Parliament amended the Human Fertilisation and Embryology Act 1990 (since amended by the Human Fertilisation and Embryology Act 2008) to permit the destruction of embryos for hESC harvests but only if the research satisfies one of the following requirements:

1. Increases knowledge about the development of embryos,
2. Increases knowledge about serious disease, or
3. Enables any such knowledge to be applied in developing treatments for serious disease.

The United Kingdom is one of the leaders in stem cell research, in the opinion of Lord Sainsbury, Science and Innovation Minister for the UK. A new £10 million stem cell research centre has been announced at the University of Cambridge.

== Africa ==
The primary legislation in South Africa that deals with embryo research is the Human Tissue Act, which is set to be replaced by Chapter 8 of the National Health Act. The NHA Chapter 8 has been enacted by parliament, but not yet signed into force by the president. The process of finalising these regulations is still underway. The NHA Chapter 8 allows the Minister of Health to give permission for research on embryos not older than 14 days. The legislation on embryo research is complemented by the South African Medical Research Council's Ethics Guidelines. These Guidelines advise against the creation of embryos for the sole purpose of research. In the case of Christian Lawyers Association of South Africa & others v Minister of Health & others the court ruled that the Bill of Rights is not applicable to the unborn. It has therefore been argued based on constitutional grounds (the right to human dignity, and the right to freedom of scientific research) that the above limitations on embryo research are overly inhibitive of the autonomy of scientists, and hence unconstitutional.

== Asia ==
China prohibits human reproductive cloning but allows the creation of human embryos for research and therapeutic purposes. India banned in 2004 reproductive cloning, permitted therapeutic cloning. In 2004, Japan’s Council for Science and Technology Policy voted to allow scientists to conduct stem cell research for therapeutic purposes, though formal guidelines have yet to be released. In December 2012, Japanese Prime Minister, Shinzō Abe, announced an investment into regenerative medicine of ¥110 billion (US$1 billion) over the next decade. The South Korean government promotes therapeutic cloning, but forbids cloning. The Philippines prohibits human embryonic and aborted human fetal stem cells and their derivatives for human treatment and research. In 1999, Israel passed legislation banning reproductive, but not therapeutic, cloning. Saudi Arabia religious officials issued a decree that sanctions the use of embryos for therapeutic and research purposes. According to the Royan Institute for Reproductive Biomedicine, Iran has some of the most liberal laws on stem cell research and cloning. Laws and regulations in Jordan allow stem-cell research. A center for stem cell research has acquired a license to begin operating in April 2017 at the University of Jordan.

== Americas ==
=== Brazil ===
Brazil has passed legislation to permit stem cell research using excess in vitro fertilized embryos that have been frozen for at least three years.

=== United States ===
Federal law places restrictions on funding and use of hES cells through amendments to the budget bill. In 2001, George W. Bush implemented a policy limiting the number of stem cell lines that could be used for research. There were some state laws concerning stem cells that were passed in the mid-2000s. New Jersey's 2004 S1909/A2840 specifically permitted human cloning for the purpose of developing and harvesting human stem cells, and Missouri's 2006 Amendment Two legalized certain forms of embryonic stem cell research in the state. On the other hand, Arkansas, Indiana, Louisiana, Michigan, North Dakota and South Dakota passed laws to prohibit the creation or destruction of human embryos for medical research.

During Bush's second term, in July 2006, he used his first Presidential veto on the Stem Cell Research Enhancement Act. The Stem Cell Research Enhancement Act was the name of two similar bills, and both were vetoed by President George W. Bush and were not enacted into law. New Jersey congressman Chris Smith, a prominent "Pro-Life" politician, wrote the Stem Cell Therapeutic and Research Act of 2005, which made some narrow exceptions, and was signed into law by President Bush.

In November 2004, California voters approved Proposition 71, creating a US$3 billion state taxpayer-funded institute for stem cell research, the California Institute for Regenerative Medicine. It hopes to provide $300 million a year.

In 2014, United States v. Regenerative Sciences, LLC upheld FDA's regulation of stem cell therapies.

Barack Obama removed the restriction of federal funding signed by Bush in 2001, which only allowed funding on the 21 cell lines already created. However, the Dickey Amendment to the budget, The Omnibus Appropriations Act of 2009, still bans federal funding of creating new cell lines. In other words, the federal government will now fund research which uses the hundreds of more lines created by public and private funds.

=== Canada ===
In March 2002, the Canadian Institutes of Health Research announced the first ever guidelines for human pluripotent stem cell research in Canada. The federal granting agencies, CIHR, Natural Sciences and Engineering Research Council, and Social Sciences and Humanities Research Council of Canada teamed up and agreed that no research with human IPSCs would be funded without review and approval from the Stem Cell Oversight Committee (SCOC).

In March 2004, Canadian parliament enacted the Assisted Human Reproduction Act (AHRA), modeled on the United Kingdom’s Human Fertilization and Embryology Act of 1990. Highlights of the act include prohibitions against the creation of embryos for research purposes and the criminalization of commercial transactions in human reproductive tissues.

In 2005, Canada enacted a law permitting research on discarded embryos from in vitro fertilization procedures. However, it prohibits the creation of human embryos for research.

On June 30, 2010, The Updated Guidelines for Human Pluripotent Stem Cell Research outline that:

1. The embryos used must originally have been created for reproductive purposes
2. The persons for whom the embryos were created must provide free and informed consent for the unrestricted research use of any embryos created, which are no longer required for reproductive purposes
3. The ova, sperm, nor embryo must not have been obtained through commercial transactions

Canada's National Embryonic Stem Cell Registry:

- contains all human embryonic stem cell lines generated using CIHR funds or funds from any of the research councils
- is a prerequisite for obtaining CIHR funding for human embryonic stem cell research
- will minimize the need to generate large numbers of cell lines, and decrease the need for donation of large numbers of embryos

== Oceania ==
Australia is partially supportive (exempting reproductive cloning yet allowing research on embryonic stem cells that are derived from the process of IVF). New Zealand, however, restricts stem cell research.

== See also ==
- Christian views on cloning
- Dickey–Wicker Amendment
- National Center for Regenerative Medicine
