= Adult stem cell =

Multipotent stem cell in the adult body

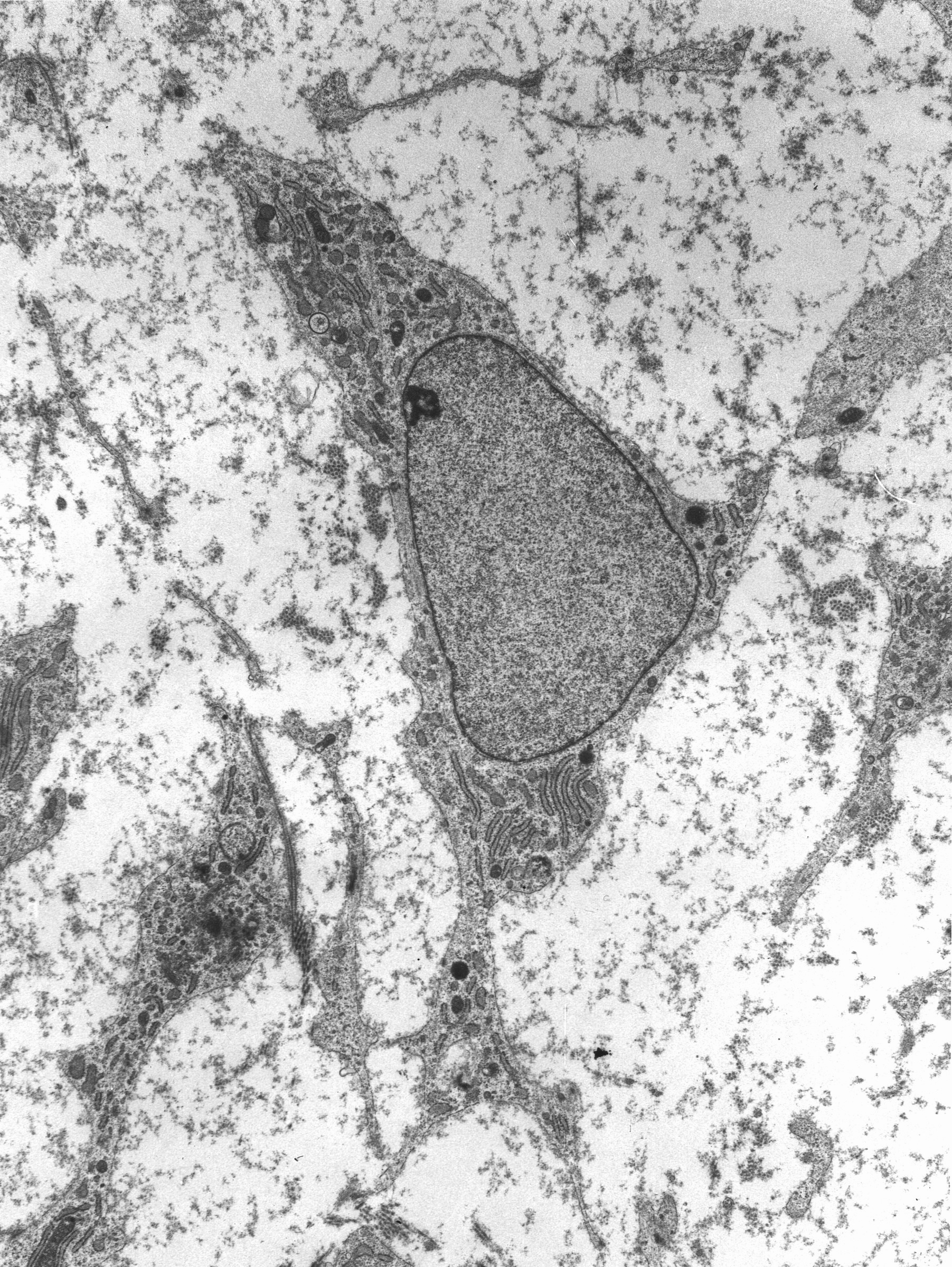
- Transmission electron micrograph of an adult stem cell displaying typical ultrastructural characteristics.

Details

Identifiers
- Latin: cellula praecursoria
- MeSH: D053687
- TH: H1.00.01.0.00035

Adult stem cells are undifferentiated cells, found throughout the body after development, that multiply by cell division to replenish dying cells and regenerate damaged tissues. They are also known as somatic stem cells (from Greek σωματικóς, meaning of the body). Unlike embryonic stem cells, they can be found in juvenile and adult animals, including humans.

Scientific interest in adult stem cells is centered around two main characteristics. The first of which is their ability to divide or self-renew indefinitely, and the second their ability to generate all the cell types of the organ from which they originate, potentially regenerating the entire organ from a few cells. Unlike embryonic stem cells, the use of human adult stem cells in research and therapy is not considered to be controversial, as they are derived from adult tissue samples rather than human embryos designated for scientific research.

The main functions of adult stem cells are to replace cells that are at risk of possibly dying as a result of disease or injury and to maintain a state of homeostasis within the cell. There are three main methods to determine if the adult stem cell is capable of becoming a specialized cell. The adult stem cell can be labeled in vivo and tracked, it can be isolated and then transplanted back into the organism, and it can be isolated in vivo and manipulated with growth hormones. They have mainly been studied in humans and model organisms, such as mice, rats and planarians.

Stem cell division and differentiation: A – stem cells; B – progenitor cell; C – differentiated cell; 1 – symmetric stem cell division; 2 – asymmetric stem cell division; 3 – progenitor division; 4 – terminal differentiation

== Structure ==
=== Defining properties ===
A stem cell possesses two properties:

- Self-renewal is the ability to go through numerous cycles of cell division while still maintaining its undifferentiated state. Stem cells can replicate several times and can result in the formation of two stem cells, one stem cell more differentiated than the other, or two differentiated cells.
- Multipotency or multidifferentiative potential is the ability to generate progeny of several distinct cell types, (for example glial cells and neurons) as opposed to unipotency, which is the term for cells that are restricted to producing a single cell type. However, some researchers do not consider multipotency to be essential and believe that unipotent self-renewing stem cells can exist. These properties can be illustrated with relative ease in vitro, using methods such as clonogenic assays, where the progeny of a single cell is characterized. However, it is known that in vitro cell culture conditions can alter the behavior of cells, proving that a particular subpopulation of cells possesses stem cell properties in vivo is challenging, and so considerable debate exists as to whether some proposed stem cell populations in the adult are indeed stem cells.

== Properties ==
=== Cell division ===
To ensure self-renewal, stem cells undergo two types of cell division (see Stem cell division and differentiation diagram). Symmetric division gives rise to two identical daughter stem cells, whereas asymmetric division produces one stem cell and one progenitor cell with limited self-renewal potential. Progenitors can go through several rounds of cell division before finally differentiating into a mature cell. It is believed that the molecular distinction between symmetric and asymmetric divisions lies in the differential segregation of cell membrane proteins (such as receptors) and their associated proteins between the daughter cells.

Under normal conditions, tissue stem cells divide slowly and infrequently. They exhibit signs of quiescence or reversible growth arrest. The niche the stem cell is found in plays a large role in maintaining quiescence. Perturbed niches cause the stem cell to begin actively dividing again to replace lost or damaged cells until the niche is restored. In hematopoietic stem cells, the MAPK/ERK pathway and PI3K/AKT/mTOR pathway regulate this transition. The ability to regulate the cell cycle in response to external cues helps prevent stem cell exhaustion or the gradual loss of stem cells following an altered balance between dormant and active states. Infrequent cell divisions also help reduce the risk of acquiring DNA mutations that would be passed on to daughter cells.

=== Plasticity ===
Discoveries in recent years have suggested that adult stem cells might have the ability to differentiate into cell types from different germ layers. For instance, neural stem cells from the brain, which are derived from ectoderm, can differentiate into ectoderm, mesoderm, and endoderm. Stem cells from the bone marrow, which is derived from mesoderm, can differentiate into liver, lung, GI tract, and skin, which are derived from endoderm and mesoderm. This phenomenon is referred to as stem cell transdifferentiation or plasticity. It can be induced by modifying the growth medium when stem cells are cultured in vitro or by transplanting them to an organ of the body different from the one they were originally isolated from.

There is yet no consensus among biologists on the prevalence and physiological and therapeutic relevance of stem cell plasticity. More recent findings suggest that pluripotent stem cells may reside in blood and adult tissues in a dormant state. These cells are referred to as "Blastomere Like Stem Cells" (BLSCs) and "very small embryonic-like" (VSEL) stem cells, and display pluripotency in vitro.

As BLSCs and VSEL cells are present in virtually all adult tissues, including the lungs, brain, kidneys, muscles, and pancreas, co-purification of BLSCs and VSEL cells with other populations of adult stem cells may explain the apparent pluripotency of adult stem cell populations. However, recent studies have shown that both human and murine VSEL cells lack stem cell characteristics and are not pluripotent.

=== Aging ===
Stem cell function becomes impaired with age, and this contributes to progressive deterioration of tissue maintenance and repair. A likely important cause of increasing stem cell dysfunction is an age-dependent accumulation of DNA damage in both stem cells and the cells that comprise the stem cell environment. (See also DNA damage theory of aging.)

Adult stem cells can, however, be artificially reverted to a state where they behave like embryonic stem cells (including the associated DNA repair mechanisms). This was done with mice as early as 2006 with prospects to slow down human aging substantially. Such cells are one of the various classes of induced stem cells.

== Function ==
=== Signaling pathways ===
Adult stem cell research has been focused on uncovering the general molecular mechanisms that control their self-renewal and differentiation.

- Notch

The Notch pathway has been known to developmental biologists for decades. Its role in the control of stem cell proliferation has now been demonstrated for several cell types including hematopoietic, neural, and mammary stem cells.

- Wnt

These developmental pathways are also strongly implicated as stem cell regulators.

- TGFβ

The TGFβ family of cytokines regulate the stemness of both normal and cancer stem cells.

== Types ==
=== Hematopoietic stem cells ===
Hematopoietic stem cells (HSCs) are stem cells that can differentiate into all blood cells. This process is called hematopoiesis. Hematopoietic stem cells are found in the bone marrow and umbilical cord blood. The HSCs are generally dormant when found in adults due to their nature.

=== Mammary stem cells ===
Mammary stem cells provide the source of cells for the growth of the mammary gland during puberty and gestation and play an important role in the carcinogenesis of the breast. Mammary stem cells have been isolated from human and mouse tissue as well as from cell lines derived from the mammary gland. Single such cells can give rise to both the luminal and myoepithelial cell types of the gland and have been shown to have the ability to regenerate the entire organ in mice.

=== Intestinal stem cells ===
Intestinal stem cells divide continuously throughout life and use a complex genetic program to produce the cells lining the surface of the small and large intestines. Intestinal stem cells reside near the base of the stem cell niche, called the crypts of Lieberkuhn. Intestinal stem cells are probably the source of most cancers of the small intestine and colon.

=== Mesenchymal stem cells ===
Mesenchymal stem cells (MSCs) are of stromal origin and may differentiate into a variety of tissues. MSCs have been isolated from the placenta, adipose tissue, lung, bone marrow and blood, Wharton's jelly from the umbilical cord, and teeth (perivascular niche of dental pulp and periodontal ligament). MSCs are attractive for clinical therapy due to their ability to differentiate, provide trophic support, and modulate innate immune response. These cells differentiate into various cell types such as osteoblasts, chondroblasts, adipocytes, neuroectodermal cells, and hepatocytes.

Bioactive mediators that favor local cell growth are also secreted by MSCs. Anti-inflammatory effects on the local microenvironment, which promote tissue healing, are also observed. The inflammatory response can be modulated by adipose-derived regenerative cells (ADRC) including mesenchymal stem cells and regulatory T-lymphocytes. The mesenchymal stem cells thus alter the outcome of the immune response by changing the cytokine secretion of dendritic and T-cell subsets. This results in a shift from a pro-inflammatory environment to an anti-inflammatory or tolerant cell environment.

=== Endothelial stem cells ===
Endothelial stem cells are one of the three types of multipotent stem cells found in the bone marrow. They are a rare and controversial group with the ability to differentiate into endothelial cells, the cells that line blood vessels as well as lymphatic vessels. Endothelial stem cells are an important aspect of the vascular network, even influencing the motion relating to white blood cells.

=== Neural stem cells ===
The existence of stem cells in the adult brain has been postulated following the discovery that the process of neurogenesis, the birth of new neurons, continues into adulthood in rats. The presence of stem cells in the mature primate brain was first reported in 1967. It has since been shown that new neurons are generated in adult mice, songbirds, and primates, including humans. Normally, adult neurogenesis is restricted to two areas of the brain – the subventricular zone, which lines the lateral ventricles, and the dentate gyrus of the hippocampal formation. Although the generation of new neurons in the hippocampus is well established, the presence of true self-renewing stem cells there has been debated. Under certain circumstances, such as following tissue damage in ischemia, neurogenesis can be induced in other brain regions, including the neocortex.

Neural stem cells are commonly cultured in vitro as so-called neurospheres – floating heterogeneous aggregates of cells, containing a large proportion of stem cells. They can be propagated for extended periods and differentiated into both neuronal and glial cells, and therefore behave as stem cells. However, some recent studies suggest that this behavior is induced by the culture conditions in progenitor cells, the progeny of stem cell division that normally undergo a strictly limited number of replication cycles in vivo. Furthermore, neurosphere-derived cells do not behave as stem cells when transplanted back into the brain.

Neural stem cells share many properties with hematopoietic stem cells (HSCs). Remarkably, when injected into the blood, neurosphere-derived cells differentiate into various cell types of the immune system.

=== Olfactory adult stem cells ===
Olfactory adult stem cells have been successfully harvested from the human olfactory mucosa cells, which are found in the lining of the nose and are involved in the sense of smell. If they are given the right chemical environment, these cells have the same ability as embryonic stem cells to develop into many different cell types. Olfactory stem cells hold the potential for therapeutic applications and, in contrast to neural stem cells, can be harvested with ease without harm to the patient. This means they can be easily obtained from all individuals, including older patients who might be most in need of stem cell therapies.

=== Neural crest stem cells ===
Hair follicles contain two types of stem cells, one of which appears to represent a remnant of the stem cells of the embryonic neural crest. Similar cells have been found in the gastrointestinal tract, sciatic nerve, cardiac outflow tract and spinal and sympathetic ganglia. These cells can generate neurons, Schwann cells, myofibroblasts, chondrocytes, and melanocytes.

=== Testicular cells ===
Multipotent stem cells with a claimed equivalency to embryonic stem cells have been derived from spermatogonial progenitor cells found in the testicles of laboratory mice by scientists in Germany and the United States, and, a year later, researchers from Germany and the United Kingdom confirmed the same capability using cells from the testicles of humans. The extracted stem cells are known as human adult germline stem cells (GSCs)

Multipotent stem cells have also been derived from germ cells found in human testicles.

== Clinical significance ==
Adult stem cell treatments have been used for many years to successfully treat leukemia and related bone/blood cancers utilizing bone marrow transplants. The use of adult stem cells in research and therapy is not considered as controversial as the use of embryonic stem cells, because the production of adult stem cells does not require the destruction of an embryo.

Early regenerative applications of adult stem cells have focused on intravenous delivery of blood progenitors known as Hematopoietic Stem Cells (HSCs). CD34+ hematopoietic Stem Cells have been clinically applied to treat various diseases including spinal cord injury, liver cirrhosis and Peripheral Vascular disease.

Research has shown that CD34+ hematopoietic Stem Cells are relatively more numerous in men than in women of reproductive age group among spinal cord Injury victims. Other early commercial applications have focused on Mesenchymal Stem Cells (MSCs). For both cell lines, direct injection or placement of cells into a site in need of repair may be the preferred method of treatment, as vascular delivery suffers from a "pulmonary first pass effect" where intravenously injected cells are sequestered in the lungs. Clinical case reports in orthopedic applications have been published. Wakitani has published a small case series of nine defects in five knees involving surgical transplantation of mesenchymal stem cells with coverage of the treated chondral defects.

Centeno et al. have reported high-field MRI evidence of increased cartilage and meniscus volume in individual human clinical subjects as well as a large n=227 safety study. Many other stem cell-based treatments are operating outside the US, with much controversy being reported regarding these treatments as some feel more regulation is needed as clinics tend to exaggerate claims of success and minimize or omit risks.

=== Therapies ===
The therapeutic potential of adult stem cells is the focus of much scientific research, due to their ability to be harvested from the parent body that is females during the delivery. In common with embryonic stem cells, adult stem cells can differentiate into more than one cell type, but unlike the former they are often restricted to certain types or "lineages". The ability of a differentiated stem cell of one lineage to produce cells of a different lineage is called transdifferentiation. Some types of adult stem cells are more capable of transdifferentiation than others, but for many there is no evidence that such a transformation is possible. Consequently, adult stem therapies require a stem cell source of the specific lineage needed, and harvesting and/or culturing them up to the numbers required is a challenge. Additionally, cues from the immediate environment (including how stiff or porous the surrounding structure/extracellular matrix is) can alter or enhance the fate and differentiation of the stem cells.

=== Sources ===
Pluripotent stem cells, i.e. cells that can give rise to any fetal or adult cell type, can be found in several tissues, including umbilical cord blood. Using genetic reprogramming, pluripotent stem cells equivalent to embryonic stem cells have been derived from human adult skin tissue. Other adult stem cells are multipotent, meaning there are several limited types of cell they can become, and are generally referred to by their tissue origin (such as mesenchymal stem cell, adipose-derived stem cell, endothelial stem cell, etc.). A great deal of adult stem cell research has focused on investigating their capacity to divide or self-renew indefinitely, and their differentiation potential. In mice, pluripotent stem cells can be directly generated from adult fibroblast cultures.

== Research ==
=== Cancer ===
In recent years, acceptance of the concept of adult stem cells has increased. There is now a hypothesis that stem cells reside in many adult tissues and that these unique reservoirs of cells not only are responsible for the normal reparative and regenerative processes but are also considered to be a prime target for genetic and epigenetic changes, culminating in many abnormal conditions including cancer. (See cancer stem cell for more details.)

=== Multidrug resistance ===
Adult stem cells express transporters of the ATP-binding cassette family that actively pump a diversity of organic molecules out of the cell. Many pharmaceuticals are exported by these transporters conferring multidrug resistance onto the cell. This complicates the design of drugs, for instance, neural stem cell-targeted therapies for the treatment of clinical depression.

=== Lung Organoid Model: Lung Disease in COVID-19 ===
The virus that causes COVID-19, SARS-CoV-2, damages the lungs extensively in the presence of an overreactive immune response. Adult stem cells were extracted from deep lung biopsies and used to construct a complete lung model with both proximal and distal airway epithelia. After being developed in 3D cultures, the organoids were separated into individual cells to form 2D monolayers. These lung models were used to study the damage SARS-CoV-2 causes when applied to the apical side of the transwell.

=== Stroke Treatment ===
Due to their multipotency, capacity to release growth factors, and immunomodulatory abilities, stem cell-based therapies have become a viable tool for the treatment of both acute and delayed phases of stroke. By inducing neurogenesis, angiogenesis, and synaptogenesis as well as activating endogenous restorative processes through the generation of cytokines and trophic factors, this transdifferentiation can form cells with a neural lineage.

== See also ==
- Induced somatic stem cells
