= Minimally manipulated cells =

Cell-based therapy

Minimally manipulated cells are non-cultured (non-expanded) cells isolated from the biological material by its grinding, homogenization or selective collection of cells, which undergo minimal manipulation. Minimally manipulated cells are usually using for the treatment of skin ulceration, alopecia, and arthritis. Minimally manipulated cells can be used for the intraoperative creation of tissue-engineered grafts in situ.

== International regulation ==
Minimally manipulated cells are allowed to be an object of manufacture and homologous transplantation in USA and European Countries. The criteria of "minimal manipulation" are variative in different countries. European regulations, according to the Reflection Paper on the classification of advanced therapy medicinal products of the European Medicines Agency, define "minimal manipulation" as the procedure that does not change biological characteristics and functions of cells. In particular, enzymatic digestion of biomaterial is prohibited, when cell-to-cell contacts are dissociated.

According to the US regulations (US 21 Code of Federal Regulations § 1271.3(f)(1), Section 361) human cells and tissues and tissue-based products (section 361 HCT/Ps), "minimal manipulation" is a processing that does not alter the original relevant characteristics of the structural tissue relating to the tissue's utility for reconstruction, repair, or replacement.

Russian regulations provide no specific definition for "minimally manipulated" cells. However, it follows from the content of the Order of Russian Ministry of Health No. 1158n "On amending the list of transplantation objects". According to the Order, cells obtained from the biomaterial by its grinding, homogenization, enzymatic treatment, removal of unwanted components or by selective collection of cells, could be considered as "minimally manipulated". Minimally manipulated cells are allowed to be an object of transplantation, when they do not contain any other substances except for water, crystalloids, sterilizing, storage, and (or) specific preserving agents.

== See also ==
- Advanced Therapy Medicinal Product
