= Dickey–Wicker Amendment =

American law bill rider

The Dickey–Wicker Amendment is the name of an appropriation bill rider attached to a bill passed by United States Congress in 1995, and signed by former President Bill Clinton, which prohibits the United States Department of Health and Human Services (HHS) from using appropriated funds for the creation of human embryos for research purposes or for research in which human embryos are destroyed. HHS funding includes the funding for the National Institutes of Health (NIH). It is named after Jay Dickey and Roger Wicker, two Republican Representatives. Technically, the Dickey Amendment is a rider to other legislation, which amends the original legislation. The rider receives its name from the name of the Congressman that originally introduced the amendment, Representative Dickey. The Dickey amendment language has been added to each of the Labor, HHS, and Education appropriations acts for fiscal years 1997 through 2009. The original rider can be found in Section 128 of P.L. 104–99.

The wording of the rider is generally the same year after year. For fiscal year 2009, the wording in Division F, Section 509 of the Omnibus Appropriations Act, 2009, (enacted March 11, 2009) prohibits HHS, including NIH, from using fiscal year 2009 appropriated funds as follows:

SEC. 509. (a) None of the funds made available in this Act may be used for--

(1) the creation of a human embryo or embryos for research purposes; or
(2) research in which a human embryo or embryos are destroyed, discarded, or knowingly subjected to risk of injury or death greater than that allowed for research on fetuses in utero under 45 CFR 46.208(a)(2) and Section 498(b) of the Public Health Service Act (42 U.S.C. 289g(b)) (Title 42, Section 289g(b), United States Code).

(b) For purposes of this section, the term "human embryo or embryos" includes any organism, not protected as a human subject under 45 CFR 46 (the Human Subject Protection regulations) ... that is derived by fertilization, parthenogenesis, cloning, or any other means from one or more human gametes (sperm or egg) or human diploid cells (cells that have two sets of chromosomes, such as somatic cells).

In March 2009, President Obama issued an executive order which removed the restriction against federal funding of stem cell research. However, the Dickey–Wicker Amendment remains an obstacle for federally funded researchers seeking to create their own stem cell lines. In August 2010, as part of preliminary motions in Sherley vs Sebelius, Judge Royce C. Lamberth granted an injunction against federally funded embryonic stem cell (ESC) research on the grounds that the guidelines for ESC research "clearly violate" the Dickey–Wicker Amendment. In September 2010, he refused to lift the injunction pending the conclusion of the case and the issuance of his ruling and a likely appeal. In response, the Obama Justice Department asked the U.S. Court of Appeals for the District of Columbia Circuit to lift the injunction via an order pending the appeal of Judge Lamberth's ruling, which it did on April 29, 2011. Judge Lamberth was thereby obliged to reverse his ruling, and grudgingly dismissed the case entirely on July 27, 2011.

In the 2–1 opinion of April 29, 2011, the appeals panel said that the Dickey–Wicker Amendment was "ambiguous" and that the National Institutes of Health had "reasonably concluded" that although federal funds could not be used to directly destroy an embryo, the amendment does not prohibit funding a research project using embryonic stem cells. This is an important distinction under the law, because for federal funds to be used directly to support the destruction of embryos—as opposed to indirect use just in embryo stem cell research that avoids killing the embryo—is supposedly a violation of the Hyde Amendment, which has been ruled constitutional and which prohibits abortions using federal tax dollar funds (those questions will now have to be settled by the whole Court of Appeals for the District of Columbia Circuit sitting en banc, or perhaps, ultimately, by the Supreme Court of the United States).

== History of US concerns about embryos ==
Federal concern with human embryo research began over 25 years ago with the advent of assisted reproduction technologies, i.e. in vitro fertilization (IVF) or "test tube babies."

Although the first report of laboratory studies of human fertilization appeared in Science in 1944, (the work was conducted in Brookline, Massachusetts), clinical IVF was successful first in Great Britain in 1978 for couples with infertility. IVF became standard of care in the United States in the early 1980s. As with all forms of clinical treatment, the medical community looked to basic science research to improve the safety and efficacy of IVF for mothers and babies.

In 1979, an Ethics Advisory Board for the National Institutes of Health issued guidelines for research on early human embryos, but no action was taken. The Federal Policy for the Protection of Human Subjects (see: Human subject research legislation in the United States) enacted in 1977 remained in place: 45CFR § 46.204(d), "No application or proposal involving human in vitro fertilization may be funded by the Department or any component thereof until the application or proposal has been reviewed by the Ethical Advisory Board and the Board has rendered advice as to its acceptability from an ethical standpoint." Since there was no Ethics Advisory Board, federally funded research was not possible.

== See also ==
- Stem cell controversy
- Stem cell laws
