= Stem Cell Research Enhancement Act =

Stem Cell Research Enhancement Act was the name of two similar bills that both passed through the United States House of Representatives and Senate, but were both vetoed by President George W. Bush and were not enacted into law.

== Stem Cell Research Enhancement Act of 2005 ==
The Stem Cell Research Enhancement Act of 2005 (H.R. 810) was the first bill ever vetoed by United States President George W. Bush, more than five years after his inauguration. The bill, which passed both houses of Congress, but by less than the two-thirds majority needed to override the veto, would have allowed federal funding of stem cell research on new lines of stem cells derived from discarded human embryos created for fertility treatments.

The bill passed the House of Representatives by a vote of 238 to 194 on May 24, 2005., then passed the Senate by a vote of 63 to 37 on July 18, 2006. President Bush vetoed the bill on July 19, 2006. The House of Representatives then failed to override the veto (235 to 193) on July 19, 2006.

== Stem Cell Research Enhancement Act of 2007 ==
The Stem Cell Research Enhancement Act of 2007 (S. 5), was proposed federal legislation that would have amended the Public Health Service Act to provide for human embryonic stem cell research. It was similar in content to the vetoed Stem Cell Research Enhancement Act of 2005.

The bill passed the Senate on April 11, 2007, by a vote of 63–34, then passed the House on June 7, 2007, by a vote of 247–176. President Bush vetoed the bill on June 19, 2007, and an override was not attempted.

== Stem Cell Research Enhancement Act of 2009 ==
The bill was re-introduced in the 111th Congress. It was introduced in the House by Representative Diana DeGette (D-CO) on February 4, 2009. A Senate version was introduced by Tom Harkin (D-IA) on February 26, 2009. The House bill had 113 co-sponsors and the Senate 10 co-sponsors, as of November 20, 2009.

== Legislative history ==
Congress	Short title	Bill number(s)	Date introduced	Sponsor(s)	# of cosponsors	Latest status
109th Congress	Stem Cell Research Enhancement Act of 2005	H.R. 810	February 15, 2005	Rep. Michael Castle (R-DE)	200	Passed the House (238–194). Passed the Senate (63–37). Vetoed by President. Veto Override Failed in the House (235–193).
109th Congress	Stem Cell Research Enhancement Act of 2005	S. 471	February 28, 2005	Sen. Arlen Specter (R-PA)	43	Read twice and referred to the Senate Committee on Health, Education, Labor, and Pensions.
110th Congress	Stem Cell Research Enhancement Act of 2007	S. 5	January 4, 2007	Sen. Harry Reid (D-NV)	41	Passed the Senate (63–34). Passed the House (247–176). Vetoed by President.
110th Congress	Stem Cell Research Enhancement Act of 2007	H.R. 3	January 5, 2007	Rep. Diana DeGette (D-CO)	217	Passed the House (253–174)
111th Congress	Stem Cell Research Enhancement Act of 2009	H.R. 873	February 4, 2009	Rep. Diana DeGette (D-CO)	113	Referred to the House Committee on Energy and Commerce.
111th Congress	Stem Cell Research Enhancement Act of 2009	S. 487	February 26, 2009	Sen. Tom Harkin (D-IA)	10	Read twice and referred to the Senate Committee on Health, Education, Labor, and Pensions.

== See also ==
- Stem cell laws
