= Stem cell controversy =

Ethical concerns about embryonic stem cell research and medical use

The stem cell controversy concerns the ethics of research involving the development and use of human embryos. Most commonly, this controversy focuses on embryonic stem cells. Not all stem cell research involves human embryos. For example, adult stem cells, amniotic stem cells, and induced pluripotent stem cells do not involve creating, using, or destroying human embryos, and thus are minimally, if at all, controversial. Many less controversial sources of acquiring stem cells include using cells from the umbilical cord, breast milk, and bone marrow, which are not pluripotent.

== Background ==
For many decades, stem cells have played an important role in medical research, beginning in 1868 when Ernst Haeckel first used the phrase to describe the fertilized egg which eventually gestates into an organism. The term was later used in 1886 by William Sedgwick to describe the parts of a plant that grow and regenerate. Further work by Alexander Maximow and Leroy Stevens introduced the concept that stem cells are pluripotent. This significant discovery led to the first human bone marrow transplant by E. Donnall Thomas in 1956, which although successful in saving lives, has generated much controversy since. This has included the many complications inherent in stem cell transplantation (almost 200 allogeneic marrow transplants were performed in humans, with no long-term successes before the first successful treatment was made), through to more modern problems, such as how many cells are sufficient for engraftment of various types of hematopoietic stem cell transplants, whether older patients should undergo transplant therapy, and the role of irradiation-based therapies in preparation for transplantation.

The discovery of adult stem cells led scientists to develop an interest in the role of embryonic stem cells, and in separate studies in 1981 Gail Martin and Martin Evans derived pluripotent stem cells from the embryos of mice for the first time. This paved the way for Mario Capecchi, Martin Evans, and Oliver Smithies to create the first knockout mouse, allowing for a revival of research on human disease. In 1995 adult stem cell research with human use was patented (US PTO with effect from 1995). In fact, human use was published in World J Surg 1991 & 1999 (B G Matapurkar). Salhan, Sudha (August 2011).

In 1998, James Thomson and Jeffrey Jones derived the first human embryonic stem cells, which had potential for drug discovery and therapeutic transplantation. However, the use of the technique on human embryos led to more widespread controversy as criticism of the technique now began from the wider public who debated the moral ethics of questions concerning research involving human embryonic cells.

=== Potential use in therapy ===
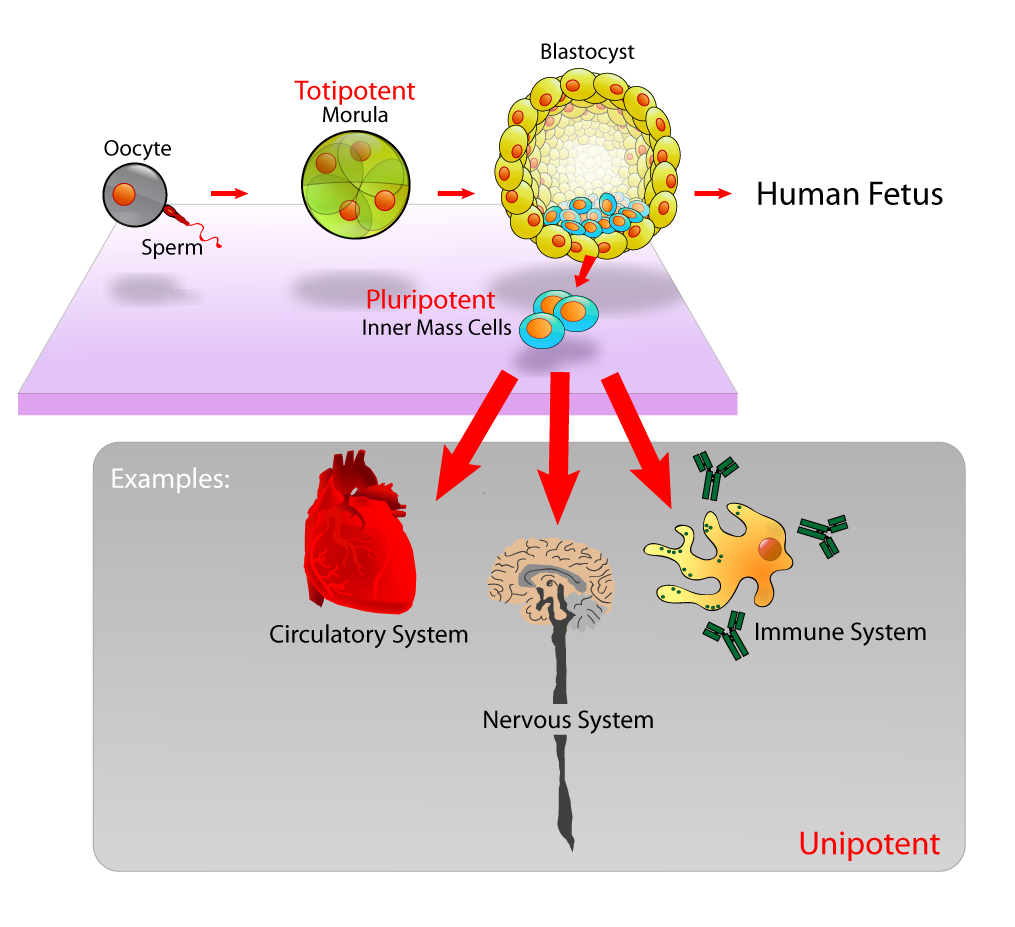
Since pluripotent stem cells have the ability to differentiate into any type of cell, they are used in the development of medical treatments for a wide range of conditions. Treatments that have been proposed include treatment for physical trauma, degenerative conditions, and genetic diseases (in combination with gene therapy). Yet further treatments using stem cells could potentially be developed due to their ability to repair extensive tissue damage. The source of pluripotent stems cells from developing embryos. Original work by Mike Jones for Wikipedia.This file is licensed under the Creative Commons Attribution-Share Alike 2.5 Generic license.

Great levels of success and potential have been realized from research using adult stem cells. In early 2009, the FDA approved the first human clinical trials using embryonic stem cells. Only cells from an embryo at the morula stage or earlier are truly totipotent, meaning that they are able to form all cell types including placental cells. Adult stem cells are generally limited to differentiating into different cell types of their tissue of origin. However, some evidence suggests that adult stem cell plasticity may exist, increasing the number of cell types a given adult stem cell can become.

=== Points of controversy ===
Destruction of a human embryo is required in order to research new embryonic cell lines. Much of the debate surrounding human embryonic stem cells, therefore, concern ethical and legal quandaries around the destruction of an embryo. Pew Research Center a nonpartisan, non-advocacy American association states stem cell research as, "Embryonic stem cell research, which uses special cells found in three to five-day-old human embryos to seek cures for a host of chronic diseases...In the 10 years since University of Wisconsin scientists announced they had harvested potentially life-saving cells from surplus embryos donated by fertility clinics." This sparked the ethical, medical and religious debate whether the embryonic "life" is worth exploiting which in the recent years has been a major political topic. Ethical and legal questions such as "At what point does one consider life to begin?" and "Is it just to destroy a human embryo if it has the potential to cure countless numbers of patients and further our understanding of disease?" are central to the controversy. Political leaders debate how to regulate and fund research studies that involve the techniques used to remove the embryo cells. No clear consensus has emerged.

Much of the criticism stems from religious moral code, and, in the most high-profile case, US President George W Bush signed an executive order banning the use of federal funding for any stem cell lines other than those already in existence, stating at the time, "My position on these issues is shaped by deeply held beliefs," and "I also believe human life is a sacred gift from our Creator." This ban was in part revoked by his successor Barack Obama, who stated: "As a person of faith, I believe we are called to care for each other and work to ease human suffering. I believe we have been given the capacity and will to pursue this research and the humanity and conscience to do so responsibly."

== Alternatives to embryonic stem cells ==
Some stem cell researchers are working to develop techniques of isolating stem cells with similar potency as embryonic stem cells, but do not require the destruction of a human embryo.

=== Induced pluripotent stem cells (iPSCs) ===
Foremost among these was the discovery in August 2006 that human adult somatic cells can be cultured in vitro with the four “Yamanaka factors” (Oct-4, SOX2, c-Myc, KLF4) which effectively returns a cell to the pluripotent state similar to that observed in embryonic stem cells. This major breakthrough won a Nobel Prize for the discoverers, Shinya Yamanaka and John Gurdon. Induced pluripotent stem cells are those derived from adult somatic cells and have the potential to provide an alternative for stem cell research that does not require the destruction of human embryos. Some debate remains about the similarities of these cells to embryonic stem cells as research has shown that the induced pluripotent cells may have a different epigenetic memory or modifications to the genome than embryonic stem cells depending on the tissue of origin and donor the iPSCs come from. While this may be the case, epigenetic manipulation of the cells is possible using small molecules and more importantly, iPSCs from multiple tissues of origin have been shown to give rise to a viable organism similar to the way ESCs can. This allows iPSCs to serve as a powerful tool for tissue generation, drug screening, disease modeling, and personalized medicine that has far fewer ethical considerations than embryonic stem cells that would otherwise serve the same purpose.

=== Somatic cell nuclear transfer (SCNT) ===
In an alternative technique, researchers at Harvard University, led by Kevin Eggan and Savitri Marajh, have transferred the nucleus of a somatic cell into an existing embryonic stem cell, thus creating a new stem cell line. This technique known as somatic cell nuclear transfer (SCNT) creates pluripotent cells that are genetically identical to the donor. While the creation of stem cells via SCNT does not destroy an embryo, it requires an oocyte from a donor which opens the door to a whole new set of ethical considerations such as the debate as to whether or not it is appropriate to offer financial incentives to female donors.

=== Single-Cell blastomere biopsy ===
Researchers at Advanced Cell Technology, led by Robert Lanza and Travis Wahl, reported the successful derivation of a stem cell line using a process similar to preimplantation genetic diagnosis, in which a single blastomere is extracted from a blastocyst. At the 2007 meeting of the International Society for Stem Cell Research (ISSCR), Lanza announced that his team had succeeded in producing three new stem cell lines without destroying the parent embryos."These are the first human embryonic cell lines in existence that didn't result from the destruction of an embryo." Lanza is currently in discussions with the National Institutes of Health to determine whether the new technique sidesteps U.S. restrictions on federal funding for ES cell research.

=== Amniotic fluid stem cells (AFSCs) ===
Anthony Atala of Wake Forest University says that the fluid surrounding the fetus has been found to contain stem cells that, when used correctly, "can be differentiated towards cell types such as fat, bone, muscle, blood vessel, nerve and liver cells." The extraction of this fluid is not thought to harm the fetus in any way. He hopes "that these cells will provide a valuable resource for tissue repair and for engineered organs, as well." AFSCs have been found to express both embryonic and adult stem cell markers as well as having the ability to be maintained over 250 population doublings.

=== Umbilical cord blood (UCB) ===
Similarly, pro-life supporters claim that the use of adult stem cells from sources such as the cord blood has consistently produced more promising results than the use of embryonic stem cells. Research has shown that umbilical cord blood (UCB) is in fact a viable source for stem cells and their progenitors which occur in high frequencies within the fluid. Furthermore, these cells may hold an advantage over induced PSC as they can create large quantities of homogenous cells.

IPSCs and other embryonic stem cell alternatives must still be collected and maintained with the informed consent of the donor as a donor's genetic information is still within the cells and by the definition of pluripotency, each alternative cell type has the potential to give rise to viable organisms. Generation of viable offspring using iPSCs has been shown in mouse models through tetraploid complementation. This potential for the generation of viable organisms and the fact that iPSC cells contain the DNA of donors require that they be handled along the ethical guidelines laid out by the US Food and Drug Administration (FDA), European Medicines Agency (EMA), and International Society for Stem Cell Research (ISSCR).

== Viewpoints ==
Stem cell debates have motivated and reinvigorated the anti-abortion movement, whose members are concerned with the rights and status of the human embryo as an early-aged human life. They believe that embryonic stem cell research profits from and violates the sanctity of life and is tantamount to murder. The fundamental assertion of those who oppose embryonic stem cell research is the belief that human life is inviolable, combined with the belief that human life begins when a sperm cell fertilizes an egg cell to form a single cell. The view of those in favor is that these embryos would otherwise be discarded, and if used as stem cells, they can survive as a part of a living human person.

A portion of stem cell researchers use embryos that were created but not used in in vitro fertility treatments to derive new stem cell lines. Most of these embryos are to be destroyed, or stored for long periods of time, long past their viable storage life. In the United States alone, an estimated at least 400,000 such embryos exist. This has led some opponents of abortion, such as Senator Orrin Hatch, to support human embryonic stem cell research. See also embryo donation.

Medical researchers widely report that stem cell research has the potential to dramatically alter approaches to understanding and treating diseases, and to alleviate suffering. In the future, most medical researchers anticipate being able to use technologies derived from stem cell research to treat a variety of diseases and impairments. Spinal cord injuries and Parkinson's disease are two examples that have been championed by high-profile media personalities (for instance, Christopher Reeve and Michael J. Fox, who have lived with these conditions, respectively). The anticipated medical benefits of stem cell research add urgency to the debates, which has been appealed to by proponents of embryonic stem cell research.

In August 2000, The U.S. National Institutes of Health's Guidelines stated:

... research involving human pluripotent stem cells ... promises new treatments and possible cures for many debilitating diseases and injuries, including Parkinson's disease, diabetes, heart disease, multiple sclerosis, burns and spinal cord injuries. The NIH believes the potential medical benefits of human pluripotent stem cell technology are compelling and worthy of pursuit in accordance with appropriate ethical standards.

In 2006, researchers at Advanced Cell Technology of Worcester, Massachusetts, succeeded in obtaining stem cells from mouse embryos without destroying the embryos. If this technique and its reliability are improved, it would alleviate some of the ethical concerns related to embryonic stem cell research.

Another technique announced in 2007 may also defuse the longstanding debate and controversy. Research teams in the United States and Japan have developed a simple and cost-effective method of reprogramming human skin cells to function much like embryonic stem cells by introducing artificial viruses. While extracting and cloning stem cells is complex and extremely expensive, the newly discovered method of reprogramming cells is much cheaper. However, the technique may disrupt the DNA in the new stem cells, resulting in damaged and cancerous tissue. More research will be required before noncancerous stem cells can be created.

Update of article to include 2009/2010 current stem cell usages in clinical trials: The planned treatment trials will focus on the effects of oral lithium on neurological function in people with chronic spinal cord injury and those who have received umbilical cord blood mononuclear cell transplants to the spinal cord. The interest in these two treatments derives from recent reports indicating that umbilical cord blood stem cells may be beneficial for spinal cord injury and that lithium may promote regeneration and recovery of function after spinal cord injury. Both lithium and umbilical cord blood are widely available therapies that have long been used to treat diseases in humans.

=== Endorsement ===
- Embryonic stem cells have the ability to grow indefinitely in a laboratory environment and can differentiate into almost all types of bodily tissue. This makes embryonic stem cells a prospect for cellular therapies to treat a wide range of diseases.

==== Human potential and humanity ====
This argument often goes hand-in-hand with the utilitarian argument, and can be presented in several forms:

- Embryos are not equivalent to human life while they are still incapable of surviving outside the womb (i.e. they only have the potential for life).
- More than a third of zygotes do not implant after conception. Thus, far more embryos are lost due to chance than are proposed to be used for embryonic stem cell research or treatments.
- Blastocysts are a cluster of human cells that have not differentiated into distinct organ tissue, making cells of the inner cell mass no more "human" than a skin cell.
- Some parties contend that embryos are not human persons, believing that the life of Homo sapiens only begins when the heartbeat develops, which is during the fifth week of pregnancy, or when the brain begins developing activity, which has been detected at 54 days after conception.

==== Efficiency ====
- In vitro fertilization (IVF) generates large numbers of unused embryos (e.g. 70,000 in Australia alone). Many of these thousands of IVF embryos are slated for destruction. Using them for scientific research uses a resource that would otherwise be wasted.
- While the destruction of human embryos is required to establish a stem cell line, no new embryos have to be destroyed to work with existing stem cell lines. It would be wasteful not to continue to make use of these cell lines as a resource.

==== Superiority ====
This is usually presented as a counter-argument to using adult stem cells, as an alternative that does not involve embryonic destruction.

- Embryonic stem cells make up a significant proportion of a developing embryo, while adult stem cells exist as minor populations within a mature individual (e.g. in every 1,000 cells of the bone marrow, only one will be a usable stem cell). Thus, embryonic stem cells are likely to be easier to isolate and grow ex vivo than adult stem cells.
- Embryonic stem cells divide more rapidly than adult stem cells, potentially making it easier to generate large numbers of cells for therapeutic means. In contrast, adult stem cell might not divide fast enough to offer immediate treatment.
- Embryonic stem cells have greater plasticity, potentially allowing them to treat a wider range of diseases.
- Adult stem cells from the patient's own body might not be effective in treatment of genetic disorders. Allogeneic embryonic stem cell transplantation (i.e. from a healthy donor) may be more practical in these cases than gene therapy of a patient's own cell.
- DNA abnormalities found in adult stem cells that are caused by toxins and sunlight may make them poorly suited for treatment.
- Embryonic stem cells have been shown to be effective in treating heart damage in mice.
- Embryonic stem cells have the potential to cure chronic and degenerative diseases which current medicine has been unable to effectively treat.

==== Individuality ====
- Before the primitive streak is formed when the embryo attaches to the uterus around 14 days after fertilization, two fertilized eggs can combine by fusing together and develop into one person (a tetragametic chimera). Since a fertilized egg has the potential to be two individuals or half of one, some believe it can only be considered a 'potential' person, not an actual one. Those who subscribe to this belief then hold that destroying a blastocyst for embryonic stem cells is ethical.

==== Viability ====
- Viability is another standard under which embryos and fetuses have been regarded as human lives. In the United States, the 1973 Supreme Court case of Roe v. Wade concluded that viability determined the permissibility of abortions performed for reasons other than the protection of the woman's health, defining viability as the point at which a fetus is "potentially able to live outside the mother's womb, albeit with artificial aid." The point of viability was 24 to 28 weeks when the case was decided and has since moved to about 22 weeks due to advancement in medical technology. Embryos used in medical research for stem cells are well below development that would enable viability.

==== Further uses for stem cells ====
Adult stem cells have provided many different therapies for illnesses such as Parkinson's disease, leukemia, multiple sclerosis, lupus, sickle-cell anemia, and heart damage (to date, embryonic stem cells have also been used in treatment). Moreover, there have been many advances in adult stem cell research, including a recent study where pluripotent adult stem cells were manufactured from differentiated fibroblast by the addition of specific transcription factors. Newly created stem cells were developed into an embryo and were integrated into newborn mouse tissues, analogous to the properties of embryonic stem cells.

== Stated views of groups ==
=== Government policy stances ===
==== Europe ====
Austria, Denmark, France, Germany, Portugal and Ireland do not allow the production of embryonic stem cell lines, but the creation of embryonic stem cell lines is permitted in Finland, Greece, the Netherlands, Sweden, and the United Kingdom.

==== United States ====
===== Origins =====
In 1973, Roe v. Wade legalized abortion in the United States. Five years later, the first successful human in vitro fertilization resulted in the birth of Louise Brown in England. These developments prompted the federal government to create regulations barring the use of federal funds for research that experimented on human embryos. In 1995, the NIH Human Embryo Research Panel advised the administration of President Bill Clinton to permit federal funding for research on embryos left over from in vitro fertility treatments and also recommended federal funding of research on embryos specifically created for experimentation. In response to the panel's recommendations, the Clinton administration, citing moral and ethical concerns, declined to fund research on embryos created solely for research purposes, but did agree to fund research on leftover embryos created by in vitro fertility treatments. At this point, the Congress intervened and passed the 1995 Dickey–Wicker Amendment (the final bill, which included the Dickey-Wicker Amendment, was signed into law by Bill Clinton) which prohibited any federal funding for the Department of Health and Human Services be used for research that resulted in the destruction of an embryo regardless of the source of that embryo.

In 1998, privately funded research led to the breakthrough discovery of human embryonic stem cells (hESC). This prompted the Clinton administration to re-examine guidelines for federal funding of embryonic research. In 1999, the president's National Bioethics Advisory Commission recommended that hESC harvested from embryos discarded after in vitro fertility treatments, but not from embryos created expressly for experimentation, be eligible for federal funding. Though embryo destruction had been inevitable in the process of harvesting hESC in the past (this is no longer the case), the Clinton administration had decided that it would be permissible under the Dickey-Wicker Amendment to fund hESC research as long as such research did not itself directly cause the destruction of an embryo. Therefore, HHS issued its proposed regulation concerning hESC funding in 2001. Enactment of the new guidelines was delayed by the incoming George W. Bush administration which decided to reconsider the issue.

President Bush announced, on August 9, 2001, that federal funds, for the first time, would be made available for hESC research on currently existing embryonic stem cell lines. President Bush authorized research on existing human embryonic stem cell lines, not on human embryos under a specific, unrealistic timeline in which the stem cell lines must have been developed. However, the Bush administration chose not to permit taxpayer funding for research on hESC cell lines not currently in existence, thus limiting federal funding to research in which "the life-and-death decision has already been made." The Bush administration's guidelines differ from the Clinton administration guidelines which did not distinguish between currently existing and not-yet-existing hESC. Both the Bush and Clinton guidelines agree that the federal government should not fund hESC research that directly destroys embryos.

Neither Congress nor any administration has ever prohibited private funding of embryonic research. Public and private funding of research on adult and cord blood stem cells is unrestricted.

===== U.S. congressional response =====
In April 2004, 206 members of Congress signed a letter urging President Bush to expand federal funding of embryonic stem cell research beyond what Bush had already supported.

In May 2005, the House of Representatives voted 238–194 to loosen the limitations on federally funded embryonic stem-cell research – by allowing government-funded research on surplus frozen embryos from in vitro fertilization clinics to be used for stem cell research with the permission of donors – despite Bush's promise to veto the bill if passed. On July 29, 2005, Senate Majority Leader William H. Frist (R-TN) announced that he too favored loosening restrictions on federal funding of embryonic stem cell research. On July 18, 2006, the Senate passed three different bills concerning stem cell research. The Senate passed the first bill (the Stem Cell Research Enhancement Act) 63–37, which would have made it legal for the federal government to spend federal money on embryonic stem cell research that uses embryos left over from in vitro fertilization procedures. On July 19, 2006, President Bush vetoed this bill. The second bill makes it illegal to create, grow, and abort fetuses for research purposes. The third bill would encourage research that would isolate pluripotent, i.e., embryonic-like, stem cells without the destruction of human embryos.

In 2005 and 2007, Congressman Ron Paul introduced the Cures Can Be Found Act, with 10 cosponsors. With an income tax credit, the bill favors research upon non-embryonic stem cells obtained from placentas, umbilical cord blood, amniotic fluid, humans after birth, or unborn human offspring who died of natural causes; the bill was referred to committee. Paul argued that hESC research is outside of federal jurisdiction either to ban or to subsidize.

Bush vetoed another bill, the Stem Cell Research Enhancement Act of 2007, which would have amended the Public Health Service Act to provide for human embryonic stem cell research. The bill passed the Senate on April 11 by a vote of 63–34, then passed the House on June 7 by a vote of 247–176. President Bush vetoed the bill on July 19, 2007.

On March 9, 2009, President Obama removed the restriction on federal funding for newer stem cell lines. Two days after Obama removed the restriction, the president then signed the Omnibus Appropriations Act of 2009, which still contained the long-standing Dickey–Wicker Amendment which bans federal funding of "research in which a human embryo or embryos are destroyed, discarded, or knowingly subjected to risk of injury or death;" the congressional provision effectively prevents federal funding being used to create new stem cell lines by many of the known methods. So, while scientists might not be free to create new lines with federal funding, President Obama's policy allows the potential of applying for such funding into research involving the hundreds of existing stem cell lines as well as any further lines created using private funds or state-level funding. The ability to apply for federal funding for stem cell lines created in the private sector is a significant expansion of options over the limits imposed by President Bush, who restricted funding to the 21 viable stem cell lines that were created before he announced his decision in 2001. The ethical concerns raised during Clinton's time in office continue to restrict hESC research and dozens of stem cell lines have been excluded from funding, now by judgment of an administrative office rather than presidential or legislative discretion.

===== Funding =====
In 2005, the NIH funded $607 million worth of stem cell research, of which $39 million was specifically used for hESC. Sigrid Fry-Revere has argued that private organizations, not the federal government, should provide funding for stem-cell research, so that shifts in public opinion and government policy would not bring valuable scientific research to a grinding halt.

In 2005, the State of California took out $3 billion in bond loans to fund embryonic stem cell research in that state.

==== Asia ====
China has one of the most permissive human embryonic stem cell policies in the world. In the absence of a public controversy, human embryo stem cell research is supported by policies that allow the use of human embryos and therapeutic cloning.

=== Religious views ===
Generally speaking, no group advocates for unrestricted stem cell research, especially in the context of embryonic stem cell research.

==== Jewish view ====
According to Rabbi Levi Yitzchak Halperin of the Institute for Science and Jewish Law in Jerusalem, embryonic stem cell research is permitted so long as it has not been implanted in the womb. Not only is it permitted, but research is encouraged, rather than wasting it.

As long as it has not been implanted in the womb and it is still a frozen fertilized egg, it does not have the status of an embryo at all and there is no prohibition to destroy it...

However in order to remove all doubt [as to the permissibility of destroying it], it is preferable not to destroy the pre-embryo unless it will otherwise not be implanted in the woman who gave the eggs (either because there are many fertilized eggs, or because one of the parties refuses to go on with the procedure – the husband or wife – or for any other reason). Certainly it should not be implanted into another woman.... The best and worthiest solution is to use it for life-saving purposes, such as for the treatment of people that suffered trauma to their nervous system, etc.

— Rabbi Levi Yitzchak Halperin, Ma'aseh Choshev vol. 3, 2:6

Similarly, the sole Jewish majority state, Israel, permits research on embryonic stem cells.

==== Catholicism ====
The Catholic Church opposes human embryonic stem cell research calling it "an absolutely unacceptable act." The Church supports research that involves stem cells from adult tissues and the umbilical cord, as it "involves no harm to human beings at any state of development." This support has been expressed both politically and financially, with different Catholic groups either raising money indirectly, offering grants, or seeking to pass federal legislation, according to the United States Conference of Catholic Bishops. Specific examples include a grant from the Catholic Archiocese of Sydney which funded research demonstrating the capabilities of adult stem cells, and the U.S. Conference of Catholic Bishops working to pass federal legislation creating a nationwide public bank for umbilical cord blood stem cells.

==== Baptists ====
The Southern Baptist Convention opposes human embryonic stem cell research on the grounds that the "Bible teaches that human beings are made in the image and likeness of God (Gen. 1:27; 9:6) and protectable human life begins at fertilization." However, it supports adult stem cell research as it does "not require the destruction of embryos."

==== Methodism ====
The United Methodist Church opposes human embryonic stem cell research, saying, "a human embryo, even at its earliest stages, commands our reverence." However, it supports adult stem cell research, stating that there are "few moral questions" raised by this issue.

==== Pentecostalism ====
The Assemblies of God opposes human embryonic stem cell research, saying, it "perpetuates the evil of abortion and should be prohibited."

==== Islam ====
Islamic scholars generally favor the stance that scientific research and development of stem cells is allowed as long as it benefits society while causing the least amount of harm to the subjects. "Stem cell research is one of the most controversial topics of our time period and has raised many religious and ethical questions regarding the research being done. With there being no true guidelines set forth in the Qur'an against the study of biomedical testing, Muslims have adopted any new studies as long as the studies do not contradict another teaching in the Qur'an. One of the teachings of the Qur'an states that 'Whosoever saves the life of one, it shall be if he saves the life of humankind' (5:32), it is this teaching that makes stem cell research acceptable in the Muslim faith because of its promise of potential medical breakthrough." This statement does not, however, make a distinction between adult, embryonic, or stem-cells. In specific instances, different sources have issued fatwas, or nonbinding but authoritative legal opinions according to Islamic faith, ruling on conduct in stem cell research. The Fatwa of the Islamic Jurisprudence Council of the Islamic World League (December 2003) addressed permissible stem cell sources, as did the Fatwa Khamenei (2002) in Iran. Several different governments in predominantly Muslim countries have also supported stem cell research, notably Iran. but Saudi Arabia religious officials issued a decree that sanctions the use of embryos for therapeutic and research purposes.

==== The Church of Jesus Christ of Latter-day Saints ====
The First Presidency of the Church of Jesus Christ of Latter-day Saints "has not taken a position regarding the use of embryonic stem cells for research purposes. The absence of a position should not be interpreted as support for or opposition to any other statement made by Church members, whether they are for or against embryonic stem cell research.”

== See also ==
- Stem cell laws
- Dickey–Wicker Amendment
- Medical ethics
- Stem Cell Research Enhancement Act
- Stem cell research policy
- Fetal Dickey-Wickert
