= Stem cell =

Unspecialized biological cell that can become specialized

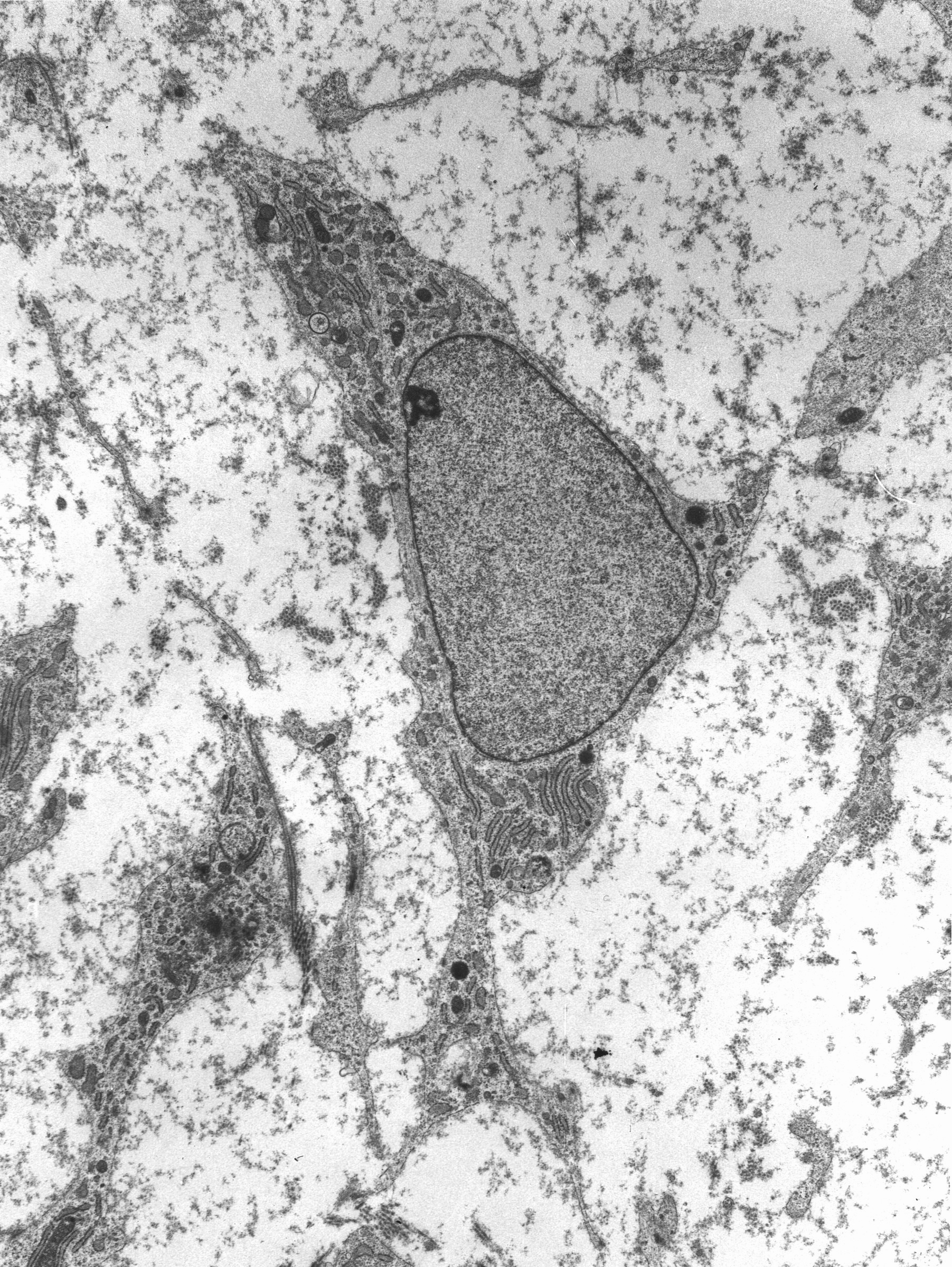
- Transmission electron micrograph of a mesenchymal stem cell displaying typical ultrastructural characteristics

Details

Identifiers
- Latin: cellula praecursoria
- MeSH: D013234
- TH: H1.00.01.0.00028, H2.00.01.0.00001
- FMA: 63368

In multicellular organisms, stem cells are undifferentiated or partially differentiated cells that can change into various types of cells and proliferate indefinitely to produce more of the same stem cell. They are the earliest type of cell in a cell lineage. They are found in both embryonic and adult organisms, but they have slightly different properties in each. They are usually distinguished from progenitor cells, which cannot divide indefinitely, and precursor or blast cells, which are usually committed to differentiating into one cell type.

In mammals, roughly 50 to 150 cells make up the inner cell mass during the blastocyst stage of embryonic development, around days 5–14. These have stem-cell capability. In vivo, they eventually differentiate into all of the body's cell types (making them pluripotent). This process starts with the differentiation into the three germ layers – the ectoderm, mesoderm and endoderm – at the gastrulation stage. However, when they are isolated and cultured in vitro, they can be kept in the stem-cell stage and are known as embryonic stem cells (ESCs).

Adult stem cells are found in a few select locations in the body, known as niches, such as those in the bone marrow or gonads. They are also found in menstrual blood. They exist to replenish rapidly lost cell types and are multipotent or unipotent, meaning they only differentiate into a few cell types or one type of cell. In mammals, they include, among others, hematopoietic stem cells, which replenish blood and immune cells, basal cells, which maintain the skin epithelium, and mesenchymal stem cells, which maintain bone, cartilage, muscle and fat cells. Adult stem cells are a small minority of cells; they are vastly outnumbered by the progenitor cells and terminally differentiated cells that they differentiate into.

Research into stem cells grew out of findings by Canadian biologists Ernest McCulloch, James Till and Andrew J. Becker at the University of Toronto and the Ontario Cancer Institute in the 1960s. As of 2016, the only established medical therapy using stem cells is hematopoietic stem cell transplantation, first performed in 1958 by French oncologist Georges Mathé. Since 1998 however, it has been possible to culture and differentiate human embryonic stem cells (in stem-cell lines). The process of isolating these cells has been controversial, because it typically results in the destruction of the embryo. Sources for isolating ESCs have been restricted in some European countries and Canada, but others such as the UK and China have promoted the research. Somatic cell nuclear transfer is a cloning method that can be used to create a cloned embryo for the use of its embryonic stem cells in stem cell therapy. In 2006, a Japanese team led by Shinya Yamanaka discovered a method to convert mature body cells back into stem cells. These were termed induced pluripotent stem cells (iPSCs).

== History ==
The term stem cell was coined by Theodor Boveri and Valentin Haecker in the late 19th century. Pioneering works in theory of blood stem cell were conducted at the beginning of the 20th century by Artur Pappenheim, Alexander A. Maximow, Franz Ernst Christian Neumann.

The key properties of a stem cell were first defined by Ernest McCulloch and James Till at the University of Toronto's Faculty of Medicine and the Ontario Cancer Institute in the early 1960s. They discovered the blood-forming stem cell, the hematopoietic stem cell (HSC), through their pioneering work in mice. McCulloch and Till began a series of experiments in which bone marrow cells were injected into irradiated mice. They observed lumps in the spleens of the mice that were linearly proportional to the number of bone marrow cells injected. They hypothesized that each lump (colony) was a clone arising from a single marrow cell (stem cell). In subsequent work, McCulloch and Till, joined by graduate student Andrew John Becker and senior scientist Louis Siminovitch, confirmed that each lump did in fact arise from a single cell. Their results were published in Nature in 1963. In that same year, Siminovitch was a lead investigator for studies that found colony-forming cells were capable of self-renewal, which is a key defining property of stem cells that Till and McCulloch had theorized.

The first therapy using stem cells was a bone marrow transplant performed by French oncologist Georges Mathé in 1956 on five workers at the Vinča Nuclear Institute in Yugoslavia who had been affected by a criticality accident. The workers all survived.

In 1981, embryonic stem (ES) cells were first isolated and successfully cultured using mouse blastocysts by British biologists Martin Evans and Matthew Kaufman. This allowed the formation of murine genetic models, a system in which the genes of mice are deleted or altered in order to study their function in pathology. In 1991, a process that allowed the human stem cell to be isolated was patented by Ann Tsukamoto. By 1998, human embryonic stem cells were first isolated by American biologist James Thomson, which made it possible to have new transplantation methods or various cell types for testing new treatments. In 2006, Shinya Yamanaka's team in Kyoto, Japan converted fibroblasts into pluripotent stem cells by modifying the expression of only four genes. The feat represents the origin of induced pluripotent stem cells, known as iPS cells.

In 2011, a female maned wolf, run over by a truck, underwent stem cell treatment at the Zoo Brasília, this being the first recorded case of the use of stem cells to heal injuries in a wild animal.

== Properties ==
The classical definition of a stem cell requires that it possesses two properties:

- Self-renewal: the ability to go through numerous cycles of cell growth and cell division, known as cell proliferation, while maintaining the undifferentiated state.
- Potency: the capacity to differentiate into specialized cell types. In the strictest sense, this requires stem cells to be either totipotent or pluripotent—to be able to give rise to any mature cell type, although multipotent or unipotent progenitor cells are sometimes referred to as stem cells. Apart from this, it is said that stem cell function is regulated in a feedback mechanism.

=== Self-renewal ===
Two mechanisms ensure that a stem cell population is maintained (does not shrink in size):

1. Asymmetric cell division: a stem cell divides into one mother cell, which is identical to the original stem cell, and another daughter cell, which is differentiated.

When a stem cell self-renews, it divides and disrupts the undifferentiated state. This self-renewal demands control of cell cycle as well as upkeep of multipotency or pluripotency, which all depends on the stem cell.

Stem cells use telomerase, a protein that restores telomeres, to protect their DNA and extend their cell division limit (the Hayflick limit).

=== Potency meaning ===
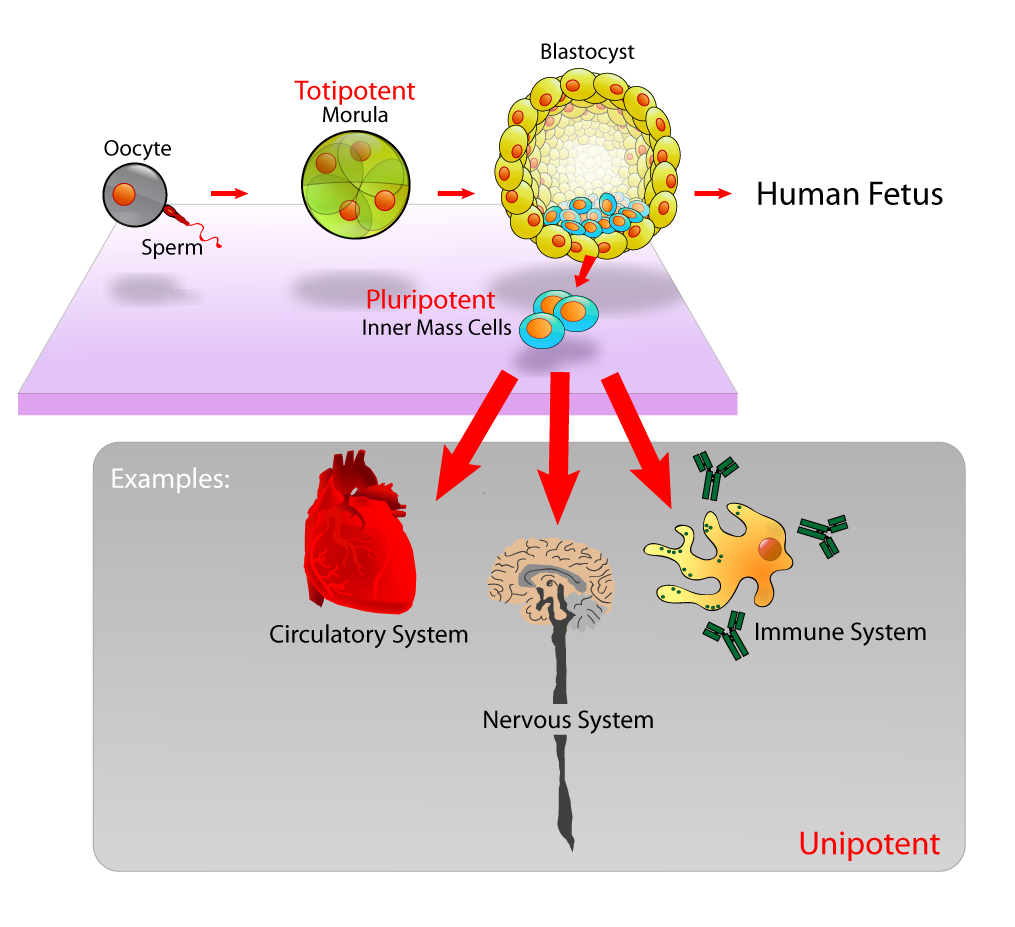
Pluripotent, embryonic stem cells originate as inner cell mass (ICM) cells within a blastocyst. These stem cells can become any tissue in the body, excluding a placenta. Only cells from an earlier stage of the embryo, known as the morula, are totipotent, able to become all tissues in the body and the extraembryonic placenta.

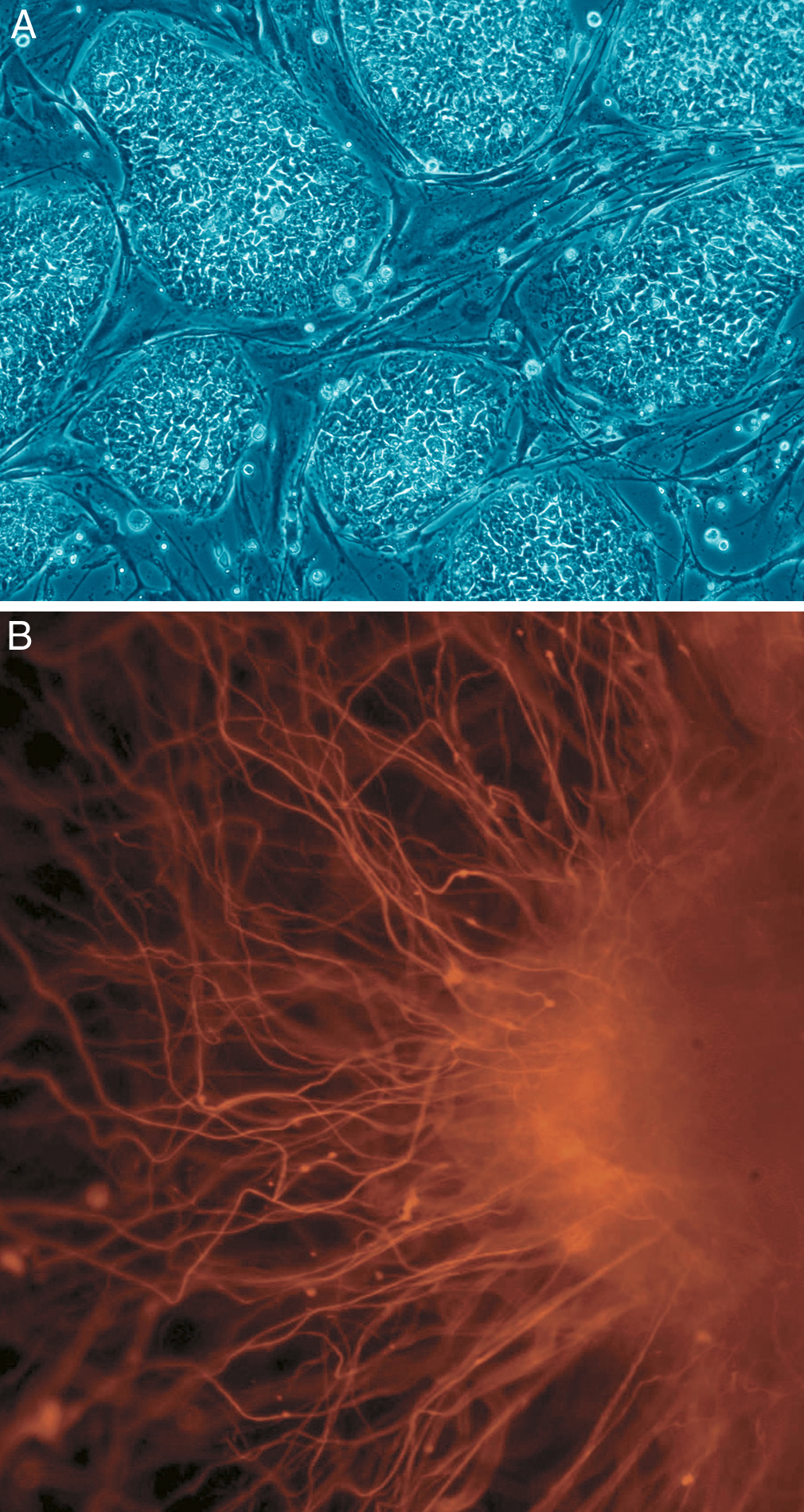
Human embryonic stem cells A: Stem cell colonies that are not yet differentiated. B: Nerve cells, an example of a cell type after differentiation.

Potency specifies the differentiation potential (the potential to differentiate into different cell types) of the stem cell.

- Totipotent (also known as omnipotent) stem cells can differentiate into embryonic and extraembryonic cell types. Such cells can construct a complete, viable organism. These cells are produced from the fusion of an egg and sperm cell. Cells produced by the first few divisions of the fertilized egg are also totipotent.
- Pluripotent stem cells are the descendants of totipotent cells and can differentiate into nearly all cells, i.e. cells derived from any of the three germ layers.
- Multipotent stem cells can differentiate into a number of cell types, but only those of a closely related family of cells.
- Oligopotent stem cells can differentiate into only a few cell types, such as lymphoid or myeloid stem cells.
- Unipotent cells can produce only one cell type, their own, but have the property of self-renewal, which distinguishes them from non-stem cells

=== Identification ===
In practice, stem cells are identified by whether they can regenerate tissue. For example, the defining test for bone marrow or hematopoietic stem cells (HSCs) is the ability to transplant the cells and save an individual without HSCs. This demonstrates that the cells can produce new blood cells over a long term. It should also be possible to isolate stem cells from the transplanted individual, which can themselves be transplanted into another individual without HSCs, demonstrating that the stem cell was able to self-renew.

Properties of stem cells can be illustrated in vitro, using methods such as clonogenic assays, in which single cells are assessed for their ability to differentiate and self-renew. Stem cells can also be isolated by their possession of a distinctive set of cell surface markers. However, in vitro culture conditions can alter the behavior of cells, making it unclear whether the cells shall behave in a similar manner in vivo. There is considerable debate as to whether some proposed adult cell populations are truly stem cells.

== Embryonic ==
Embryonic stem cells (ESCs) are the cells of the inner cell mass of a blastocyst, formed prior to implantation in the uterus. In human embryonic development the blastocyst stage is reached 4–5 days after fertilization, at which time it consists of 50–150 cells. ESCs are pluripotent and give rise during development to all derivatives of the three germ layers: ectoderm, endoderm and mesoderm. In other words, they can develop into each of the more than 200 cell types of the adult body when given sufficient and necessary stimulation for a specific cell type. They do not contribute to the extraembryonic membranes or to the placenta.

During embryonic development the cells of the inner cell mass continuously divide and become more specialized. For example, a portion of the ectoderm in the dorsal part of the embryo specializes as 'neurectoderm', which will become the future central nervous system (CNS). Later in development, neurulation causes the neurectoderm to form the neural tube. At the neural tube stage, the anterior portion undergoes encephalization to generate or 'pattern' the basic form of the brain. At this stage of development, the principal cell type of the CNS is considered a neural stem cell.

The neural stem cells self-renew and at some point transition into radial glial progenitor cells (RGPs). Early-formed RGPs self-renew by symmetrical division to form a reservoir group of progenitor cells. These cells transition to a neurogenic state and start to divide asymmetrically to produce a large diversity of many different neuron types, each with unique gene expression, morphological, and functional characteristics. The process of generating neurons from radial glial cells is called neurogenesis. The radial glial cell, has a distinctive bipolar morphology with highly elongated processes spanning the thickness of the neural tube wall. It shares some glial characteristics, most notably the expression of glial fibrillary acidic protein (GFAP). The radial glial cell is the primary neural stem cell of the developing vertebrate CNS, and its cell body resides in the ventricular zone, adjacent to the developing ventricular system. Neural stem cells are committed to the neuronal lineages (neurons, astrocytes, and oligodendrocytes), and thus their potency is restricted.

Nearly all research to date has made use of mouse embryonic stem cells (mES) or human embryonic stem cells (hES) derived from the early inner cell mass. Both have the essential stem cell characteristics, yet they require very different environments in order to maintain an undifferentiated state. Mouse ES cells are grown on a layer of gelatin as an extracellular matrix (for support) and require the presence of leukemia inhibitory factor (LIF) in serum media. A drug cocktail containing inhibitors to GSK3B and the MAPK/ERK pathway, called 2i, has also been shown to maintain pluripotency in stem cell culture. Human ESCs are grown on a feeder layer of mouse embryonic fibroblasts and require the presence of basic fibroblast growth factor (bFGF or FGF-2). Without optimal culture conditions or genetic manipulation, embryonic stem cells will rapidly differentiate.

A human embryonic stem cell is also defined by the expression of several transcription factors and cell surface proteins. The transcription factors Oct-4, Nanog, and Sox2 form the core regulatory network that ensures the suppression of genes that lead to differentiation and the maintenance of pluripotency. The cell surface antigens most commonly used to identify hES cells are the glycolipids stage specific embryonic antigen 3 and 4, and the keratan sulfate antigens Tra-1-60 and Tra-1-81. The molecular definition of a stem cell includes many more proteins and continues to be a topic of research.

By using human embryonic stem cells to produce specialized cells like nerve cells or heart cells in the lab, scientists can gain access to adult human cells without taking tissue from patients. They can then study these specialized adult cells in detail to try to discern complications of diseases, or to study cell reactions to proposed new drugs.

Because of their combined abilities of unlimited expansion and pluripotency, embryonic stem cells remain a theoretically potential source for regenerative medicine and tissue replacement after injury or disease. However, there are currently no approved treatments using ES cells. The first human trial was approved by the US Food and Drug Administration in January 2009. However, the human trial was not initiated until October 13, 2010, in Atlanta for spinal cord injury research. On November 14, 2011, the company conducting the trial (Geron Corporation) announced that it will discontinue further development of its stem cell programs. Differentiating ES cells into usable cells while avoiding transplant rejection are just a few of the hurdles that embryonic stem cell researchers still face. Embryonic stem cells, being pluripotent, require specific signals for correct differentiation – if injected directly into another body, ES cells will differentiate into many different types of cells, causing a teratoma. Many nations currently have moratoria or limitations on either human ES cell research or the production of new human ES cell lines due to their ethical controversies.

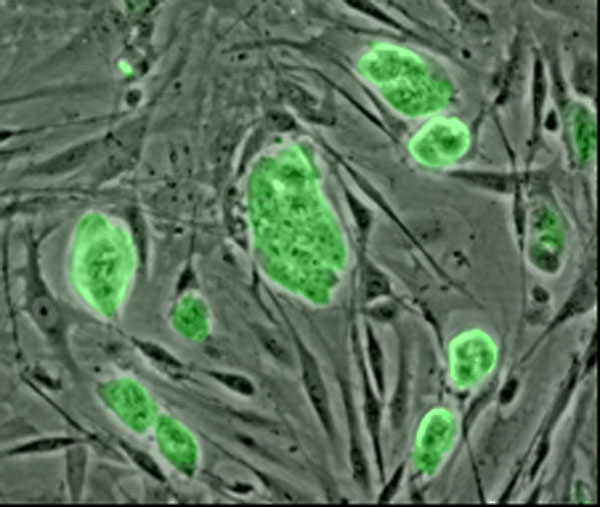
Mouse embryonic stem cells with fluorescent marker

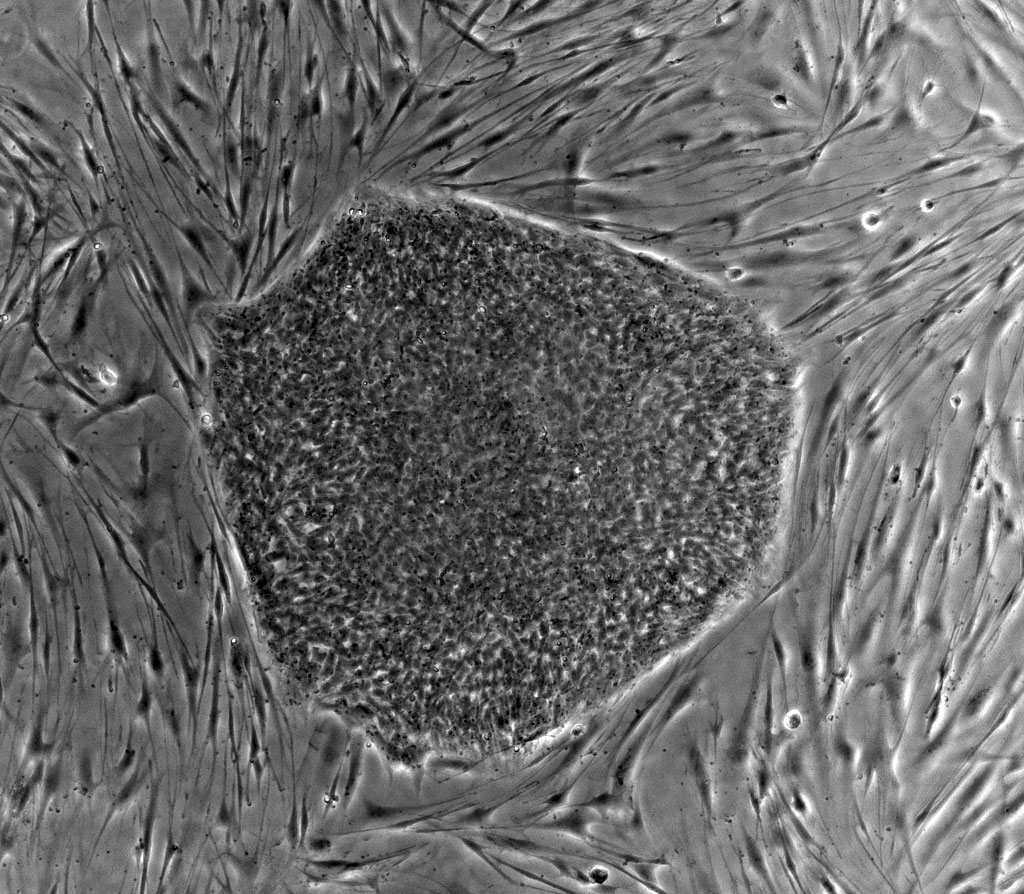
Human embryonic stem cell colony on mouse embryonic fibroblast feeder layer

The use of embryonic stem cells has generated significant ethical and political controversy. Central to the debate is the moral status of the human embryo, as deriving ES typically involves the destruction of early-stage embryos. Critics argue that this practice violates the sanctity of human life, and therefore is unacceptable.

=== Mesenchymal stem cells ===
Human mesenchymal stem cells

Mesenchymal stem cells (MSC) or mesenchymal stromal cells, also known as medicinal signaling cells are known to be multipotent, which can be found in adult tissues, for example, in the muscle, liver, bone marrow and adipose tissue. Mesenchymal stem cells usually function as structural support in various organs as mentioned above, and control the movement of substances. MSC can differentiate into numerous cell categories as an illustration of adipocytes, osteocytes, and chondrocytes, derived by the mesodermal layer. Where the mesoderm layer provides an increase to the body's skeletal elements, such as relating to the cartilage or bone. The term "meso" means middle, infusion originated from the Greek, signifying that mesenchymal cells are able to range and travel in early embryonic growth among the ectodermal and endodermal layers. This mechanism helps with space-filling thus, key for repairing wounds in adult organisms that have to do with mesenchymal cells in the dermis (skin), bone, or muscle.

Mesenchymal stem cells are known to be essential for regenerative medicine. They are broadly studied in clinical trials. Since they are easily isolated and obtain high yield, high plasticity, which makes able to facilitate inflammation and encourage cell growth, cell differentiation, and restoring tissue derived from immunomodulation and immunosuppression. MSC comes from the bone marrow, which requires an aggressive procedure when it comes to isolating the quantity and quality of the isolated cell, and it varies by how old the donor. When comparing the rates of MSC in the bone marrow aspirates and bone marrow stroma, the aspirates tend to have lower rates of MSC than the stroma. MSC are known to be heterogeneous, and they express a high level of pluripotent markers when compared to other types of stem cells, such as embryonic stem cells. MSCs injection leads to wound healing primarily through stimulation of angiogenesis.

=== Cell cycle control ===
Embryonic stem cells (ESCs) have the ability to divide indefinitely while keeping their pluripotency, which is made possible through specialized mechanisms of cell cycle control. Compared to proliferating somatic cells, ESCs have unique cell cycle characteristics—such as rapid cell division caused by shortened G1 phase, absent G0 phase, and modifications in cell cycle checkpoints—which leaves the cells mostly in S phase at any given time. ESCs' rapid division is demonstrated by their short doubling time, which ranges from 8 to 10 hours, whereas somatic cells have doubling time of approximately 20 hours or longer. As cells differentiate, these properties change: G1 and G2 phases lengthen, leading to longer cell division cycles. This suggests that a specific cell cycle structure may contribute to the establishment of pluripotency.

Particularly because G1 phase is the phase in which cells have increased sensitivity to differentiation, shortened G1 is one of the key characteristics of ESCs and plays an important role in maintaining undifferentiated phenotype. Although the exact molecular mechanism remains only partially understood, several studies have shown insight on how ESCs progress through G1—and potentially other phases—so rapidly.

The cell cycle is regulated by complex network of cyclins, cyclin-dependent kinases (Cdk), cyclin-dependent kinase inhibitors (Cdkn), pocket proteins of the retinoblastoma (Rb) family, and other accessory factors. Foundational insight into the distinctive regulation of ESC cell cycle was gained by studies on mouse ESCs (mESCs). mESCs showed a cell cycle with highly abbreviated G1 phase, which enabled cells to rapidly alternate between M phase and S phase. In a somatic cell cycle, oscillatory activity of Cyclin-Cdk complexes is observed in sequential action, which controls crucial regulators of the cell cycle to induce unidirectional transitions between phases: Cyclin D and Cdk4/6 are active in the G1 phase, while Cyclin E and Cdk2 are active during the late G1 phase and S phase; and Cyclin A and Cdk2 are active in the S phase and G2, while Cyclin B and Cdk1 are active in G2 and M phase. However, in mESCs, this typically ordered and oscillatory activity of Cyclin-Cdk complexes is absent. Rather, the Cyclin E/Cdk2 complex is constitutively active throughout the cycle, keeping retinoblastoma protein (pRb) hyperphosphorylated and thus inactive. This allows for direct transition from M phase to the late G1 phase, leading to absence of D-type cyclins and therefore a shortened G1 phase. Cdk2 activity is crucial for both cell cycle regulation and cell-fate decisions in mESCs; downregulation of Cdk2 activity prolongs G1 phase progression, establishes a somatic cell-like cell cycle, and induces expression of differentiation markers.

In human ESCs (hESCs), the duration of G1 is dramatically shortened. This has been attributed to high mRNA levels of G1-related Cyclin D2 and Cdk4 genes and low levels of cell cycle regulatory proteins that inhibit cell cycle progression at G1, such as p21^{CipP1}, p27^{Kip1}, and p57^{Kip2}. Furthermore, regulators of Cdk4 and Cdk6 activity, such as members of the Ink family of inhibitors (p15, p16, p18, and p19), are expressed at low levels or not at all. Thus, similar to mESCs, hESCs show high Cdk activity, with Cdk2 exhibiting the highest kinase activity. Also similar to mESCs, hESCs demonstrate the importance of Cdk2 in G1 phase regulation by showing that G1 to S transition is delayed when Cdk2 activity is inhibited and G1 is arrest when Cdk2 is knocked down. However unlike mESCs, hESCs have a functional G1 phase. hESCs show that the activities of Cyclin E/Cdk2 and Cyclin A/Cdk2 complexes are cell cycle-dependent and the Rb checkpoint in G1 is functional.

ESCs are also characterized by G1 checkpoint non-functionality, even though the G1 checkpoint is crucial for maintaining genomic stability. In response to DNA damage, ESCs do not stop in G1 to repair DNA damages but instead, depend on S and G2/M checkpoints or undergo apoptosis. The absence of G1 checkpoint in ESCs allows for the removal of cells with damaged DNA, hence avoiding potential mutations from inaccurate DNA repair. Consistent with this idea, ESCs are hypersensitive to DNA damage to minimize mutations passed onto the next generation.

== Fetal ==
The primitive stem cells located in the organs of fetuses are referred to as fetal stem cells.

There are two types of fetal stem cells:

1. Fetal proper stem cells come from the tissue of the fetus proper and are generally obtained after an abortion. These stem cells are not immortal but have a high level of division and are multipotent.
2. Extraembryonic fetal stem cells come from extraembryonic membranes, and are generally not distinguished from adult stem cells. These stem cells are acquired after birth, they are not immortal but have a high level of cell division, and are multipotent.

== Adult ==
Stem cell division and differentiation A: stem cell; B: progenitor cell; C: differentiated cell; 1: symmetric stem cell division; 2: asymmetric stem cell division; 3: progenitor division; 4: terminal differentiation

Adult stem cells, also called somatic (from Greek σωματικóς, "of the body") stem cells, are stem cells which maintain and repair the tissue in which they are found.

There are four known accessible sources of autologous adult stem cells in humans:

1. Bone marrow, which requires extraction by harvesting, usually from pelvic bones via surgery.
2. Adipose tissue (fat cells), which requires extraction by liposuction.
3. Blood, which requires extraction through apheresis, wherein blood is drawn from the donor (similar to a blood donation), and passed through a machine that extracts the stem cells and returns other portions of the blood to the donor.
4. Menstrual fluid

Stem cells can also be taken from umbilical cord blood just after birth. Of all stem cell types, autologous harvesting involves the least risk. By definition, autologous cells are obtained from one's own body, just as one may bank their own blood for elective surgical procedures.

Pluripotent adult stem cells are rare and generally small in number, but they can be found in umbilical cord blood and other tissues. Bone marrow is a rich source of adult stem cells, which have been used in treating several conditions including liver cirrhosis, chronic limb ischemia and endstage heart failure. The quantity of bone marrow stem cells declines with age and is greater in males than females during reproductive years. Much adult stem cell research to date has aimed to characterize their potency and self-renewal capabilities. DNA damage accumulates with age in both stem cells and the cells that comprise the stem cell environment. This accumulation is considered to be responsible, at least in part, for increasing stem cell dysfunction with aging (see DNA damage theory of aging).

Most adult stem cells are lineage-restricted (multipotent) and are generally referred to by their tissue origin (mesenchymal stem cell, adipose-derived stem cell, endothelial stem cell, dental pulp stem cell, etc.). Muse cells (multi-lineage differentiating stress enduring cells) are a recently discovered pluripotent stem cell type found in multiple adult tissues, including adipose, dermal fibroblasts, and bone marrow. While rare, muse cells are identifiable by their expression of SSEA-3, a marker for undifferentiated stem cells, and general mesenchymal stem cells markers such as CD90, CD105. When subjected to single cell suspension culture, the cells will generate clusters that are similar to embryoid bodies in morphology as well as gene expression, including canonical pluripotency markers Oct4, Sox2, and Nanog.

Adult stem cell treatments have been successfully used for many years to treat leukemia and related bone/blood cancers through bone marrow transplants. Adult stem cells are also used in veterinary medicine to treat tendon and ligament injuries in horses.

The use of adult stem cells in research and therapy is not as controversial as the use of embryonic stem cells, because the production of adult stem cells does not require the destruction of an embryo. Additionally, in instances where adult stem cells are obtained from the intended recipient (an autograft), the risk of rejection is essentially non-existent. Consequently, more US government funding is being provided for adult stem cell research.

With the increasing demand of human adult stem cells for both research and clinical purposes (typically 1–5 million cells per kg of body weight are required per treatment) it becomes of utmost importance to bridge the gap between the need to expand the cells in vitro and the capability of harnessing the factors underlying replicative senescence. Adult stem cells are known to have a limited lifespan in vitro and to enter replicative senescence almost undetectably upon starting in vitro culturing.

=== Hematopoietic stem cells ===
Hematopoietic stem cells (HSCs) are vulnerable to DNA damage and mutations that increase with age. This vulnerability may explain the increased risk of slow growing blood cancers (myeloid malignancies) in the elderly. Several factors appear to influence HSC aging including responses to the production of reactive oxygen species that may cause DNA damage and genetic mutations as well as altered epigenetic profiling.

== Amniotic ==
Also called perinatal stem cells, these multipotent stem cells are found in amniotic fluid and umbilical cord blood. These stem cells are very active, expand extensively without feeders and are not tumorigenic. Amniotic stem cells are multipotent and can differentiate in cells of adipogenic, osteogenic, myogenic, endothelial, hepatic and also neuronal lines. Amniotic stem cells are a topic of active research.

Use of stem cells from amniotic fluid overcomes the ethical objections to using human embryos as a source of cells. Roman Catholic teaching forbids the use of embryonic stem cells in experimentation; accordingly, the Vatican newspaper "Osservatore Romano" called amniotic stem cells "the future of medicine".

It is possible to collect amniotic stem cells for donors or for autologous use: the first US amniotic stem cells bank was opened in 2009 in Medford, MA, by Biocell Center Corporation and collaborates with various hospitals and universities all over the world.

== Induced pluripotent ==
Adult stem cells have limitations with their potency; unlike embryonic stem cells (ESCs), they are not able to differentiate into cells from all three germ layers. As such, they are deemed multipotent.

However, reprogramming allows for the creation of pluripotent cells, induced pluripotent stem cells (iPSCs), from adult cells. These are not adult stem cells, but somatic cells (e.g. epithelial cells) reprogrammed to give rise to cells with pluripotent capabilities. Using genetic reprogramming with protein transcription factors, pluripotent stem cells with ESC-like capabilities have been derived. The first demonstration of induced pluripotent stem cells was conducted by Shinya Yamanaka and his colleagues at Kyoto University. They used the transcription factors Oct3/4, Sox2, c-Myc, and Klf4 to reprogram mouse fibroblast cells into pluripotent cells. Subsequent work used these factors to induce pluripotency in human fibroblast cells. Junying Yu, James Thomson, and their colleagues at the University of Wisconsin–Madison used a different set of factors, Oct4, Sox2, Nanog and Lin28, and carried out their experiments using cells from human foreskin. However, they were able to replicate Yamanaka's finding that inducing pluripotency in human cells was possible.

Induced pluripotent stem cells differ from embryonic stem cells. They share many similar properties, such as pluripotency and differentiation potential, the expression of pluripotency genes, epigenetic patterns, embryoid body and teratoma formation, and viable chimera formation, but there are many differences within these properties. The chromatin of iPSCs appears to be more "closed" or methylated than that of ESCs. Similarly, the gene expression pattern between ESCs and iPSCs, or even iPSCs sourced from different origins. There are thus questions about the "completeness" of reprogramming and the somatic memory of induced pluripotent stem cells. Despite this, inducing somatic cells to be pluripotent appears to be viable.

As a result of the success of these experiments, Ian Wilmut, who helped create the first cloned animal Dolly the Sheep, has announced that he will abandon somatic cell nuclear transfer as an avenue of research.

The ability to induce pluripotency benefits developments in tissue engineering. By providing a suitable scaffold and microenvironment, iPSC can be differentiated into cells of therapeutic application, and for in vitro models to study toxins and pathogenesis.

Induced pluripotent stem cells provide several therapeutic advantages. Like ESCs, they are pluripotent. They thus have great differentiation potential; theoretically, they could produce any cell within the human body (if reprogramming to pluripotency was "complete"). Moreover, unlike ESCs, they potentially could allow doctors to create a pluripotent stem cell line for each individual patient. Frozen blood samples can be used as a valuable source of induced pluripotent stem cells. Patient specific stem cells allow for the screening for side effects before drug treatment, as well as the reduced risk of transplantation rejection. Despite their current limited use therapeutically, iPSCs hold great potential for future use in medical treatment and research.

=== Cell cycle control ===
The key factors controlling the cell cycle also regulate pluripotency. Thus, manipulation of relevant genes can maintain pluripotency and reprogram somatic cells to an induced pluripotent state. However, reprogramming of somatic cells is often low in efficiency and considered stochastic.

With the idea that a more rapid cell cycle is a key component of pluripotency, reprogramming efficiency can be improved. Methods for improving pluripotency through manipulation of cell cycle regulators include: overexpression of Cyclin D/Cdk4, phosphorylation of Sox2 at S39 and S253, overexpression of Cyclin A and Cyclin E, knockdown of Rb, and knockdown of members of the Cip/Kip family or the Ink family. Furthermore, reprogramming efficiency is correlated with the number of cell divisions happened during the stochastic phase, which is suggested by the growing inefficiency of reprogramming of older or slow diving cells.

== Lineage ==
Lineage is an important procedure to analyze developing embryos. Since cell lineages shows the relationship between cells at each division. This helps in analyzing stem cell lineages along the way which helps recognize stem cell effectiveness, lifespan, and other factors. With the technique of cell lineage mutant genes can be analyzed in stem cell clones that can help in genetic pathways. These pathways can regulate how the stem cell perform.

To ensure self-renewal, stem cells undergo two types of cell division (see Stem cell division and differentiation diagram). Symmetric division gives rise to two identical daughter cells both endowed with stem cell properties. Asymmetric division, on the other hand, produces only one stem cell and a progenitor cell with limited self-renewal potential. Progenitors can go through several rounds of cell division before terminally differentiating into a mature cell. It is possible that the molecular distinction between symmetric and asymmetric divisions lies in differential segregation of cell membrane proteins (such as receptors) between the daughter cells.

An alternative theory is that stem cells remain undifferentiated due to environmental cues in their particular niche. Stem cells differentiate when they leave that niche or no longer receive those signals. Studies in Drosophila germarium have identified the signals decapentaplegic and adherens junctions that prevent germarium stem cells from differentiating.

In the United States, Executive Order 13505 established that federal money can be used for research in which approved human embryonic stem-cell (hESC) lines are used, but it cannot be used to derive new lines. The National Institutes of Health (NIH) Guidelines on Human Stem Cell Research, effective July 7, 2009, implemented the Executive Order 13505 by establishing criteria which hESC lines must meet to be approved for funding. The NIH Human Embryonic Stem Cell Registry can be accessed online and has updated information on cell lines eligible for NIH funding. There are 486 approved lines as of January 2022.

== Therapies ==
Stem cell therapy is the use of stem cells to treat or prevent a disease or condition. Bone marrow transplant is a form of stem cell therapy that has been used for many years because it has proven to be effective in clinical trials. Stem cell implantation may help in strengthening the left-ventricle of the heart, as well as retaining the heart tissue to patients who have suffered from heart attacks in the past.

For over 50 years, hematopoietic stem cell transplantation (HSCT) has been used to treat people with conditions such as leukaemia and lymphoma; this is the only widely practiced form of stem-cell therapy. As of 2016, the only established therapy using stem cells is hematopoietic stem cell transplantation. This usually takes the form of a bone-marrow transplantation, but the cells can also be derived from umbilical cord blood. Research is underway to develop various sources for stem cells as well as to apply stem-cell treatments for neurodegenerative diseases and conditions such as diabetes and heart disease.

=== Advantages ===
Stem cell treatments may lower symptoms of the disease or condition that is being treated. The lowering of symptoms may allow patients to reduce the drug intake of the disease or condition. Stem cell treatment may also provide knowledge for society to further stem cell understanding and future treatments. The physicians' creed would be to do no injury, and stem cells make that simpler than ever before. Surgical processes by their character are harmful. Tissue has to be dropped as a way to reach a successful outcome. One may prevent the dangers of surgical interventions using stem cells. Additionally, there's a possibility of disease, and whether the procedure fails, further surgery may be required. Risks associated with anesthesia can also be eliminated with stem cells. On top of that, stem cells have been harvested from the patient's body and redeployed in which they're wanted. Since they come from the patient's own body, this is referred to as an autologous treatment. Autologous remedies are thought to be the safest because there's likely zero probability of donor substance rejection.

=== Disadvantages ===
Stem cell treatments may require immunosuppression because of a requirement for radiation before the transplant to remove the person's previous cells, or because the patient's immune system may target the stem cells. One approach to avoid the second possibility is to use stem cells from the same patient who is being treated.

Pluripotency in certain stem cells could also make it difficult to obtain a specific cell type. It is also difficult to obtain the exact cell type needed, because not all cells in a population differentiate uniformly. Undifferentiated cells can create tissues other than desired types.

Some stem cells form tumors after transplantation; pluripotency is linked to tumor formation especially in embryonic stem cells, fetal proper stem cells, induced pluripotent stem cells. Fetal proper stem cells form tumors despite multipotency.

Ethical concerns are also raised about the practice of using or researching embryonic stem cells. Harvesting cells from the blastocyst results in the death of the blastocyst. The concern is whether or not the blastocyst should be considered as a human life. The debate on this issue is mainly a philosophical one, not a scientific one.

=== Stem cell tourism ===
Stem cell tourism is the part of the medical tourism industry in which patients travel to obtain stem cell procedures.

The United States has had an explosion of "stem cell clinics". Stem cell procedures are highly profitable for clinics. The advertising sounds authoritative but the efficacy and safety of the procedures is unproven. Patients sometimes experience complications, such as spinal tumors and death. The high expense can also lead to financial problems. According to researchers, there is a need to educate the public, patients, and doctors about this issue.

According to the International Society for Stem Cell Research, the largest academic organization that advocates for stem cell research, stem cell therapies are under development and cannot yet be said to be proven. Doctors should inform patients that clinical trials continue to investigate whether these therapies are safe and effective but that unethical clinics present them as proven.

== Research ==
Some of the fundamental patents covering human embryonic stem cells are owned by the Wisconsin Alumni Research Foundation (WARF) – they are patents 5,843,780, 6,200,806, and 7,029,913 invented by James A. Thomson. WARF does not enforce these patents against academic scientists, but does enforce them against companies.

In 2006, a request for the US Patent and Trademark Office (USPTO) to re-examine the three patents was filed by the Public Patent Foundation on behalf of its client, the non-profit patent-watchdog group Consumer Watchdog (formerly the Foundation for Taxpayer and Consumer Rights). In the re-examination process, which involves several rounds of discussion between the USPTO and the parties, the USPTO initially agreed with Consumer Watchdog and rejected all the claims in all three patents, however in response, WARF amended the claims of all three patents to make them more narrow, and in 2008 the USPTO found the amended claims in all three patents to be patentable. The decision on one of the patents (7,029,913) was appealable, while the decisions on the other two were not. Consumer Watchdog appealed the granting of the '913 patent to the USPTO's Board of Patent Appeals and Interferences (BPAI) which granted the appeal, and in 2010 the BPAI decided that the amended claims of the '913 patent were not patentable. However, WARF was able to re-open prosecution of the case and did so, amending the claims of the '913 patent again to make them more narrow, and in January 2013 the amended claims were allowed.

In July 2013, Consumer Watchdog announced that it would appeal the decision to allow the claims of the '913 patent to the US Court of Appeals for the Federal Circuit (CAFC), the federal appeals court that hears patent cases. At a hearing in December 2013, the CAFC raised the question of whether Consumer Watchdog had legal standing to appeal; the case could not proceed until that issue was resolved.

=== Conditions ===
Diseases and conditions where stem cell treatment is being investigated

Diseases and conditions where stem cell treatment is being investigated include:

- Diabetes
- Androgenic Alopecia and hair loss
- Rheumatoid arthritis
- Parkinson's disease
- Alzheimer's disease
- Respiratory disease
- Osteoarthritis
- Stroke and traumatic brain injury repair
- Learning disability due to congenital disorder
- Spinal cord injury repair
- Heart infarction
- Anti-cancer treatments
- Baldness reversal
- Replace missing teeth
- Repair hearing
- Restore vision and repair damage to the cornea
- Amyotrophic lateral sclerosis
- Crohn's disease
- Wound healing
- Male infertility due to absence of spermatogonial stem cells. In recent studies, scientists have found a way to solve this problem by reprogramming a cell and turning it into a spermatozoon. Other studies have proven the restoration of spermatogenesis by introducing human iPSC cells in mice testicles. This could mean the end of azoospermia.
- Female infertility: oocytes made from embryonic stem cells. Scientists have found the ovarian stem cells, a rare type of cells (0.014%) found in the ovary. They could be used as a treatment not only for infertility, but also for premature ovarian insufficiency (POI). New research posted in Science Direct suggests that ovarian follicles could be triggered to grow in the ovarian environment by using stem cells present in bone marrow. This study was conducted by infusing human bone marrow stem cells into immune-deficient mice to improve fertilization. Another study conducted using mice with damaged ovarian function from chemothearpy found that in vivo therapy with bone marrow stem cells can heal the damaged ovaries. Both of these studies are proof-of-concept and need to be furthered tested, but they have the possibility improve fertility for individuals who have POI from chemotherapy treatment.
- Critical Limb Ischemia

=== Production ===
Research is underway to develop various sources for stem cells.

=== Organoids ===
Research is attempting to generating organoids using stem cells, which would allow for further understanding of human development, organogenesis, and modeling of human diseases. Engineered 'synthetic organizer' (SO) cells can instruct stem cells to grow into specific tissues and organs. The program used native and synthetic cell adhesion protein molecules (CAMs) that help make cells sticky. The organizer cells self-assembled around mouse ESCs. These cells were engineered to produce morphogens (signaling molecules) that direct cellular development based on their concentration. Delivered morphogens disperse, leaving higher concentrations closer to the source and lower concentrations further away. These gradients signal cells' ultimate roles, such as nerve, skin cell, or connective tissue. The engineered organizer cells were also fitted with a chemical switch that enabled the researchers to turn the delivery of cellular instructions on and off, as well as a 'suicide switch' for eliminating the cells when needed. SOs carry spatial and biochemical information, allowing considerable discretion in organoid formation.

=== Risks ===
Hepatotoxicity and drug-induced liver injury account for a substantial number of failures of new drugs in development and market withdrawal, highlighting the need for screening assays such as stem cell-derived hepatocyte-like cells, that are capable of detecting toxicity early in the drug development process.

=== Dormancy ===
In August 2021, researchers in the Princess Margaret Cancer Centre at the University Health Network published their discovery of a dormancy mechanism in key stem cells which could help develop cancer treatments in the future.

== See also ==
- Cell bank
- Human genome
- Meristem
- Mesenchymal stem cell
- Ovarian stem cell
- Partial cloning
- Plant stem cell
- Regenerative biology
- Stem cell controversy
- Stem cell marker
- Stem cell laws and policy in Iran
