= Egg cell =

Female reproductive cell

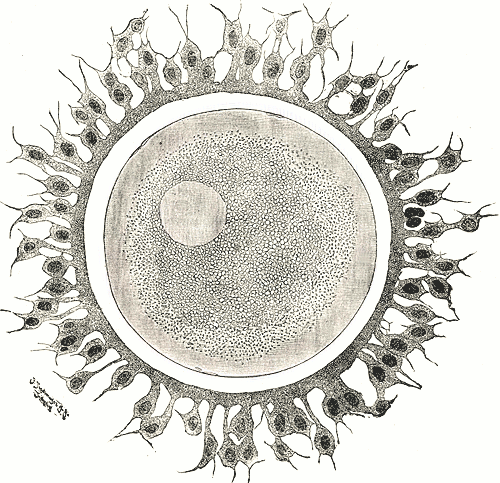
- A human egg cell with surrounding corona radiata

Details

Identifiers
- Latin: ovum
- Greek: ωάριον (ōárion)
- MeSH: D010063
- FMA: 67343

The egg cell or ovum (pl.: ova) is the female reproductive cell, or gamete, in most anisogamous organisms (organisms that reproduce sexually with a larger, female gamete and a smaller, male one). The term is used when the female gamete is not capable of movement (non-motile). If the male gamete (sperm) is capable of movement, the type of sexual reproduction is also classified as oogamous. The egg cell is produced and developed in the ovary. When egg and sperm fuse together during fertilisation a diploid cell called the zygote is formed, which rapidly grows into a new organism.

A nonmotile female gamete formed in the oogonium of some algae, fungi, oomycetes, or bryophytes is an oosphere. When fertilized, the oosphere becomes the oospore.

== History ==
While the non-mammalian animal egg was obvious, the doctrine ex ovo omne vivum ("every living [animal comes from] an egg"), associated with William Harvey (1578–1657), was a rejection of spontaneous generation and preformationism as well as a bold assumption that mammals also reproduced via eggs. Karl Ernst von Baer discovered the mammalian ovum in 1827. The fusion of spermatozoa with ova (of a starfish) was observed by Oskar Hertwig in 1876.

== Animals ==
In animals, egg cells are also known as ova (singular ovum, from the Latin word ovum meaning 'egg'). The term ovule in animals is used for the young ovum of an animal. In vertebrates, ova are produced by female gonads (sex glands) called ovaries. A number of oocytes (immature ova) ova are present at birth in mammals and mature via oogenesis.

Studies performed on humans, dogs, and cats in the 1870s suggested that the production of oocytes (immature egg cells) stops at or shortly after birth. A review of reports from 1900 to 1950 by zoologist Solomon Zuckerman cemented the belief that females have a finite number of oocytes that are formed before they are born. This dogma has been challenged by a number of studies since 2004. Several studies suggest that ovarian stem cells exist within the mammalian ovary. Whether or not mature mammals can actually create new egg cells remains uncertain and is an ongoing research question.

=== Mammals including humans ===
Diagram of a human egg cell

Labeled diagram of human egg cell

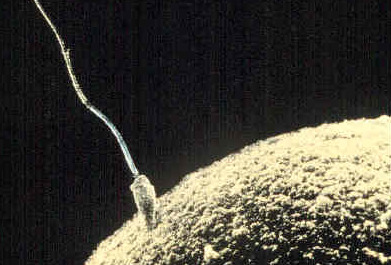
Ovum and sperm fusing together

The process of fertilizing an ovum (top to bottom).

In all mammals, the ovum is fertilized inside the female body. In the human ovary egg cells develop from primary oocytes to secondary oocytes in the processes of oogenesis and folliculogenesis.

The ovum is one of the largest cells in the human body, typically visible to the naked eye without the aid of magnification. The human ovum measures approximately 120 μm (0.0047 in) in diameter.

In humans, recombination rates in meiosis differ between maternal and paternal DNA:

- Maternal DNA: Recombines approximately 42 times on average.
- Paternal DNA: Recombines approximately 27 times on average.

=== Ooplasm ===
Ooplasm is like the yolk of the ovum, a substance of the cell at its center, which contains the nucleus, named the germinal vesicle, and the nucleolus, called the germinal disc.

The ooplasm consists of the cytoplasm of the ordinary animal cell with its spongioplasm and hyaloplasm, often called the formative yolk; and the nutritive yolk or deutoplasm, made of rounded granules of fatty and albuminoid substances imbedded in the cytoplasm.

Mammalian ova contain only a tiny amount of the nutritive yolk, for nourishing the embryo in the early stages of its development only. In contrast, bird eggs contain enough to supply the chick with nutriment throughout the whole period of incubation.

=== Ova development in oviparous animals ===
In the oviparous animals (all birds, most fish, amphibians and reptiles), the egg develops protective layers and pass through the oviduct to the outside of the body. They are fertilized by male sperm either inside the female body (as in birds and reptiles), or outside (as in many fish and amphibians). After fertilization, an embryo develops, nourished by nutrients contained in the egg. It then hatches from the egg, outside the mother's body.

=== Ovoviviparity ===
There is an intermediate form, the ovoviviparous animals: the embryo develops within and is nourished by an egg as in the oviparous case, but then it hatches inside the mother's body shortly before birth, or just after the egg leaves the mother's body. Some fish, reptiles and many invertebrates use this technique.

== Plants ==
Nearly all land plants have alternating diploid and haploid generations. Gametes are produced by the haploid generation, which is known as the gametophyte. The female gametophyte produces structures called archegonia, and the egg cells form within them via mitosis. The typical bryophyte archegonium consists of a long neck with a wider base containing the egg cell. Upon maturation, the neck opens to allow sperm cells to swim into the archegonium and fertilize the egg. The resulting zygote then gives rise to an embryo, which will grow into a new diploid individual, known as a sporophyte. In seed plants, a structure called the ovule contains the female gametophyte. The gametophyte produces an egg cell. After fertilization, the ovule develops into a seed containing the embryo.

In flowering plants, the female gametophyte (sometimes referred to as the embryo sac) has been reduced to just eight cells inside the ovule. The gametophyte cell closest to the micropyle opening of the ovule develops into the egg cell. Upon pollination, a pollen tube delivers sperm into the gametophyte and one sperm nucleus fuses with the egg nucleus. The resulting zygote develops into an embryo inside the ovule. The ovule, in turn, develops into a seed and in many cases, the plant ovary develops into a fruit to facilitate the dispersal of the seeds. Upon germination, the embryo grows into a seedling.

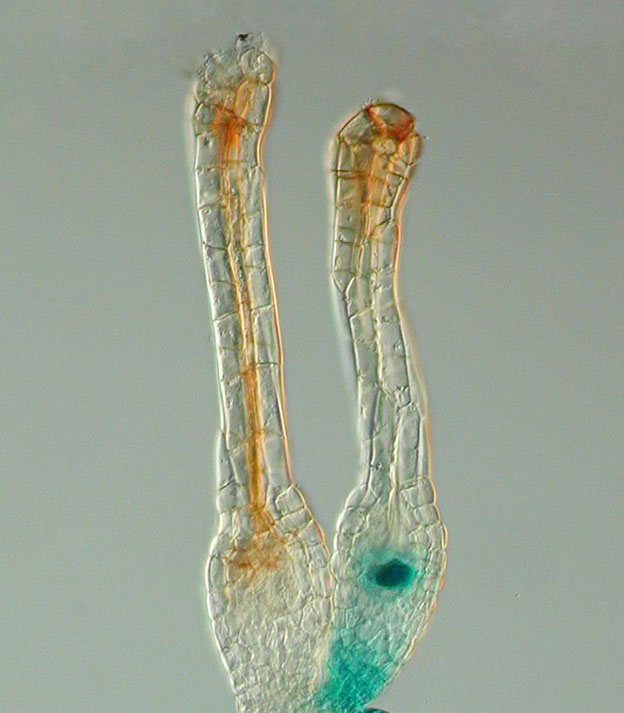
Gene expression pattern determined by histochemical GUS assays in Physcomitrella patens. The Polycomb gene FIE is expressed (blue) in unfertilized egg cells of the moss Physcomitrella patens (right) and expression ceases after fertilization in the developing diploid sporophyte (left). In situ GUS staining of two female sex organs (archegonia) of a transgenic plant expressing a translational fusion of FIE-uidA under control of the native FIE promoter

In the moss Physcomitrella patens, the Polycomb protein FIE is expressed in the unfertilised egg cell (Figure, right) as the blue colour after GUS staining reveals. Soon after fertilisation the FIE gene is inactivated (the blue colour is no longer visible, left) in the young embryo.

== Other organisms ==
In algae, the egg cell is often called oosphere. Drosophila oocytes develop in individual egg chambers that are supported by nurse cells and surrounded by somatic follicle cells. The nurse cells are large polyploid cells that synthesize and transfer RNA, proteins, and organelles to the oocytes. This transfer is followed by the programmed cell death (apoptosis) of the nurse cells. During oogenesis, 15 nurse cells die for every oocyte that is produced. In addition to this developmentally regulated cell death, egg cells may also undergo apoptosis in response to starvation and other insults.

== See also ==
- Insemination
- Menstrual cycle
- Ova bank
- Ovulation
- Polar body
- Pollination
- Pregnancy
- Spawn (biology)
