= Muse cell =

Endogenous non-cancerous pluripotent stem cell

A Muse cell (Multi-lineage differentiating stress-enduring cell) is an endogenous non-cancerous pluripotent stem cell. They reside in the connective tissue of nearly every organ including the umbilical cord, bone marrow and peripheral blood, and are collectable from commercially obtainable mesenchymal cells such as human fibroblasts, bone marrow-mesenchymal stem cells and adipose-derived stem cells as 1~several percent of the total population. Muse cells are able to generate cells representative of all three germ layers from a single cell both spontaneously and under cytokine induction. Expression of pluripotency genes and triploblastic differentiation are self-renewable over generations. Muse cells do not undergo teratoma formation when transplanted into a host environment in vivo. This can be explained in part by their intrinsically low telomerase activity, eradicating the risk of tumorigenesis through unbridled cell proliferation. They were discovered in 2010 by Mari Dezawa and her research group. Clinical trials for acute myocardial infarction, stroke, epidermolysis bullosa, spinal cord injury, amyotrophic lateral sclerosis, acute respiratory distress syndrome (ARDS) related to novel coronavirus (SARS-CoV-2) infection, are conducted. A physician-led clinical trial for neonatal hypoxic-ischemic encephalopathy was also started. The summary results of a randomized double-blind placebo-controlled clinical trial in patients with stroke was announced.

== Characteristics ==
- Stress-tolerant.
- Do not show tumorigenicity. Resistant to genotoxic stresses due to efficient sensing of DNA damage and activation of DNA repair systems.
- Can be isolated as cells positive for SSEA-3, a well known human embryonic stem cell marker. Needless to inform that the positive SSEA-3 cells or Muse cells are fresh for maximum one day after sorting and if you sort the same cells after 5 days for instance, you only collect about the same percentage of Muse or positive signal you got before first sorting .
- Pluripotent stem cells, which can generate various kinds of the cells representative of all three germ layers have the ability to self-renew.
- Non-tumorigenic. Low telomerase activity.
- Nearly all organs produce sphingosine-1-phosphate (S1P) upon damage. Muse cells expressing S1P receptor 2 selectively migrate to the site of damage by intravenous or local injections.
- Replenish new functional cells through spontaneous differentiation into tissue-compatible cells after homing to damaged tissue.
- Repair tissue by systemic administration.
- Comprise ~0.03% of bone marrow transplantation and several % of mesenchymal stem cell transplantation.
- Have immunosuppressive and immunomodulatory effect.
- Pluripotent stem cells can be directly obtained from normal human tissues without using artificial manipulations such as gene introduction.
- Intravenous injection of donor-Muse cells can be directly used for treatment without HLA-matching test or immunosuppressant treatment due to the specific immune privilege.

== Markers ==
Muse cells are identified as cells positive for SSEA-3+, a well-known marker for undifferentiated human ES cells. Their size is 13~15 μm in diameter. Muse cells do not express CD34 (markers for hematopoietic stem cells, adipose stem cells, VSELs) and CD117 (hematopoietic stem cells markers), Snai1 and Slug (skin-derived precursors markers), CD271 and Sox10 (neural crest-derived stem cells markers), NG2 and CD146 (perivascular cells) or CD31 and von Willebrand factor (endothelial progenitor markers). This indicates that Muse cells do not belong to previously investigated stem cell types.

== Differentiation capacity ==
=== In vitro ===
Muse cells can differentiate into:

1. Ectodermal- (cells positive for nestin, NeuroD, Musashi, neurofilament, MAP-2, melanocyte markers (tyrosinase, MITF, gf100, TRP-1, DCT)),
2. Mesodermal- (brachyury, Nkx2-5, smooth muscle actin, osteocalcin, oil red-(+) lipid droplets, desmin)
3. Endodermal- (GATA-6, α-fetoprotein, cytokeratin-7, albumin) lineages both spontaneously and under cytokine induction.
4. After homing to damage tissue by S1P-S1PR2, Muse cells phagocytose damaged cells, similar to macrophages. They then recycle the differentiation signals (e.g., transcription factors) obtained from the damaged cells and rapidly differentiate into the same cell type as the damaged cell.

=== In vivo ===
Muse cells are shown to home into the damage site by S1P-S1P receptor 2 axis and spontaneously differentiate into tissue-compatible cells according to the microenvironment to contribute to tissue regeneration when infused into the blood stream as shown in animal models with fulminant hepatitis, partial hepatectomy, muscle degeneration, epidermolysis bullosa, skin injury, stroke and spinal cord injury. The spontaneous differentiation into tissue-compatible cells was explained by the phagocytosis-dependent differentaition: after homing to damaged tissue, Muse cells phagocytose damaged cells, similar to macrophages, recycle the differentiation signals (e.g., transcription factors) obtained from the damaged cells and rapidly differentiate into the same cell type as the damaged cell.

== Non-tumorigenicity ==
=== Low telomerase activity ===
Muse cells are characterized by low telomerase activity, not a strong indicator of tumorigenicity. Hela cells and human fibroblast-derived iPS cells showed high telomerase activity while Muse was at nearly the same level as that in somatic cells such as fibroblasts (these data are shown without running control for the telomerase activity, the comparison is not scientific thought). This indicates the non-tumorigenic nature of Muse cells.

=== Expression of genes related to pluripotency and cell cycle ===
The expression 'pattern' of genes related to pluripotency in Muse cells was almost the same as that in ES and iPS cells, while the expression 'level' was much higher in ES and iPS cells and that in Muse cells. In contrast, genes related to cell cycle progression and tumorigenicity in Muse cells were at the same level as those in somatic cells, while the same genes were very high in ES and iPS cells. These gene expression pattern and level may explain why Muse cells are pluripotent but without tumorigenic activity.

=== Transplantation into mouse testes ===
Unlike ES and iPS cells, transplanted Muse cells in testes of immunodeficient mice -a commonly used experiment to test the tumorigenicity of stem cells- have not been reported to form teratomas, even after six months. Thus, Muse cells are pluripotent but are non-tumorigenic. Similarly, epiblast stem cells cultured under certain conditions also do not form teratomas in testes, even though they show pluripotency in vitro. Thus, pluripotent stem cells do not always show teratoma formation when transplanted in vivo.

== Tissue repair ==
Muse cells act as tissue repairing cells in vivo. When systemically administrated, naive Muse cells (without cytokine treatment or gene introduction) migrate to damaged site, home into the site and spontaneously differentiate into tissue-compatible cells to replenish new functional cells. This phenomenon was observed by the infusion of green fluorescent protein-labeled naive human Muse cells into animal models with fulminant hepatitis, partial hepatectomy, muscle degeneration, skin injury, stroke and spinal cord injury. Infused Muse cells integrated into each damaged tissue and differentiated into human albumin- and human anti-trypsin-expressing hepatocytes in the liver, human dystrophin-expressing cells in the muscle, neurofilament and MAP-2-expressing neuronal cells in the spinal cord and brain, desmoglein-3-, cytokerain14- and cytokeratin 15-expressing epidermal cells in the skin, glomerular cells in the kidney, corneal epithelial cells in the cornea and physiologically functional cardiac cells in the heart, respectively.

Muse cells have great advantages for regenerative medicine. Without need of cytokine induction or artificial gene manipulation, Muse cells are capable of repairing tissues when directly infused into the blood stream. Hence, the clinical applications of Muse cells appear promising.

== Basic characteristics ==
Pluripotency, namely pluripotent marker expression, triploblastic differentiation and self-renewability, are recognized in Muse cells directly collected from BM aspirates, indicating that their characteristics are not newly acquired by in vitro manipulation nor are they modified under culture conditions.

=== Location in vivo ===
Muse cells are not generated by stress, cytokine induction or exogenous gene transfection. They are preexisting pluripotent stem cells that normally reside in the bone marrow, peripheral blood and connective tissue of every organ including the umbilical cord. [3][1][4][5][6] ] In the bone marrow, they represent one out of 3000 mono-nucleated cells. Other than mesenchymal tissues, Muse cells locate in connective tissue of every organ and in the peripheral blood.

=== Dual features of pluripotent stem cells/macrophages ===
Muse cells are pluripotent-like, express pluripotency genes at moderate levels, exhibit triploblastic-lineage differentiation, and self-renew at the single-cell level. After homing to damaged tissue, Muse cells phagocytose damaged cells, similar to macrophages. They then recycle the differentiation signals (e.g., transcription factors) obtained from the damaged cells and rapidly differentiate into the same cell type as the damaged cell. Because Muse cells are pluripotent-like, they can differentiate into multiple cell types that comprise various tissues.

=== Formation of clusters similar to embryoid body of ES cells in suspension ===
In cell suspension, Muse cells begin to proliferate and to form clusters that are very similar to embryoid bodies formed from ES cells in suspension. Muse cell clusters are positive for pluripotency indicators such as alkaline phosphatase reactivities, Nanog, Oct3/4, Sox2 and PAR4. One of remarkable properties of Muse cells is that they are capable of forming clusters from a single cell in suspension. A single Muse cell-derived cluster is shown to spontaneously generate cells representative of all three germ layers on a gelatin-coated dish, proving the pluripotency of Muse cells.

=== Proliferation speed ===
Muse cells proliferate at a speed of ~1.3 day/cell division in adherent culture. This is slightly slower than that of human fibroblasts (~1 day/cell division).

== Self-renewal ==
Muse cells are able to self-renew, maintaining their proliferative activity, pluripotency marker expression and a normal karyotype.

== Sources ==
Muse cells can be collected from bone marrow aspirate, whose collection is a well known procedure done daily in clinics. They can also be isolated from skin fibroblasts obtained via skin biopsy, adipose tissue obtained by liposuction and from the umbilical cord; a safe and non-invasive procedure often used for cosmetic surgery interventions Easy accessibility of Muse cells allows them to be auto- or allo-transplanted in regenerative clinical applications. Muse cells are also isolated from commercially available mesenchymal cell cultures, which ensure their availability and accessibility.

- General Sources. Muse cells can be obtained from:
  - Bone marrow aspirate
  - Adipose tissue and liposuction
  - Dermis
  - Umbilical cord
  - Commercially available culture cells such as:
    - Bone marrow-derived mesenchymal stem cells
    - Fibroblasts
    - Adipose-derived stem cells
- Bone marrow: Bone marrow mononucleated cells contain ~0.03% of SSEA-3 positive Muse cells. This ratio corresponds to one out of 3000 mono-nucleated cells.
- Dermis: Muse cells, detected as SSEA-3-positive cells, are located sparsely in the connective tissues of organs. In the human dermis, Muse cells are located in the connective tissues distributed in the dermis and hypodermis. Their location is not related to particular structures such as blood vessels or dermal papilla.
- Adipose tissue: Recently, Muse cells have been successfully isolated from adipose tissue and liposuction material. The characteristics of adipose tissue-derived Muse cells were consistent with those of Muse cells isolated from bone marrow aspirate and commercially available fibroblasts.
- Bone marrow mesenchymal stem cells contain about 1% SSEA-3 positive Muse cells.
- Human dermal fibroblasts contain around 1 to 5% SSEA-3 positive Muse cells.
- Adipose-derived stem cells (Lonza Co.) has around 1 to 7% SSEA-3 positive Muse cells.
- The overall percentage of Muse cells depends on the source of mesenchymal tissue as well as manipulation and number of mesenchymal cells utilized for isolation by cell culture technique.
- Muse cells were also recognized in mouse, rabbit, goat, pig, and canine

== Collection methods ==
Muse cells can be collected by several techniques:

- Cell sorting: By using SSEA-3, Muse cells can be isolated from tissues and commercially obtained cultured cells. When Muse cells are to be collected directly from tissue, cells are labeled with both SSEA-3.
- The procedure includes the following steps:
1. Preparation of mesenchymal cells from either dermal fibroblasts or fresh bone marrow-derived mononuclear cells.
2. Isolation of Muse cells by FACS as cells positive for SSEA-3.
3. M-cluster formation in suspension culture using single-cell suspension culture. The surface of the bottom of each culture dish or well must be coated with poly-HEMA to avoid adhesion of the cells.
- Long-term trypsin (LTT) treatment: For large-scale usage of Muse cells -for transplantation experiments for example- they could be enriched in naive cells by severe cellular stress conditions. The resulting population is called a Muse-Enriched Cell (MEC) population. The best conditions for Muse enrichment have been described as long trypsin incubation for 16 hours in skin fibroblasts and long trypsin incubation for 8 hours in bone marrow mesenchymal stem cells. However, the practical procedure for transplantation or differentiation purposes is the isolation of Muse cells from a bulk culture of skin fibroblasts or bone marrow MSCs as cells positive for SSEA-3.
- Severe cellular stress treatment (SCST): Muse cells can be isolated from lipoaspired fat by subjection to severe stress conditions that eliminate all other cell types except for Muse cells, which survive as a feature of their capacity for stress endurance. The resulting cell population contains a high number of Muse cells and therefore there is no need for cell sorting. The stress conditions included; long incubation with collagenase, low temperature, serum deprivation, and severe hypoxia for 16 hours. Finally, the digested material is centrifuged and the pellet is re-suspended in PBS and incubated with a red blood cell lysis buffer. Muse cells isolated by this method have been found to be distinct population from adipose stem cells.

== Basic difference from other mesenchymal stem cells ==
There are major differences between Muse cells and non-Muse cells within the mesenchymal cell population. When mesenchymal cells (sometimes called mesenchymal stem cells) are separated into Muse and non-Muse cells by SSEA-3 cell sorting, the following differences are observed:

- Muse cells (SSEA-3-positive) form clusters (similar to the embryoid bodies of ES cells) from a single cell in suspension, while non-Muse cells (SSEA-3-negative) do not proliferate successfully in suspension and thus do not form these distinctive clusters.
- Basic expression level of pluripotency genes in non-Muse cells is very low or undetectable level compared to Muse cells.
- Non-Muse cells do not exhibit tissue reparation when infused into the blood stream; while they do not integrate into the damaged tissue, they may indirectly contribute to tissue regeneration by their production of cytokines, trophic factors and anti-inflammatory factors.

== Muse cells as a primary source of iPS cells ==
In 2009, a study showed that only SSEA-3+ cells generate induced pluripotent stem (iPS) cells in human fibroblasts. In 2011, it was suggested that iPS cells are generated only from Muse cells. When the technique for generation of iPS cells was applied to both Muse and non-Muse cells, iPS cells were successfully generated only from Muse cells. In contrast, non-Muse cells did not show elevation in Sox2 and Nanog, master genes of pluripotent stem cells, even after receiving the four Yamanaka factors. These results support the elite model of iPS cell generation rather than the stochastic model. Divergent from their Muse cell origin, iPS cells showed tumorigenecity. Since Muse cells are originally pluripotent without tumorigenic activity, what the Yamanaka factors newly conferred to Muse cells was not 'pluripotency' but tumorigenic activity. These results collectively suggest that only preexisting cells with promising pluripotency can be programmed into iPS cells.

== Differentiation ability of Muse cells in vitro ==
Muse cells from different sources are capable of in vitro differentiation into various cell types.

=== Melanocytes: ===
Human dermal fibroblast-derived Muse cells are a practical source for melanocyte induction. Application of a cytokine induction system comprising Wnt3a, SCF, ET-3, basic fibroblast growth factor, linoleic acid, cholera toxin, L-ascorbic acid, 12-O-tetradecanoylphorbol 13-acetate, insulin, transferrin, selenium, and dexamethasone to both human dermal fibroblast-derived Muse and non-Muse cells induces only the Muse cells into L-DOPA–reactive functional melanocytes capable of melanin production in a 3D cultured skin model. The application of a set of cytokines also differentiates dermal-Muse cells into melanocytes.

=== Keratinocytes ===
Human adipose tissue-derived Muse cells differentiate into keratinocytes by spontaneous differentiation on a gelatin culture dish or by cytokine induction containing bone morphogenetic protein-4 and all trans retinoic acid.

=== Neuronal Cells: ===
Human bone marrow- and fibroblast-derived Muse cells spontaneously differentiate into neural lineage cells with a lower proportion on a gelatin culture. Cells expanded from single Muse cell-derived clusters on gelatin-coated culture dishes express the neural markers nestin (1.9%), MAP-2 (3.8%), GFAP (3.4%), and O4 (2.9%), suggesting the ability of Muse cells to differentiate into neural-lineage cells. The cells positive for MAP-2 or GFAP were increased following induction with basic fibroblast growth factor, forskolin, and ciliary neurotrophic factor.

=== Liver Cells: ===
Muse cells can spontaneously differentiate in vitro into hepatocyte lineage cells positive for DLK, alpha-fetoprotein, cytokeratin 19, and cytokeratin 18 on gelatin-coated culture dishes. In the presence of insulin-transferrin-selenium, dexamethasone, hepatocyte growth factor, and fibroblast growth factor-4, Muse cells differentiate into alpha-fetoprotein(+), albumin(+) cells.

=== Glomerular cells: ===
Muse cells differentiate in vitro into renal lineage-cells with increased expression of developmental renal markers WT1 and EYA1 compared with non-Muse cells after 3 weeks following the application of a cytokine induction cocktail containing all trans retinoic acid, activin A, and bone morphologic protein-7.

=== Cardiac cells: ===
Treatment of Muse cells with 5′-azacytidine in suspension culture; then transferring the cells onto adherent culture and treatment with early cardiac differentiation factors wingless-int (Wnt)-3a, bone morphogenetic proteins (BMP)-2/4, and transforming growth factor (TGF) b 1; further treatment with late cardiac differentiation cytokines including cardiotrophin-1 converted Muse cells into cardiomyocyte-like cells that expressed a -actinin and troponin-I with a striation-like pattern.

=== Adipocytes & Osteocytes: ===
Expanded cells from Muse clusters differentiate into adipocytes by the application of 1-methyl-3-isobutylxanthine, dexamethasone, insulin, and indomethacin. These induced adipocytes contain lipid droplets and stain positive for oil red O. In addition, Muse cluster expanded cells differentiate into osteoblasts positive for osteocalcin using dexamethasone, ascorbic acid, and β-glycerophosphate.

== In vivo reparative effect of Muse cells ==
Muse cells from different sources demonstrate reparative effects in animal disease models.

=== Acute myocardial infarction model ===
Rabbit autograft, allograft, and xenograft (human) bone marrow-Muse cells were intravenously administrated in a rabbit acute myocardial infarction model. In vivo dynamics of Muse cells showed preferential homing of the cells to the postinfarct heart at 3 days and 2 weeks, with ≈14.5% of injected Muse cells estimated to be engrafted into the heart at 3 days. The migration and homing of the Muse cells were shown to be mediated through the S1P (sphingosine monophosphate)-S1PR2 axis. After homing, Muse cells spontaneously differentiated into cells positive for cardiac markers, such as cardiac troponin-I, sarcomeric α-actinin, and connexin-43, and vascular markers, and GCaMP3-labeled Muse cells that engrafted into the ischemic region exhibited increased GCaMP3 fluorescence during systole and decreased fluorescence during diastole, suggesting their functionality as working cardiomyocytes. Infarct size was reduced by ≈52%, and the ejection fraction was increased by ≈38% compared with vehicle injection at 2 months, ≈2.5 and ≈2.1 times higher, respectively, than that induced by mesenchymal stem cells. Muse cell allografts and xenografts efficiently engrafted and recovered functions, and allografts remained in the tissue and sustained functional recovery for up to 6 months without immunosuppression. The similar therapeutic effect was observed in swine acute myocardial infarction model that received human-Muse cell intravenous injection.

=== Stroke and intracerebral hemorrhage models: ===
The neural regeneration capability of Muse cells has been demonstrated in several models. In a rat stroke model induced by ischemic-reperfusion of middle cerebral artery occlusion (MCAO), 3 × 10^{4} human dermal-Muse cells topically injected into three sites in the infarct area (each site received 1 × 10^{4} Muse cells) delivered statistically significant functional recovery compared to vehicle and non-Muse fibroblast cell-injected groups after ~2.5 months. The functional recovery was supported by the incorporation of human Muse cells into rat pyramidal and sensory tracts with normalized hind limb somatosensory evoked potentials. Similarly, topically injected human bone marrow-Muse cells integrate into infarct region and replenish new neuronal cells and oligodendrocytes in mouse permanent MCAO and mouse lacunar stroke models. In the mouse lacunar stroke model, human Muse cells-derived neuronal cells integrated into the pyramidal tract, leading to statistically meaningful functional recovery. In a mouse intracerebral hemorrhage model, topically injected human bone marrow-Muse cells spontaneously differentiate into neuronal cells. Mice recovered motor function and spatial learning and memory ability.

=== Liver cirrhosis and partial hepatectomy models: ===
Intravenously injected human bone marrow-derived Muse cells are able to repair an immunodeficient mouse (SCID) model of CCL4-induced liver cirrhosis. Human Muse cells spontaneously differentiate in vivo into hepatocytes without fusing with host hepatocytes, and express mature functional markers such as human CYP1A2 (detoxification enzyme) and human Glc-6-Pase (enzyme for glucose metabolism) at 8 weeks after homing. Human bone marrow-derived Muse cells injected intravenously into a partial hepatectomy model in SCID mice differentiate spontaneously into major liver components, namely hepatocytes (74.3% of green fluorescent protein-positive integrated Muse cells), cholangiocytes (17.7%), sinusoidal endothelial cells (2.0%), and Kupffer cells (6.0%) after migrating and homing into the injured liver. Non-Muse bone marrow MSCs are not detected in the liver from the early stage (~ 1 week) to the end-point in either model. In the pig hepatectomy model, allogenic Muse cell intravenous injection delivered liver tissue repair and functional recovery. In the rat partial liver transplantation model, intravenously injected human Muse cells effectively protected sinusoid endothelial cells and micro-vascular flows.

=== Chronic kidney disease model: ===
Human bone marrow-derived Muse cells injected intravenously repair SCID and BALB/c mouse models of focal segmental glomerulosclerosis without added immunosuppression. Injected human Muse cells preferentially integrate into the damaged glomeruli and spontaneously differentiate into cells expressing markers of podocytes (podocin; ~31%), mesangial cells (megsin; ~13%), and endothelial cells (CD31; ~41%) without fusing with host glomerular cells; attenuate glomerular sclerosis and interstitial fibrosis; and induce the recovery of renal function, including creatinine clearance.

=== Skin ulcers in diabetes mellitus: ===
Human adipose tissue-derived Muse-rich cells significantly accelerate wound healing in skin ulcers of a mouse type 1 diabetes model. Subcutaneously injected human Muse cells integrate into the epidermis and dermis and differentiate into keratinocytes, vascular endothelial cells, and other cell types in the dermis. Ulcers treated with human Muse cells heal faster with a thick epidermal layer than those treated with non-Muse cells, with a wound closure duration even shorter than that in wild-type mice.

=== Aortic aneurism model: ===
Therapeutic efficacy of intravenous injection of human bone marrow-Muse cells into a SCID mouse aortic aneurysm model was evaluated. At 8 weeks, infusion of human Muse cells attenuated aneurysm dilation, and the aneurysmal size in the Muse group corresponded to approximately 45.6% in the vehicle group. Infused Muse cells were shown to migrate into aneurysmal tissue from the adventitial side and penetrated toward the luminal side. Histologic analysis demonstrated robust preservation of elastic fibers and spontaneous differentiation of Muse cells into endothelial cells and vascular smooth muscle cells.

=== Epidermolysis bullosa model ===
Type XVII collagen (Col17)-knockout (KO) mice that simulate junctional EB and recurrent skin injuries received 5.0 × 10^4 human Muse cells or human non-Muse-mesenchymal stem cells (MSCs) by intravenous injection into the tail vein. Ex vivo imaging of dissected injured skin confirmed the homing of injected Muse cells but not of non-Muse-MSCs. Human Muse cells homed to the mouse epidermis expressed keratin 14 and human desmoglein-3. Notably, all the mice in the Muse group showed the linear deposition of human type VII COL (hCOL7) at the injury site of the mouse skin whereMuse-derived cells were intensively integrated. Similarly, four of the five mice in the Muse group showed the deposition of human COL17 in association with Muse cell-derived basal cells.

=== neonatal hypoxic-ischemic encephalopathy model ===
Seven-day-old rats underwent ligation of the left carotid artery then were exposed to 8% oxygen for 60 min, and 72 hours later intravenously transplanted with 1 × 10^4 of human-Muse and -non-Muse cells, collected from bone marrow-mesenchymal stem cells as stage-specific embryonic antigen-3 (SSEA-3)+ and -, respectively, or saline (vehicle) without immunosuppression. Muse cells distributed mainly to the injured brain at 2 and 4 weeks, and expressed neuronal and glial markers until 6 months. In contrast, non-Muse cells lodged in the lung at 2 weeks, but undetectable by 4 weeks. Magnetic resonance spectroscopy and positron emission tomography demonstrated that Muse cells dampened excitotoxic brain glutamatergic metabolites and suppressed microglial activation. Muse cell-treated group exhibited significant improvements in motor and cognitive functions at 4 weeks and 5 months. Intravenously transplanted Muse cells afforded functional benefits in experimental HIE possibly via regulation of glutamate metabolism and reduction of microglial activation.

=== Amyotrophic lateral sclerosis model ===
In G93A-transgenic ALS mice, intravenous injection of 5.0 × 10^4 Muse cells revealed successful homing to the lumbar spinal cords, mainly at the pia-mater and underneath white matter, and exhibited glia-like morphology and GFAP expression. In contrast, such homing or differentiation were not recognized in human mesenchymal stem cells but were instead distributed mainly in the lung. Relative to the vehicle groups, the Muse group significantly improved scores in the rotarod, hanging-wire and muscle strength of lower limbs, recovered the number of motor neurons, and alleviated denervation and myofiber atrophy in lower limb muscles. These results suggest that Muse cells homed in a lesion site-dependent manner and protected the spinal cord against motor neuron death.

=== Stx2-Producing E. coli-Associated Encephalopathy model ===
Shiga toxin-producing Escherichia coli (STEC) causes hemorrhagic colitis, hemolytic uremic syndrome, and acute encephalopathies that may lead to sudden death or severe neurologic sequelae. Severely immunocompromised non-obese diabetic/severe combined immunodeficiency (NOD-SCID) mice orally inoculated with 9 × 10^9 colony-forming units of STEC O111 and treated 48 h later with intravenous injection of 5 × 10^4 Muse cells exhibited 100% survival and no severe after-effects of infection. Suppression of granulocyte-colony-stimulating factor (G-CSF) by RNAi abolished the beneficial effects of Muse cells, leading to a 40% death and significant body weight loss, suggesting the involvement of G-CSF in the beneficial effects of Muse cells in STEC-infected mice. Thus, intravenous administration of Muse cells could be a candidate therapeutic approach for preventing fatal encephalopathy after STEC infection.

Corneal scarring

Human Muse cells, collected from lipoaspirate, were activated by forming spheroid in the dynamic rotary cell culture system. These activated Muse spheroids enabled ready differentiation into corneal stromal cells (CSCs) expressing characteristic marker genes and proteins in vitro. Implantation of Muse cells–differentiated CSCs (Muse-CSCs) laden assembled with two orthogonally stacked stretched compressed collagen (cell-SCC) in mouse and tree shrew wounded corneas prevented the formation of corneal scarring, increased corneal re-epithelialization and nerve regrowth, and reduced the severity of corneal inflammation and neovascularization. cell-SCC retained the capacity to suppress corneal scarring after long-distance cryopreserved transport.

Radiation injury model

An acute injury model of the gastrointestinal tract was created by administering 18 Gy radiation to the abdomen of mice. Intravenous injection of human umbilical cord-derived Muse cells increased the survival rate and the protection/repair of the gastrointestinal tract.

Spinal cord injury model

In a rat compression spinal cord injury model, functional recovery was observed when human Muse cells were administered intravascularly during the acute and subacute stages.

== Muse cells in clinical data ==
Muse cells are present in the human bone marrow of healthy donors. The number of peripheral blood-Muse cells is drastically elevated in stroke patients 24 h after onset. In acute myocardial infarction patients, peripheral blood-Muse cells significantly increase 24 h after onset, concomitant with an increase in serum sphingosine-1-phosphate, and return to baseline levels with 2~3 weeks. Importantly, patients with an increased peripheral blood-Muse cell number in the acute phase show cardiac function recovery and avoidance of heart failure at 6 months after onset, suggesting the reparative function of endogenous Muse cells.

== Regenerative medicine ==
- Bone marrow transplantation: Muse cells are a subpopulation of bone marrow cells. They represent a small population of mono-nucleated bone marrow cells (~0.03%). This means that they have already been supplied to patients many times all over the world in bone marrow transplantations; a well-known procedure that has been performed in clinics since 1958.
- Mesenchymal stem cell transplantation: Muse cells exist within cultured MSCs such as bone marrow mesenchymal stem cells and adipose-derived stem cells. MSC transplantation has been employed for repairing liver, heart, neural tissue, airway, skin, skeletal muscle, and intestine. Therefore, if Muse cells were purified or enriched, the effectiveness of currently performed MSC transplantation is expected to see vast improvements.
- Because Muse cells do not form teratomas in vivo, they could provide an ideal source of pluripotent stem cells for regenerative medicine and cell-based therapy.

== Clinical Trial ==
- Clinical trials for human Muse cell-based product CL2020 have been started in 2018, targeting acute myocardial infarction, stroke, epidermolysis bullosa, spinal cord injury, amyotrophic lateral sclerosis and acute respiratory distress syndrome (ARDS) related to novel coronavirus (SARS-CoV-2) infection.
- Investigator-initiated clinical trial for neonatal hypoxic-ischemic encephalopathy was conducted.
- Clinical trials for acute myocardial infarction, epidermolysis bullosa, and ALS have been published.
- The summary results of a randomized double-blind placebo-controlled clinical trial in patients with stroke was published. The primary endpoint of the clinical trial was patient safety for up to 52 weeks after administration of CL2020 and no adverse events that would prevent advancement of the clinical study were observed throughout the clinical study period. Prior to administration of placebo or CL2020, most patients had a modified Rankin Scale (mRS1)) score of 4 (moderately severe disability: unable to walk and attend to bodily functions without assistance) or 5 (severe disability:bedridden, incontinent, and requires continuous care and attention). At 52 weeks after administration, the proportion of responders in the CL2020 group was 68.2% (15/22 cases), and the difference between the CL2020 group and the placebo group (37.5%, 3/8 cases) was maintained at more than 30%.Evaluation of the efficacy at 52 weeks after administration revealed that 7 of 22 (31.8%) subjects in the CL2020 group achieved an mRS score of 1 (no significant disability despite symptoms: able to carry out all pre-stroke activities without assistance, such as return to work). No one in the placebo group achieved an mRS score of 1 within 52 weeks.

== See also ==
- Stimulus-triggered acquisition of pluripotency cell
- Induced stem cells
