= Stage-specific embryonic antigen 3 =

Glycosphingolipid in homo sapiens

Stage-specific embryonic antigen 3 (SSEA-3) is a glycosphingolipid, specifically, an oligosaccharide composed of five carbohydrate units connected to a sphingolipid, also known as globoside-5 (Gb5). Sphingolipids were originally discovered in 1884 by Johann Ludwig Wilhelm Thudichum who named them after the Sphinx of Greek mythology in reference to the unresolved riddle of their function. It is now known that sphingolipids function as key players in cell signaling and the SSEA-3 molecule as a whole plays a key role in identifying many types of mammalian cells with pluripotent and stem cell-like characteristics.
