= Partial cloning =

Method in cell biology

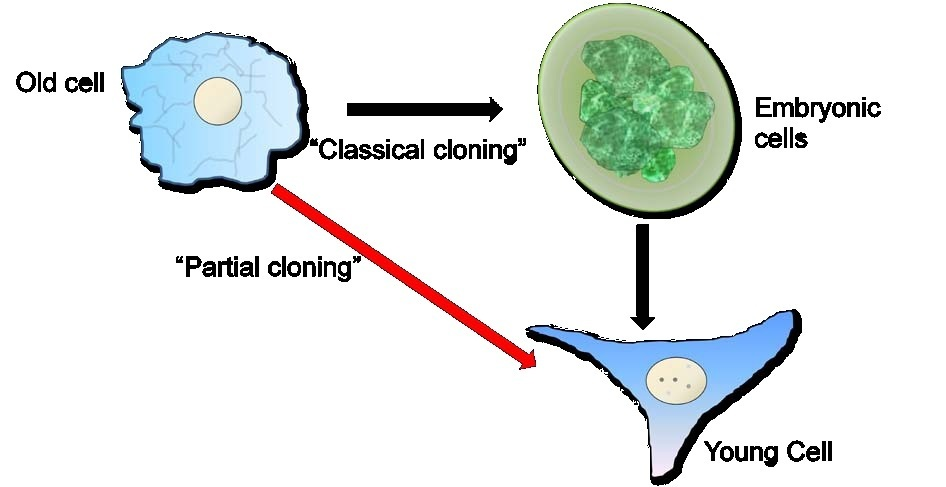
Relationship between fully differentiated "old" cells, pluripotent stem cells produced through classical cloning, and "young" cells produced by partial cloning.

In the field of cell biology, the method of partial cloning (PCL) converts a fully differentiated old somatic cell into a partially reprogrammed young cell that retains all the specialised functions of the differentiated old cell but is simply younger. The method of PCL reverses characteristics associated with old cells. For example, old, senescent, cells rejuvenated by PCL are free of highly condensed senescence-associated heterochromatin foci (SAHF) and re-acquire the proliferation potential of young cells. The method of PCL thus rejuvenates old cells without de-differentiation and passage through an embryonic, pluripotent, stage.

== Method ==
PCL consists of introducing a somatic adult or senescent cell nucleus or entire cell with enlarged membrane pores in an (activated) oocyte and to withdraw this treated cell before its de-differentiation and first cell division occurs. Thus, the progressive rejuvenation capability of the oocyte is used only temporarily in order to obtain a partial natural rejuvenation. PCL permits the envisaging of a chosen degree of partial rejuvenation by changing the duration of the introduction of the treated cell into the oocyte. Using PCL cell de-differentiation and its age reprogramming might be, at least partially, separable. Thus the existence of an isolated ageing clock would be confirmed at least during a certain part of the cellular evolution and involution.

== Application ==
The first experimental result shows a possible high efficiency in partial rejuvenation of senescent mouse cells. Notably PCL rejuvenates exclusively one single tissue or organ, in contrast to classical cloning PCL is therefore unable to reconstitute an entire organism. Furthermore, PCL is feasible in a few hours in opposition to classical cloning or induced pluripotent stem cells (iPS) which all need weeks or months.

Classical cloning can rejuvenate old cells but the process demands that the old cells must artificially pass through an embryonic cell stage. Partial cloning affords the advantage that the old cells to be rejuvenated do not have to pass through the embryonic cell stage and are simply made younger.

The extension of human lifespan, in terms of useful, quality, years added to life, has been a goal for many since time immemorial. And while a goal whose attainment was thought improbable, or at least achievable only in the far distant future, the discovery that animals can be cloned has brought the goal of rejuvenation much closer. The remarkable discovery that animals can be cloned showed that the nucleus of an old cell can be used as a donor in so-called “nuclear transfer” experiments where an old nucleus is transferred into a recipient egg whose own nuclear material has been removed. The “reconstructed” egg is then prompted to engage development and develops through an embryonic stage that results, once the embryo is implanted into a surrogate mother, in a newborn. Thus an old cell can give rise to a newborn, which has a typical lifespan: the age of the donor cell is “wiped clean” and returned to a youthful state. Notably, in classical animal cloning the rejuvenation process involves a return to an embryonic form. Thus the specialized functions of the adult cell are also “wiped clean” and returned to an embryonic cell type. And in classical cloning passage through this embryonic state is a must for the age of the cell to be “wiped clean”.

The key notion that exemplifies “partial” cloning from “classical” cloning is the separation of the mechanism(s) that “wipe clean” the specialization of a cell from those that “wipe clean” the age of the cell. In short, partial cloning aims to retain the specialized functions of a cell and simply make it younger, e.g., a skin cell is rejuvenated without having to pass through the embryonic stage that is a must for rejuvenation via the classical cloning technique (see diagram).

In a new laboratory at the Forschungszentrum Borstel our work on partial cloning focuses, inter alia, on the restricted, temporary, incubation of an “old” cell within the egg. In this way only the age of the cell is “wiped clean” and its specialized, differentiated, state is retained. It is simply made younger – rejuvenated - without going through the embryonic state. The measure of Diagram showing the difference between “Classical” and “Partial” cloning: Classical cloning (the route given by the black arrows) can rejuvenate an old cell but requires passage through an embryonic stage. “Partial cloning” (given by the red arrow) rejuvenates old cells without passage through an embryonic stage.“Partial cloning” (given by the red arrow) rejuvenates old cells without passage through an embryonic stage. In a new laboratory at the Forschungszentrum Borstel our work on partial cloning focuses, inter alia, on the restricted, temporary, incubation of an “old” cell within the egg. In this way only the age of the cell is “wiped clean” and its specialized, differentiated, state is retained. It is simply made younger – rejuvenated - without going through the embryonic state. The measure of rejuvenation in our system is, first, the re-acquisition of the ability of an old cell to divide, something that is lost in old cells and, second, the loss of characteristics that are associated with old cells.

Should such rejuvenation be achievable the consequences for medicine would be profound. It would avoid the need to artificially pass through an embryonic stage – either by nuclear transfer or by the so-called iPS cells method - to rejuvenate cells. One would simply be able to take aged cells from a patient and then return to the patient their own, histocompatible, rejuvenated heart cells, liver cells etc. In sharp contrast to the cycle of artificial de-differentiation of somatic cells to stem cells and then the artificial re-differentiation of stem cells to the desired differentiated cell type, which is highly inefficient, time-consuming and results in unstable cell types. The process of partial cloning would be efficient and rapid and thus cheap both in terms of materials and manpower. In short, partial cloning has enormous potential to relieve human suffering and disease: it is the most rapid and cheap route to successful regenerative medicine. Partial cloning also avoids the ethical problems associated with “classical” cloning in that it does not result in live born – it mere uses the oocyte briefly as a means to condition and thereby rejuvenate the old cell exclusively.
