= Yamanaka =

Yamanaka (written: 山中; lit: "middle of mountain") is a Japanese surname. Notable people with the surname include:

- Akira Joe Yamanaka, singer for the Flower Travellin' Band
- Akiko Yamanaka (born 1945), Japanese politician of the Liberal Democratic Party
- Chihiro Yamanaka, Japanese jazz pianist and composer
- Daichi Yamanaka (born 1990), Japanese speed-skater
- Hirofumi Yamanaka (born 1985), professional Japanese baseball player
- Hiroko Yamanaka (born 1978), retired Japanese female mixed martial arts fighter
- Kenichi Yamanaka (born 1943), retired Japanese Yudoka
- Ryuya Yamanaka (born 1995), Japanese boxer
- Lisa Yamanaka, Japanese Canadian actress and voice actress
- Lois-Ann Yamanaka (born 1961), Japanese American poet and novelist from Hawaii
- Miki Yamanaka (born 1990), Japanese jazz pianist working in New York City
- Miwako Yamanaka (born 1978), retired Japanese long-distance runner
- Noriko Yamanaka (山中 教子), Japanese female table tennis player
- Rikiko Yamanaka (山中 理貴子; born 1955), Japanese diver
- Ryosuke Yamanaka (born 1993), Japanese football player
- Ryuya Yamanaka (born 1995), Japanese female boxer
- Sadajirō Yamanaka (1866–1936), Japanese art dealer
- Sadao Yamanaka (1909–1938), Japanese film director and screenwriter
- Sawao Yamanaka (born 1968), the frontman of the bands The Pillows
- Seiko Yamanaka (born 1989), Japanese football player
- Sen Yamanaka (born 1958), Japanese politician
- Shino Yamanaka (born 1990), Japanese modern pentathlete
- Shinsuke Yamanaka (born 1982), Japanese professional boxer
- Shinya Yamanaka (born 1962), Japanese Nobel Prize-winning stem cell researcher
- Sumire Yamanaka (born 2001), Japanese female boxer
- Takeshi Yamanaka (山中 武司; born 1971), Japanese ice hockey player
- Tsuyoshi Yamanaka (born 1939), Japanese olympic swimmer
- Yamanaka Yukimori (1545–1578), Japanese samurai of the Sengoku period
- Yôko Yamanaka (born 1997), Japanese filmmaker

== Fictional characters ==
- Ino Yamanaka, a character in the Naruto Anime and Manga
- Inoichi Yamanaka, a character in the Naruto Anime and Manga
- Sawako Yamanaka, a character in the K-ON! Anime and Manga

== See also ==
- Lake Yamanaka, one of the Fuji Five Lakes in Japan
- Yamanaka Onsen, hot spring town in Ishikawa Prefecture
- Yamanaka, Ishikawa, former town located in Enuma District
- Meiden-Yamanaka Station, train station located in Okazaki, Aichi
- Yamanaka factors, regulators in cell reprogramming.
