= Clonogens =

Renewal cell of interest in pathology

Clonogen
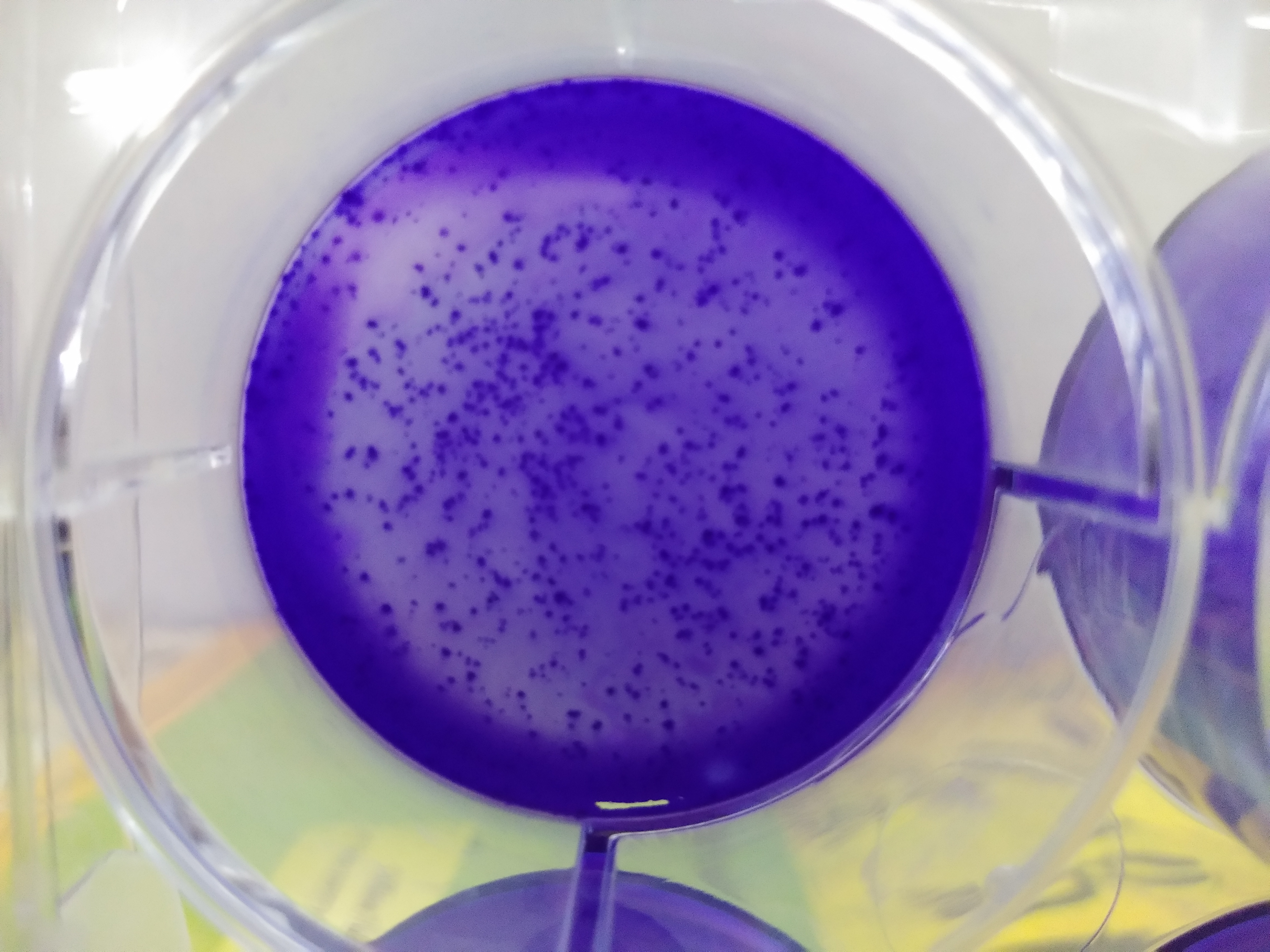
- Clonogenic assay displaying cultured clonogen colonies

Clonogens are cells that can self-renew and form colonies. They are found in both healthy tissues and tumors. Unlike most cells, clonogens can survive for a long time and are resistant to cancer treatments like chemotherapy and radiotherapy.

A clonogenic assay is an experimental technique widely used to assess the clonogenic traits of cells. Established in 1955, it was the first procedure to successfully isolate clonogens in tissues. Developments in clonogenic assays help researchers further distinguish clonogens from other stem and cancer cells. Such research expands the understanding of clonogenic stem-like properties driving cancer recurrence and resistance.

== Characteristics ==
Clonogens have several defining characteristics that distinguish them from other common transiently proliferating cells. The most notable features include self-renewal, colony formation, and resistance to therapeutic interventions.

Cancer stem cells can proliferate, self-renew, or differentiate further like clonogens, but additionally have key regulatory pathways that provide the full functional capacity of true stemness.

Clonogens can self-renew, which means they maintain their population while also differentiating into mature cell types. Clonogenic cells proliferate extensively, forming large colonies of at least 50 cells. Clonogens divide more rapidly and uncontrollably than normal cells by bypassing the usual checkpoints that regulate cell division. This is due to abnormalities in certain cellular pathways, such as MET/FAK, which allow clonogens to divide directly without the usual controls.

The most significant property of clonogens is their resistance to treatment. Studies toward clonogenic cancer cells have shown that they possess enhanced survival mechanisms. These properties suggest that clonogens share similarities with cancer stem cells (CSCs), particularly in their ability to regenerate a tumor after treatment. Some of them include:

- improved DNA repair, which targets DNA damage treatments induce, consequently preserving genes that code for key survival pathway proteins.
- inhibited apoptosis—a type of programmed cell death— by over-expressing inhibitory proteins or impairing pro-apoptotic proteins to ultimately activate anti-apoptotic pathways.
- over-expressing drug efflux pump proteins, expelling drug molecules from cancer cells and preventing enough accumulation needed to kill the cells.

== Mechanisms and functions ==
=== Role in normal tissue homeostasis ===
Clonogens in healthy tissues play essential roles in maintenance and regeneration as they can self-renew and produce specialised cells. In organs with frequent cell turnover—like the skin, intestine, and bone marrow—clonogens replenish lost or damaged cells. They also produce a set of regenerative cells that preserve the organs' clonogenic pool. However, since clonogens persist long-term, they are also more likely to accumulate DNA damage over time that can eventually lead to cancer initiation.

=== Role in cancer progression ===
Clonogens drive sustained cancer growth, spread, and recurrence. Unlike regular cancer cells, clonogens can proliferate indefinitely and also have survival mechanisms that significantly enhance their adaptability and resilience to treatments.

Various components from surrounding cancer tissues in the tumour microenvironment support clonogens to thrive by performing positive feedback that reinforces spreading seen in metastasis:

Cancer-associated fibroblasts (in purple) are established contributors of metabolic pathways. They support tumour cells to have a supportive microenvironment for their clonogens, and provide them enhanced metastatic capacity.

- Trefoil factor 3 (TFF3): TFF3 is a clinicopathological cancer biomarker. High levels of this protein are linked to larger and more aggressive tumors seen in higher disease grades.
  - Overexpression enhances clonogenic survival by disrupting proliferation signaling pathways.
- Cancer-associated fibroblasts (CAFs): CAFs reinforce clonogen survival, invasion, and metastasis by secreting signal molecules.
  - CAFs allow clonogens to undergo epithelial-mesenchymal transition (EMT), where clonogens detach from their tumour to migrate and form new tumours elsewhere. TGF-β signaling transforms the most outer membrane into an adhesive structure to make the clonogens mobile and invasive.
  - Educated by cancer cells, CAFs secrete growth factors (IL-6, CXCL12) as well as pro-angiogenic factors (VEGF, PDGF) that support blood vessel formation. These factors improve nutrient supply, creating a supportive microenvironment for clonogen expansion.

Standard therapies (chemotherapy and radiotherapy) treat cancer by targeting rapidly dividing cells. However, clonogens have special mechanisms that can help them tolerate the stress these treatments induce. As a result, these treatments fail to eliminate clonogens, which in turn survive to repopulate the tumour and later lead to cancer recurrence.

- DNA repair: Clonogens evade radiation therapy by upregulating DNA damage response pathways which efficiently fix radiation-induced DNA breaks.
- Drug pumps: ATP-binding cassette (ABC) transporters, such as clonogens' overexpressed drug efflux pumps, as well as enhanced reactive oxygen species (ROS) detoxification, actively removes chemotherapeutic agents from the cell. This reduces drug efficiency.
- Anti-apoptotic signals: Clonogens often upregulate anti-apoptotic proteins such as Bcl-2 family, which help them avoid programmed cell death.

Since clonogens evade traditional therapies, research supporting new therapeutic approaches that target them more specifically is needed to develop treatments that prevent recurrence.

== Evolution of clonogenic assay ==
A clonogenic assay, also known as a colony formation assay, is a widely used experimental technique that assesses how individual cells survive and grow after being exposed to toxic substances that can kill cells, such as chemotherapy drugs or radiation.

=== Traditional clonogenic assay ===
The traditional clonogenic assay, developed in 1955, involves growing single cells in a Petri dish at low densities. After a certain period of time, the assay measures the cells' ability to form colonies containing at least 50 cells. The number of colonies formed is used as a measure of the cells' ability to survive and grow.

However, the traditional clonogenic assay has some limitations. It may not accurately measure the number of slow-growing clonogenic cells, which can lead to an underestimation of the cells that are resistant to treatment. Additionally, using a fixed colony size (50 cells or more) to define a colony may not accurately reflect a cell's true ability to form colonies.

=== Advancements in clonogenic assay ===
To address the shortcomings of traditional assays, time-resolved clonogenic assays have been developed. This approach incorporates neural network-based image segmentation to track colony growth dynamics in real time. Instead of solely relying on final colony size, this method classifies clonogenic potential based on growth behavior over time, improving classification accuracy.

By providing more precise measurements of clonogen survival, these advancements enhance researchers' ability to evaluate the efficacy of new treatments and predict tumor recurrence risks more accurately.

== Clinical significance ==
Clonogenic assays are often used in cancer research to study how well both healthy and cancerous clonogenic cells recover after receiving a specific treatment. By comparing the number of colonies formed by treated cells to untreated cells, researchers can assess the effectiveness of the treatment.

=== Advantages ===
Clonogenic assays can be used to assess the true therapeutic effect on tumour control with substantial reliability. The ability to test healthy control clonogens in parallel provides a non-pathological reference for comparison. Clonogenic assays can help researchers study the inherent biological mechanisms within the tissue that contribute to treatment resistance, allowing them to better understand the true impact of cancer-specific factors on recurrence.

By detecting unintended effects on healthy clonogenic cells, clonogenic assays may reveal additional side effects that cannot be easily studied in other non-cancerous cells, as these cells would not survive the toxic effects of the treatments. As a result, clonogenic assays are usually regarded as the gold standard for radiosensitivity studies due to their in vitro ability to sustain viable cells for studying post-radiation treatment. They may similarly be used to also study DNA repair involved in acquiring treatment resistance.

=== Limitations ===
Although clonogenic assays have an established protocol that makes functional changes to clonogenicity accessible, the time and labour intensity required to follow it make the assay inherently susceptible to procedural errors. Additionally, the intrinsic genetic variation of clonogenic colonies introduces differences in ex vivo viability, as some may be too unstable to survive acclimatising to in vitro conditions. Moreover, the internal validity of healthy clonogen controls tends to be contested since they also express variation among cell populations, introducing inconsistencies to the standardised control.

Despite the vulnerabilities clonogenic assays bear, it is also argued that incomprehensive disclosure in research literature contributes to compromised methodological rigour. Excluding key data from reports—including those of replicates, radiation sources and dose rate—impedes the reproducibility of clonogenic assays, because prospective researchers lack the context they need to repeat and optimise future experiments.

== Oncological interactions ==
Clonogens are closely associated with cancer stem cells (CSCs), which are a small population of cells within a tumor that have the ability to self-renew and give rise to all the cell types found in a particular cancer. Both clonogens and CSCs tend to co-exist in cancerous tumors.

Not all clonogens are stem-like, but stem-like clonogens exhibit both the ability to differentiate into different cell types (differential potential) and the capacity to self-renew. Similarly, studies show that these characteristics in CSCs play roles in driving tumorigenesis (the formation and development of tumors), as well as metastasis (the spread of cancer to other parts of the body) and therapeutic resistance in aggressive cancers.

Research posits that clonogens might impact tumour heterogeneity measurably similar to cancer stem cells since they generally have more stem cell capacities than most progenitor cells.

=== Relationship with CSCs ===
Since cancer stem cells occupy a more apical end of the tumour hierarchy, they are classed as more primary cancer drivers due to their central impact on the tumour microenvironment (TME) which often activates clonogens, regardless of their stem-like properties. This relationship between cancer stem cells and clonogens allows CSC studies to help improve knowledge on clonogens by suggesting future research directions.

=== Epigenetic dysregulation ===
Cancer stem cell populations have a longer in vivo proliferative capacity because they possess greater variations of partial differentiation. Their genomic heterogeneity is sufficiently more stable to acquire adaptations that evade apoptosis.

As CSCs endure longer lifespans, descendant progenies accumulate more genetic mutations over time. They develop a higher potential to trigger large-scale mutation events, (kataegis, chromothripsis, and chromoplexy) attracting molecules that epigenetically dysregulate the TME, including its inhabitant clonogens.

=== Clonogenic enhancements ===
CSC-induced epigenetic modifications (DNA methylation, histone modifications) may activate or silence respective genes, increasing cellular plasticity in affected tissues by changing how accessible genes are for protein expression:

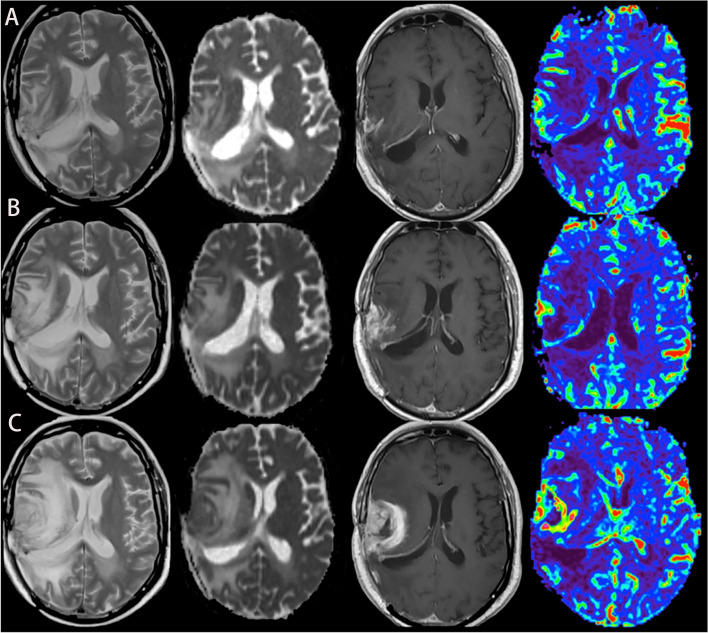
MRI scan depicting glioblastoma relapse during immunotherapy. The signal detected across all four sequences gradually increase over time, indicating tumor proliferation.

- Tumorigenicity: Cells' tumorigenicity may increase if oncogenes are switched on, if tumour suppression genes are switched off, or if the epigenetically modified cells can accumulate more mutations over time while remaining viable.
- Stem-like potency: Epigenetic changes also induce stem-like properties and self-renewal capacity in non-stemlike clonogens.
- Drug resistance: Clonogens' genes may be activated to produce proteins clinically associated as drug-resistant cancer biomarkers. Conversely, these genes may also be silenced, but this silencing may be reversed when the TME experiences stressful conditions induced by chemotherapy or radiotherapy. The consequent restoration of protein expression allows the tumour to become resistant to the therapy, even if the treatment may have initially controlled it.
- Cancer recurrence: Gene silencing may arrest the cell cycle, preventing apoptosis. The quiescence acquired may be randomly reversed after a long time has passed, resuming proliferation to cause cancer recurrence, similar to CSCs.

=== Preservation of clonogenicity ===
Clonogens remain distinct from CSCs because the tumour environment eventually reaches an equilibrium without driving the epigenetic reactions to completion. While the incomplete progressions cause the genomic instability attributed to clonogens, they further enhance cellular plasticity by introducing the additional possibility of more random mutations. These stochastic epigenetic mutations help clonogens express proteins to bypass signaling pathways they would otherwise rely on from the tumour microenvironment. By evading a stronger niche dependence, clonogens can survive without relying on the TME for stability. Their presence preserves tumour heterogeneity, increasing the chances of tumour regrowth through clonogenic survival.

== Therapeutic research directions ==
By using clonogenic assays to selectively isolate clonogens, studies have identified pathways (Hedgehog, Hippo, Notch and Wnt) driving their in vitro survival, thus identifying intermediates as cancer targets. Exosome engineering advancements have encouraged mechanistic studies on biomolecules by providing a way to overcome the body's poor bioavailability of natural compounds. Phytochemicals have shown promise at inhibiting cascades driving quiescence. Similarly, vitamin C has shown the potential to epigenetically silence protein expression involved in reducing niche dependence.

Clonogens are also being studied for future use as therapeutic tools. Mesenchymal stem cells (MSCs) are healthy clonogens that have been identified to migrate towards tumour microenvironments. As a result, cellular engineers are aiming to deliver vesicle-packaged inducers that programme MSCs to overexpress proteins downregulating key clonogenic cascades.
