= Double minute =

Small fragments of extrachromosomal DNA

Double minutes (DMs) are small fragments of extrachromosomal DNA, which have been observed in a large number of human tumors including breast, lung, ovary, colon, and most notably, neuroblastoma. They are a manifestation of gene amplification as a result of chromothripsis, during the development of tumors, which give the cells selective advantages for growth and survival. This selective advantage is as a result of double minutes frequently harboring amplified oncogenes and genes involved in drug resistance. DMs, like actual chromosomes, are composed of chromatin and replicate in the nucleus of the cell during cell division. Unlike typical chromosomes, they are composed of circular fragments of DNA, up to only a few million base pairs in size, and contain no centromere or telomere. Further to this, they often lack key regulatory elements, allowing genes to be constitutively expressed. The term ecDNA may be used to refer to DMs in a more general manner. The term Double Minute originates from the visualization of these features under microscope; double because the dots were found in pairs, and minute because they were minuscule.

== Formation ==
The most commonly proposed mechanism for DM formation is through chromothripsis, where up to hundreds of genomic arrangements occur in a single catastrophic event, and chromosome fragments which are not reintegrated join to create DMs. Specific models of DM formation other than chromothripsis have also been suggested. In the “deletion-plus-episome” model, also known as the “episome model,” DNA segments are excised from an intact chromosome, circularized, then amplified as DMs by mutual recombination. The “translocation-excision-deletion-amplification” model supports that during a translocation event, DMs are formed from the breakpoint region, in the process deleting the genes that are amplified from the chromosome. Another suggested mechanism is a multi-step evolutionary process, shown in the GLC1 cell line, in which a series of chromosomal mutation events within amplicons create subpopulations of DMs. Aside from these models, several studies suggest other processes for DM formation such as through the breakdown of a homogeneously staining region (HSR) following cell fusion, through chromosomal breaks due to hypoxia induced activation of fragile sites, or reduction in the level of DNA methylation.

== Role in gene amplification ==
DM formation is particularly important for its role in gene amplification. In addition to their ability to harbor genes, DMs are autonomously replicating, facilitating further gene amplification. The circular and less compressed structure of DMs also allows for an increased transcriptional level by having a more open conformation that is more accessible to transcriptional elements and contact with enhancers. The “breakage-fusion-bridge” cycle, which describes an event where telomere loss causes the repeated joining and pulling apart of sister chromatids as cell division occurs, is a popular model to explain the amplification of intrachromosomal genes. While this process does not directly produce DMs, it has been suggested as an early step in their formation, so may also contribute to gene amplification by DMs.

== Role in cancer ==
The presence of DMs in tumor cells is a somewhat rare occurrence, but certain cancers have been found to have a high incidence rate. An extensive cancer database search found that about 1.4% of all cases are positive for DMs, and out of cancer types, neuroblastoma has the highest frequency of DMs at 31.7%. The amplification of specific genes that support the growth of tumor cells, such as oncogenes or drug-resistant genes, is critical to the cell adoption of malignancy. Due to their role in gene amplification, the presence of DMs can therefore be a factor in acceleration of tumor growth. One example of this is DM facilitated amplification of the MYC gene in patients with acute myeloid leukemia, an event which is correlated with poor survival. Inducing the loss of extrachromosomally amplified genes in human tumor cells has been shown to reduce tumorigenicity, so the elimination of DMs or other ecDNA carrying oncogenes is one suggested avenue of cancer treatment research.

Aside from gene amplification, DMs play a role in cancer through driving tumor evolution and treatment resistance. While DMs lack the centromeres and telomeres usually essential for subdividing chromosome material during cell division, they can segregate to the daughter cell nucleus by associating with the telomeric ends of mitotic chromosomes. This process results in varied partitioning, and the unequal division in the number of DMs passed to offspring cells increases tumor heterogeneity, driving tumor evolution and increasing the chance of tumor cells acquiring a selective advantage. Amplified genes, in addition to residing in DMs, can also be located in the chromosomal HSRs. Inter-conversion between DMs and HSRs has been suggested as a mechanism for chemotherapy resistance, as oncogenes targeted by drug treatment are selectively eliminated from extrachromosomal DNA but reemerge after drug withdrawal.

== See also ==
- MicroDNA
- Micronucleus
- Extrachromosomal DNA (ecDNA)
- Extrachromosomal Circular DNA (eccDNA)
