= Clonogenic assay =

A clonogenic assay is a cell biology technique for studying the effectiveness of specific agents on the survival and proliferation of cells. It is frequently used in cancer research laboratories to determine the effect of drugs or radiation on proliferating tumor cells as well as for titration of Cell-killing Particles (CKPs) in virus stocks. It was first developed by T.T. Puck and Philip I. Marcus at the University of Colorado in 1955.

Although this technique can provide accurate results, the assay is time-consuming to set up and analyze and can only provide data on tumor cells that can grow in culture. The word "clonogenic" refers to the fact that these cells are clones of one another.

== Procedure ==
The experiment involves three major steps:

1. The treatment is applied to a sample of cells.
2. The cells are "plated" in a tissue culture vessel and allowed to grow.
3. The colonies produced are fixed, stained, and counted.

At the conclusion of the experiment, the percentage of cells that survived the treatment is measured. A graphical representation of survival versus drug concentration or dose of ionizing radiation is called a cell survival curve.

For Cell-killing Particle assays, the surviving fraction of cells is used to approximate the Poisson Distribution of virus particles amongst cells and therefore determine the number of CKPs encountered by each cell.

Any type of cell could be used in an experiment, but since the goal of these experiments in oncological research is the discovery of more effective cancer treatments, human tumor cells are a typical choice. The cells either come from prepared "cell lines," which have been well-studied and whose general characteristics are known, or from a biopsy of a tumor in a patient. The cells are put in petri dishes or in plates which contain several circular "wells." Particular numbers of cells are plated depending on the experiment; for an experiment involving irradiation it is usual to plate larger numbers of cells with increasing dose of radiation. For example, at a dose of 0 or 1 gray of radiation, 500 cells might be plated, but at 4 or 5 gray, 2500 might be plated, since very large numbers of cells are killed at this level of radiation and the effects of the specific treatment would be unobservable.

Counting the cell colonies is usually done under a microscope and is quite tedious. Recently, machines have been developed that use algorithms to analyse images. These are either captured by an image scanner or an automated microscope that can completely automate the counting process. One such automated machine works by accepting certain types of cell plates through a slot (not unlike a CD player), taking a photograph, and uploading it to a computer for immediate analysis. Reliable counts are available in seconds.

== Variables ==
The treatment is usually a drug, ionizing radiation, or a combination of the two. Some current research studies the potentiation of drug effects by concurrent irradiation—a synergistic effect—and in this situation two groups are studied: a control group, which is not treated with the drug; and a treatment group, which is treated with the drug. Both groups are irradiated. If the slopes of their survival curves differ significantly, then a potentiating effect may be evident and could be studied further. Since many tumor cells won't grow colonies in culture, cell proliferation assay, which has a satisfactory accuracy reportedly in measuring synergistic effects between ionizing radiation and drugs, may be used as a surrogate

A thorough discussion of the promising research being conducted with the aid of this technique is beyond the scope of this text, but some studies involve the effect of the expression of particular genes or receptors on the cell, the responses of different cell types, or synergistic effects of multiple drugs.

== See also ==
- Cancer
- Clonogens
- Microbiology
- Oncology
- Radiation Oncology
- Radiology
