= Extrachromosomal circular DNA =

Type of genomic structure

Extrachromosomal circular DNA (eccDNA) is a type of double-stranded circular DNA structure that was first discovered in 1964 by Alix Bassel and Yasuo Hotta. In contrast to previously identified circular DNA structures (e.g., bacterial plasmids, mitochondrial DNA, circular bacterial chromosomes, or chloroplast DNA), eccDNA are circular DNA found in the eukaryotic nuclei of plant and animal (including human) cells. Extrachromosomal circular DNA is derived from chromosomal DNA, can range in size from 50 base pairs to several mega-base pairs in length, and can encode regulatory elements and full-length genes. eccDNA has been observed in various eukaryotic species and it is proposed to be a byproduct of programmed DNA recombination events, such as V(D)J recombination.

== Historical Background ==
In 1964, Bassel and Hotta published their initial discovery of eccDNA that they made while researching Franklin Stahl's chromosomal theory. In their experiments, they visualized isolated wheat nuclei and boar sperm by using electron microscopy. Their research found that boar sperm cells contained eccDNA of various sizes. In 1965, Arthur Spriggs' research group identified eccDNA in the samples of five pediatric patients' embryonic tumors and one adult patient's bronchial carcinoma. In the following years, additional research led to the discovery of eccDNA in various species listed in Table 1:

Table 1: Species in which eccDNA has been identified
Year	Organism	Reference
1965	Boar sperm	Hotta and Bassel, 1965
1965	Human tumors	Cox et al., 1965
1969	Yeast	Billheimer and Avers, 1969
1984	Trypanosomatids	Beverly et al., 1984
1972	Euglena	Nass and Ben-Shaul, 1972
1972	Tobacco	Wong and Wildman, 1972
1972, 1978, 1980	Fungi	Agsteribbe et al., 1972; Stahl et al., 1978; Lazarus et al., 1980
1972, 1985	Cultured human fibroblasts	Smith and Vinograd, 1972; Riabowol et al., 1985
1976	Xenopus	Buongiorno-Nardelli et al., 1976
1978, 1984	Chicken bursa	DeLap and Rush, 1978; Toda and Yamagishi, 1984
1982	Human tissues	Calabretta et al., 1982
1983	Mouse embryo	Yamagishi et al., 1983
1983, 1988, 1990	Mouse tissues	Tsuda et al., 1983; Flores et al., 1988; Gaubatz and Flores, 1990
1983	Mouse thymocytes	Yamagishi et al., 1983
1983	Mouse lymphocytes	Tsuda et al., 1983

=== 21st Century Research ===
In the 21st century, researchers have focused on better characterizing the specific subtypes of eccDNA, as well as the structure and function of these molecules within biological systems:

- In 2012, Shibata et al. discovered a specific type of eccDNA called microDNA. The researchers found tens of thousands of microDNAs in mouse tissues and cell lines, as well as human cell lines.
- In 2012, Rausch et al. used whole-genome sequencing (WGS), cytogenetic analysis, and structural modeling to characterize the detailed chromosomal structure of extrachromosomal circular DNA in medulloblastoma.
- In 2018, Møller et al. used healthy human muscle and blood cell samples to identify over 100,000 types of eccDNA, which suggested that eccDNA could be found within somatic cells ubiquitously.
- In 2019, Wu et al. found that ecDNA (subtype of eccDNA) associates with chromatin, but unlike chromosomes it does not have higher-order compaction, which increases its accessibility.
- In 2021, Wang et al. elaborated on the formation of eccDNAs and identified the immunostimulant function of eccDNAs. They also developed an improved eccDNA purification protocol that decreases linear DNA contamination within purified samples.

=== eccDNA Purification ===
Historically, eccDNA was purified using a two-step procedure that involved first isolating crude extrachromosomal DNA and subsequently digesting linear DNA via exonuclease digestion. Yet, this technique often results in linear DNA contamination because exonuclease digestion is not sufficient to remove all linear DNA. In 2021, Wang et al. developed a three-step eccDNA enrichment method that improved eccDNA purification:

- The cells were first dehydrated in > 90% methanol. To extract crude extrachromosomal DNA, the cells were lysed with a pH 11.8 alkaline lysis buffer, neutralized with a neutralization buffer, and precipitated using a precipitation buffer. A commercial plasmid purification kit's silica column was used to isolate DNA from other cell components.
- The eluted DNA was digested with the restriction enzyme PacI to linearize mitochondrial DNA (mtDNA) and an exonuclease that can digest linear DNA.
- Finally, circular DNA was selectively recovered by a commercial solution and silica beads to remove linear DNA that was not removed by exonuclease digestion.

=== Double minutes (DM) vs. extrachromosomal circular DNA (eccDNA) ===
Initially, the term double minutes (DM) was commonly used to refer to extrachromosomal circular DNA because it often appeared as a pair in early studies. As research has continued, different subtypes of extrachromosomal circular DNA have been identified that are not double minutes (e.g., microDNA). In 2014, Barreto et al. identified that double minutes only comprise roughly 30% of extrachromosomal DNA. Thus, the term extrachromosomal circular DNA (eccDNA) is becoming more widely used, while the term double minutes is now reserved for a specific subtype of eccDNA.

== Structure ==
eccDNA are circular DNA that have been found in human, plant, and animal cells and are present in the cell nucleus in addition to the chromosomal DNA. eccDNA is distinguishable from other circular DNA in cells, such as mitochondrial DNA (mtDNA), because it ranges in size from a few hundred bases to megabases and is derived from genomic DNA. For example, eccDNA can be formed from exons of protein coding genes, like mucin and titin. Researchers have hypothesized that eccDNA may contribute to the expression of different isoforms of a gene by interfering with or promoting the transcription of specific exons.

eccDNA has been classified as one of four different categories of circular DNA based on size and sequence, including small polydispersed circular DNA (spcDNA), telomeric circles (t-circles), microDNA (100-400 bp), and extrachromosomal DNA (ecDNA). Each of these types has its own unique biological characteristics (see Table 2):

Table 2: Types of eccDNA
Name of eccDNA	Size	Characteristics	Function
spcDNA	100–10 kb	Highly diverse type of eccDNA, there is a large range of the number of spcDNA found cells	Involved in human genetic instability
Telomeric circles	multiples of 738 bp	Formed by telomeric arrays, which is a series of repeated sequences at the end of linear DNA.	Involved in the alternative lengthening of telomeres (ALT)
microDNA	100-400 bp	Derived from genomic locations that have a high GC content and exon density	Express small functional regulatory RNAs (e.g., microRNAs and new is-like RNAs).
ecDNA	1-3 Mb	Include full genes, no telomeres, acentric	Amplify genes involved in development of cancer and drug resistance

=== eccDNA biogenesis ===
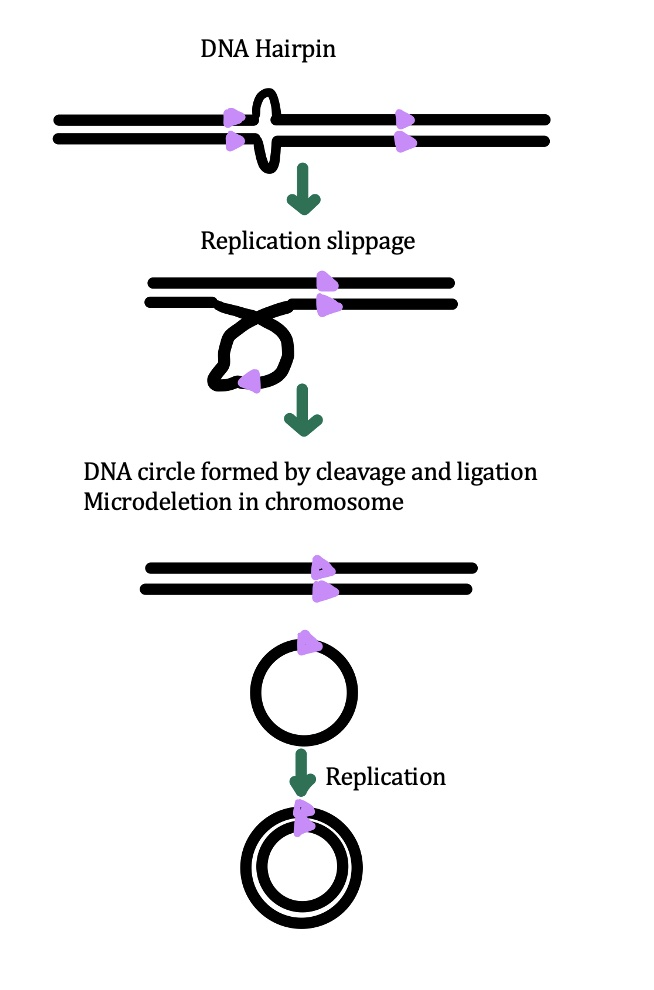
Formation of eccDNA via replication slippage

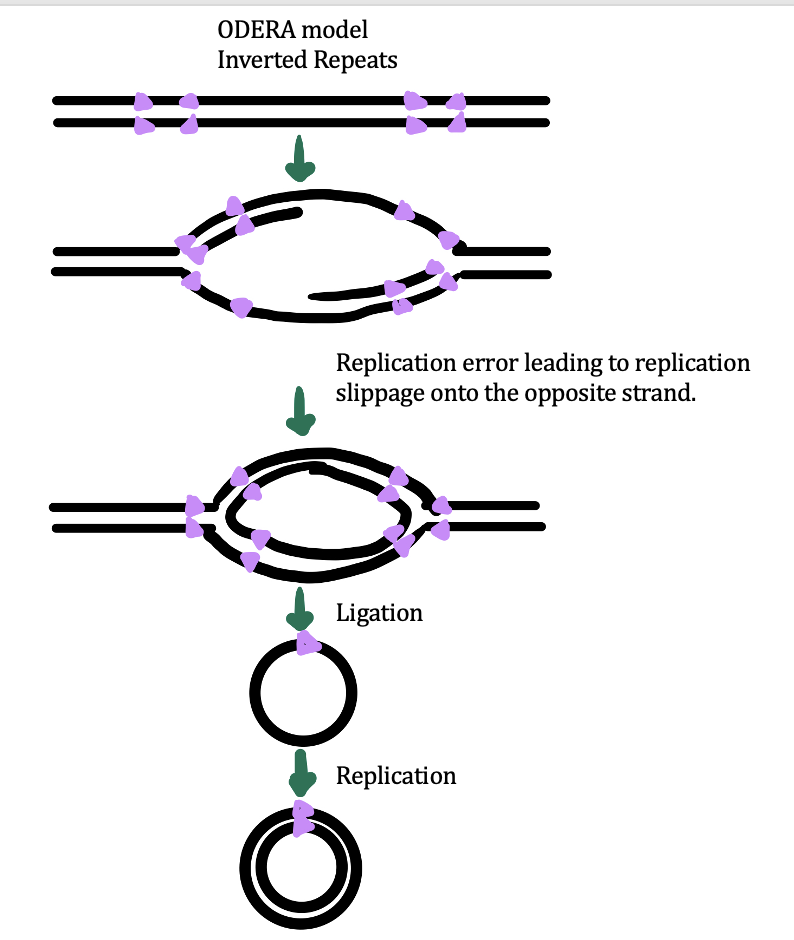
The ODERA mechanism of eccDNA formation

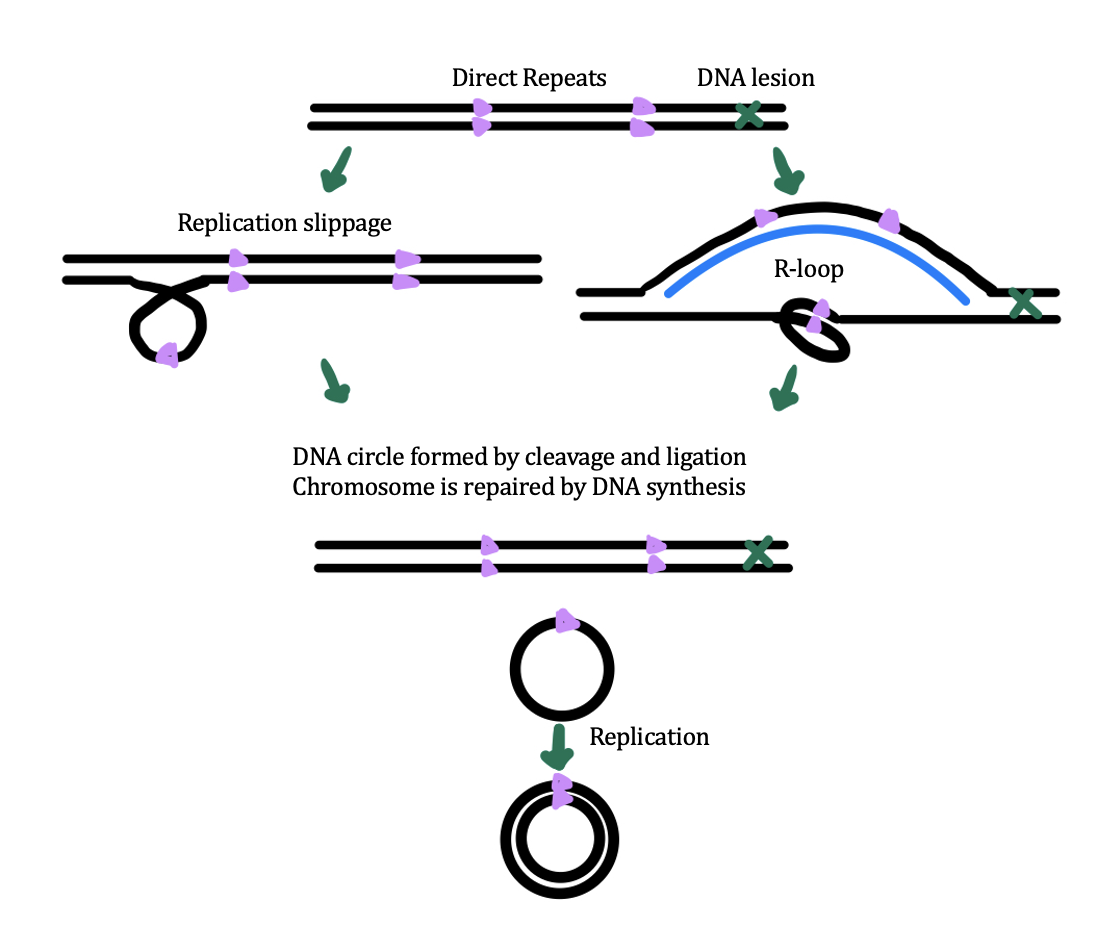
EccDNA formation via replication slippage no microdeletion

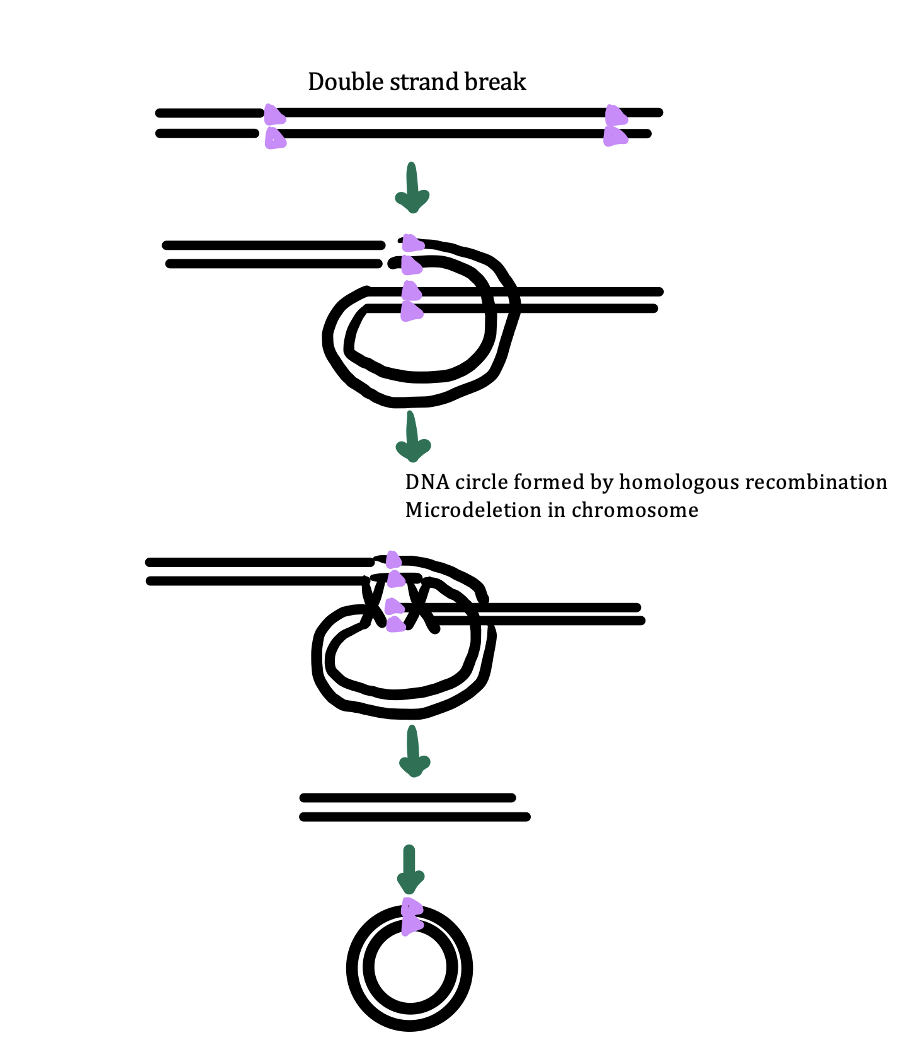
Double stranded break eccDNA formation

While the exact mechanism for eccDNA generation is still unknown, some studies have suggested that eccDNA generation might be linked to DNA damage repair, hyper-transcription, homologous recombination, and replication stress. There are multiple proposed mechanisms for eccDNA formation: (1) replication slippage creates a loop on the template strand that is then excised and ligated into a circle leaving a microdeletion on the chromosome, (2) replication slippage creates a loop in the product strand that is excised and ligated into a circle that does not generate a microdeletion in the chromosome, (3) the ODERA mechanism of eccDNA formation, and (4) a double stranded break in a repeat region is repaired by homologous recombination, during which the fragment forms a circle and the chromosome suffers a microdeletion

Research conducted in 2021 demonstrated that apoptotic cells are a source of eccDNAs; this was concluded on account of the study showing that apoptotic DNA fragmentation (ADF) is a prerequisite for eccDNA formation through purification methods.

eccDNA can be generated as a result of micro-nuclei formation, indicating chromosomal instability. It has been proposed that premature apoptosis and/or errors in chromosomal segregation during mitosis could lead to micro-nuclei formation.

=== eccDNA in non-cancerous cells ===
To test whether eccDNAs occur in non-cancer cells, mouse embryonic stem cells and Southern Blot analysis were used; the results confirmed that eccDNA is found in both cancerous and non-cancerous cells. It is also known that eccDNA is unlikely to be derived from specific genome regions; sequencing data from 2021 reports that the data suggests eccDNAs are widespread across the entirety of the genome. Genome mapping of full-length eccDNAs demonstrated their different genomic alignment patterns, which includes at adjacent, overlapped, or nested positions on the same chromosome or across different chromosomes. eccDNAs originate mostly from single, continuous genomic loci, meaning that one single genomic fragment self-circularizes to form the eccDNA, rather than being formed from ligation of different genomic fragments. These two variants can be classified as continuous and non-continuous eccDNAs, respectively. To further understand the reason behind the circularization of fragmented DNA, the three various mammalian ligase enzymes were tested: Lig1, Lig3, and Lig4. Using knockout models in the CH12F3 mouse B-lymphocyte cell line, research conducted in 2021 identified Lig3 as the main ligase for eccDNA generation in these cells.

== Function ==
The exact function of eccDNA has been debated, but some studies have suggested that eccDNAs might contribute to gene amplification in cancer, immune function, and aging.

=== eccDNA function in immune system ===
According to research conducted in 2021, another function of eccDNAs is their role as possible immunostimulants. eccDNA significantly induces type I interferons (IFNα, IFNβ), interleukin-6 (IL-6), and tumor necrosis factor (TNF), even more so than linear DNA and other generally potent cytokine inducers at their highest concentration levels. Similar patterns are observed with macrophages as the data showed that eccDNAs are very potent immunostimulants in activating both bone marrow-derived dendritic cells and bone marrow-derived macrophages. Additionally, experiments altered the eccDNA structure with one nick per eccDNA segment and subsequently treated with enzymes to generate linear versions of the eccDNA. In these experiments, cytokine transcription, an important marker for immune system activity, was shown to be much higher in the non-treated eccDNA compared to the linearized treatment, conferring that the circular structure of eccDNA rather than the genetic sequence itself gives the eccDNA its immune function.

=== eccDNA function in cancer ===
Some known functions of eccDNA include contributions to intercellular genetic heterogeneity in tumors, and more specifically the amplification of oncogenes and drug-resistant genes. This also supports that the genes on eccDNA are expressed. Overall, eccDNA has been linked to cancer and drug resistance, aging, gene compensation, and for this reason it continues to be a significant topic of discussion.

== Applications ==
=== Role in cancer ===
A subtype of eccDNA, such as ecDNA, ribosomal DNA locus (Extrachromosomal rDNA circle), and double minutes have been associated with genomic instability. Double minute eccDNAs are fragments of extrachromosomal DNA, which were originally observed in a large number of human tumors including breast, lung, ovary, colon, and most notably, neuroblastoma. They are a manifestation of gene amplification during the development of tumors, which give the cells selective advantages for growth and survival. Double minutes, like actual chromosomes, are composed of chromatin and replicate in the nucleus of the cell during cell division. Unlike typical chromosomes, they are composed of circular fragments of DNA, up to only a few million base pairs in size and contain no centromere or telomere.

Double minute chromosomes (DMs), which present as paired chromatin bodies under light microscopy, have been shown to be a subset of ecDNA. Double minute chromosomes represent about 30% of the cancer-containing spectrum of ecDNA, including single bodies, and have been found to contain identical gene content as single bodies. The ecDNA notation encompasses all forms of the large gene-containing extrachromosomal DNA found in cancer cells. This type of ecDNA is commonly seen in cancer cells of various histologies, but virtually never in normal tissue. ecDNA are thought to be produced through double-strand breaks in chromosomes or over replication of DNA in an organism.

The circular shape of ecDNA differs from the linear structure of chromosomal DNA in meaningful ways that influence cancer pathogenesis. Oncogenes encoded on ecDNA have massive transcriptional output, ranking in the top 1% of genes in the entire transcriptome. In contrast to bacterial plasmids or mitochondrial DNA, ecDNA are chromatinized, containing high levels of active histone marks, but a paucity of repressive histone marks. The ecDNA chromatin architecture lacks the higher-order compaction that is present on chromosomal DNA and is among the most accessible DNA in the entire cancer genome.

From eccDNA, matrix attachment regions (MARs) were found to activate amplification of oncogenes. Transfection of these MARs into human embryonic kidney 293T cells resulted in an increase in gene expression, suggesting that these eccDNA-derived MARs are involved in oncogene activation. eccDNA also appears to play a role in other cancers such as breast cancer, where oncogenes in human epidermal growth factor receptor 2 (HER2)-positive breast cancer genes in eccDNA are amplified. This eccDNA has also shown the ability to acquire resistance to therapies for receptor tyrosine kinases (RTKs), like HER26.

=== Role in aging ===
Yeast are model organisms for studying aging, and eccDNAs have been shown to accumulate in old cells and play a role in causing aging in yeast. Speculation continues on the generality of this concept in higher species, like mammals.

== See also ==
- Extrachromosomal DNA
- Extrachromosomal rDNA circle
- Double minute
- microDNA
- Selfish genetic elements
