= Chromothripsis =

Massive chromosomal rearrangement process linked to cancer

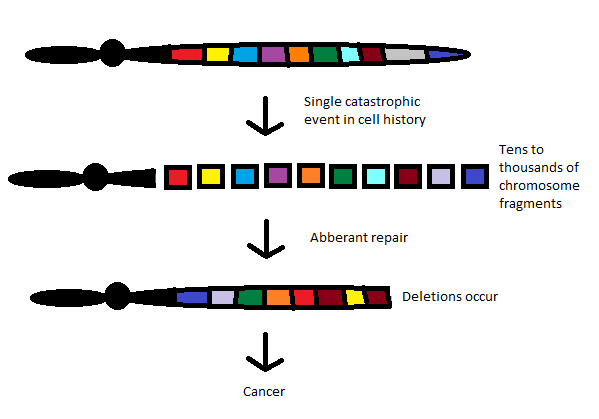
Chromothripsis: Single catastrophic event in a cell's history

Chromothripsis is a mutational process by which up to thousands of clustered chromosomal rearrangements occur in a single event in localised and confined genomic regions in one or a few chromosomes, and is known to be involved in both cancer and congenital diseases. It occurs through one massive genomic rearrangement during a single catastrophic event in the cell's history. It is believed that for the cell to be able to withstand such a destructive event, the occurrence of such an event must be the upper limit of what a cell can tolerate and survive. The chromothripsis phenomenon opposes the conventional theory that cancer is the gradual acquisition of genomic rearrangements and somatic mutations over time.

The simplest model as to how these rearrangements occur is through the simultaneous fragmentation of distinct chromosomal regions (breakpoints show a non-random distribution) and then subsequent imperfect reassembly by DNA repair pathways or aberrant DNA replication mechanisms. Chromothripsis occurs early in tumour development and leads to cellular transformation by loss of tumour suppressors and oncogene amplifications. In 2015, it was found that chromothripsis can also be curative: a woman who had WHIM (warts, hypogammaglobulinemia, infections, and myelokathexis) syndrome, an extremely rare autosomal dominant combined immunodeficiency disease, found her symptoms disappeared during her 30s after chromothripsis of chromosome 2 deleted the disease allele.

The term chromothripsis is a neologism coined by scientists at the Wellcome Trust Sanger Institute that comes from the Greek words χρῶμα, khrôma 'color' (representing chromosomes because they are strongly stained by particular dyes), and θρίψις, thrípsis 'shattering into pieces'.

== First observation ==
Chromothripsis was first observed in sequencing the genome of a chronic lymphocytic leukaemia. Through paired end sequencing, 55 chromosomal rearrangements were found in the long arm of chromosome 8 and a significant number of rearrangements were found in regions of chromosomes 7, 12, and 15. Subsequent investigations using genome-wide paired-end sequencing and SNP array analysis have found similar patterns of chromothripsis in various human cancers, e.g., melanomas, sarcomas and colorectal, lung and thyroid cancers. In subsequent investigations, about 25% of studied bone cancers displayed evidence of chromothripsis. Chromothripsis has been linked to the generation of oncogenic fusions in supratentorial ependymoma, chondromyxoid fibroma, and Ewing sarcoma, the latter two being bone tumours. Chromothripsis has been seen in 2–3% of cancers across all subtypes.

== Characteristic features ==
- Large numbers of complex rearrangements in localised regions of single chromosomes or chromosome arms (showed by high density and clustered breakpoints) which suggests that chromosomes need to be condensed e.g. in mitosis for chromothripsis to occur.
- Low copy number states- alternation between 2 states (sometimes 3) suggesting that rearrangements occurred in a short period of time.
- In chromothriptic areas, an alternation of regions which retain heterozygosity-two copy (no loss or gain), with regions that have loss of heterozygosity- one copy (heterozygous deletion). This suggests that the rearrangements took place at a time that both parental copies of the chromosome were present and hence early in the development of the cancer cell. This also supports the fact that chromothripsis occurs as one catastrophic event in the cell's history, since once heterozygosity is lost it generally can't be regained; hence the two copy heterozygous state occurring in patches throughout the chromothriptic region is hard to explain.
- Several additional criteria for the inference of chromothripsis events have been described: clustering of chromosomal breakpoints; prevalence of rearrangements affecting a single haplotype; randomness of fragment joins (that is, an approximately equal distribution of tail-to-head, head-to-tail, head-to-head and tail-to-tail segmental connections occurring in conjunction with chromothripsis); and randomness of DNA fragment order along resultant derivative chromosome. Furthermore, if all DNA rearrangements in a region with chromothripsis are detectable, the relative order in which segments are joined can be reconstructed and chromothripsis events identified through "derivative chromosome walks".

== Breakage and repair of chromosomes ==
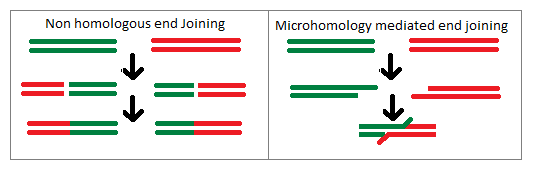
Non homologous end joining and Microhomology mediated end joining

The most widely accepted and straightforward model for chromothripsis is that within a single chromosome, distinct chromosomal regions become fragmented/shattered almost simultaneously and subsequently rejoined in an incorrect orientation. Deletion of certain fragments, including deletions that are a few hundred base pairs long, and hence gene segments is possible and consequently the production of double minute chromosomes. When multiple chromosomes are involved in chromothripsis, fragments of both chromosomes are joined together by paired end joining and the exchange of fragments between the original chromosomes.

Rejoining of fragments require very minimal or even no sequence homology and consequently suggesting that nonhomologous or microhomologous repair mechanisms such as non-homologous end joining (NHEJ) and microhomology-mediated break induced repair (MMBIR) dominate double stranded break repair and are involved in modelling the chromothriptic landscape, opposed to homologous recombination which requires sequence homology. Joining of fragments and rearrangements have also been shown to take place on paternal chromosomes.

As well as in cancer cells, chromothripsis has also been reported in patients with developmental and congenital defects, i.e. germ line cells. Using multiple molecular techniques of these germ line cells that have appeared to have undergone a chromothripsis like process, as well as inversions and translocations, duplications and triplications were also seen and hence increases in copy number. This can be attributed to replicative processes that involve the restoration of collapsed replication forks such as fork stalling and template switching model (FoSTeS) or microhomology mediated break induced replication (MMBIR). This makes it seem that it would be more appropriate to name the phenomenon 'chromoanasynthesis' which means chromosome reconstitution rather than chromothripsis. However most samples displaying chromothripsis that are analysed have low copy states and hence have paired end joining predominating repair mechanisms.

Further study of chromothripsis events and chromothriptic samples is required in order to understand the relative importance of paired end joining and replicative repair in chromothripsis.

== Mechanism ==
One of the main characteristic features of chromothripsis is large numbers of complex rearrangements occurring in localised regions of single chromosomes. The ability to cause such confined damage suggests that chromosomes need to be condensed e.g. in mitosis, for chromothripsis and chromosome rearrangements to be initiated.

The mechanisms of chromothripsis are not well understood. There are multiple ideas of how chromothripsis occurs.

=== Micronuclei model ===
Schematic of Micronucleus model of chromothripsis

The Micronuclei model is the most accepted model as to how and when the breakage and repair in chromothripsis occurs. In cancer cells, fragmentation of chromosomes has been correlated with the presence of micronuclei. Micronuclei are structures formed by mitotic errors in the transition from metaphase to anaphase. Cells with defective chromosome segregation will form micronuclei which contain whole chromosomes or fragments of chromosomes. The segregation of single chromosomes into individual micronuclei explains why DNA fragmentation is isolated to single chromosomes in chromothripsis.

These micronuclei undergo defective DNA replication, which is slower than DNA replication in the main nucleus and causes a proximal DNA damage response (DDR) to be initiated. However, DNA repair and cell cycle checkpoint activation fail to follow. Consequently, chromosomes that are not correctly replicated in micronuclei become fragmented. The mechanism by which the pulverization of these chromosomes occurs is not fully understood, but it is thought to be caused either by aberrant DNA replication or by premature chromosome condensation, which entails semi-replicated chromosomes being compacted by cyclin-dependent kinase activity. The resulting fragmented chromosome segments can be joined together to give rise to a rearranged chromosome, which can subsequently be reincorporated into the main nucleus of a daughter cell. The new chromosome can persist for several generations of cell cycle divisions and contribute to the development of a cancer cell.

Although the micronucleus model is appropriate, other factors are likely to contribute towards chromothripsis for various cancer genomes.

=== Ionising radiation during mitosis ===
Chromosome shattering is triggered and reassembly of chromosome fragments in close proximity is caused by environmental stimuli such as high energy ionising radiation encountered during mitosis.

=== Aborted apoptosis ===
Stress stimuli such as radiation, nutrient deprivation or oxygen deprivation which causes apoptosis will lead to fragmentation of chromatin and cause most cells to apoptose. However a small subset of cells will survive apoptosis. This cleaved DNA will require repair, and when this is done incorrectly, rearrangements will be introduced into the chromosome. There is currently speculation that chromothripsis might be driven by viruses such as γ-herpes viruses which cause cancer, possibly by the inhibition of apoptosis. However this speculation requires further investigation.

=== Telomeric dysfunction ===
Telomeric double stranded breaks or telomeric dysfunction is generated by exogenous agents or replicative stress. Telomeric dysfunctions are known to promote chromosomal abnormalities associated with cancer cells. For example, Telomeric double stranded breaks/ telomeric dysfunctions can cause sister chromatid/ end to end fusion and the formation of anaphase bridges resulting in dicentric chromosomes that can result in further rearrangements. This is a more plausible explanation as chromothripsis has been seen to mostly involve telomeric regions.

== Predispositions ==
Mutations in the TP53 gene can predispose a cell to chromothripsis.

Through genome sequencing of a Sonic hedgehog medulloblastoma (SHH-MB) brain tumour, a significant link between TP53 mutations and chromothripsis in SHH-MBs has been found. Further studies on the association between TP53 and chromothripsis has signified a role for p53, a tumour suppressor protein, in the massive genomic rearrangement which take place in chromothripsis. Hence there is a strong association between p53 status and chromothripsis, giving an insight into why some cancers are more aggressive.

It has also been shown that TP53 mutation-containing cells show a preference for low-fidelity repair mechanisms such as non-homologous end joining. TP53 mutations have also been expressed in cells that exhibit shorter and are more end-end fusion prone. It is also hypothesized that TP53 mutations may be implicated in premature chromosome condensation. TP53 may also contribute to the ability of cells to survive the catastrophic event that normally would be considered to be too destructive to withstand.

== Relationship to carcinogenesis ==
Chromothripsis has been seen to cause oncogene amplification, amplification of oncogene containing regions and the loss of tumour suppressors.

Chromosome segregation errors can lead to DNA damage and chromosomal aberrations such as aneuploidy which is linked to tumour development. The formation of micronuclei generally occurs concurrently with aneuploidy and aneuploidy cells are controlled by mechanisms involving p53. In order for micronuclei to progress through the cell cycle and induce chromosome damage, diminished levels of p53 have been seen to be needed. Through further investigation, chromothriptic tumours have been seen to occur in patients with p53 mutations.

Defects in DNA damage response can cause increased frequency of micronucleus formation and hence the occurrence of chromothripsis. There are numerous examples of how DDR pathways affect chromothripsis and hence cause tumour development and cancers.

- Bloom's syndrome: Mutations in BLM gene which encodes a family of RecQ DNA Helicases cause accumulation of micronuclei that give rise to Bloom's syndrome which predisposes patients to cancer.
- Fanconi anaemia: Fanconi anaemia is a disorder that predisposes patients to cancer due to its effect on DNA repair pathways. Mutations in FANCM gene cause increased micronucleus formation and hence extreme chromothripsis.

As well as cells encompassing DDR defects, they are likely to have repressed apoptotic mechanisms which will further enhance the occurrence of mutations and aneuploidy.

== Prognostics and diagnostics ==
Research in patients with chromothripsis-associated cancers may provide some information about prognosis. TP53 mutations and chromothripsis have been linked in SHH medulloblastoma patients. Poor clinical outcomes in neuroblastomas (such as those caused by deletion of the FANC gene in Fanconi anaemia) have been linked to frequent chromothripsis occurrence. Screening biopsy materials for chromothripsis can lead to good prognosis estimates and better outcomes for patients.

== Criticism ==
It was pointed out that initial computational simulations underpinning the single-event nature of chromothripsis, which are central to the theory, did not necessarily prove the existence of a single event, and that known models of progressive cancer development do not contradict the occurrence of complex rearrangements. It has also been suggested that there is no single traumatic event, but that repeated breakage-fusion-bridge cycles might cause the complex genetic patterns.

== Experimental evidence for chromothripsis ==
In 2015, several research groups presented experimental evidence that chromothripsis is indeed caused by a single catastrophic event. Using a combination of live cell imaging and single-cell genome sequencing of manually isolated cells, it was shown that micronucleus formation can generate a spectrum of genomic rearrangements, some of which recapitulate all known features of chromothripsis. Additionally, research studies inducing telomere crises followed by sequencing the resultant clones demonstrated complex DNA rearrangements that directly recapitulated the one-off chromosomal catastrophe model of chromothripsis.

== See also ==
- Carcinogenesis
- Chromoplexy
- Kataegis
