= Synthetic exosome =

Vesicles engineered for medical purposes

Exosomes are small vesicles secreted by cells that play a crucial role in intercellular communication. They contain a variety of biomolecules, including proteins, nucleic acids and lipids, which can be transferred between cells to modulate cellular processes. Exosomes have been increasingly acknowledged as promising therapeutic tool and delivery platforms due to unique biological properties.

1. Biocompatibility: Exosomes are naturally occurring particles in body, which makes them highly biocompatible and less likely to activate immune response.
2. Targeting ability: Exosomes are assembled to express specific proteins or peptides, allowing them to target specific cells or tissues.
3. Natural cargo carries: Exosomes can naturally transport a variety of biomolecules, including proteins, RNA and DNA, which can be used for therapeutic purposes.

However, due to exosomes being small in size (30-150 nm), present in various biological fluids (such as blood, urine, saliva), sensitivity to environmental factors (such temperature, pH), complexity of drug loading efficiency, there are challenges associated with isolation, purification, delivery and drug payload.

While application of exosomes is still in its early stages, approaches are being explored to produce exosome-like nanovesicles (ELNs or artificial exosomes) to overcome these challenges.

ELNs are a type of engineered exosomes designed to modify the structure and enhance the function of natural exosomes. The content of ELNs can be highly-customized to match with various medical needs, allowing for more precise control over their properties compared to natural exosomes. Additionally, ELNs can be modified with selectively expressed functional groups on the surface to enhance its targeting and uptake by cells or tissues. For example, ELNs can be engineered to enhance their stability in fluids, to target specific cell types, such as cytosol or brain cells. Further, ELNs could consistently deliver cargo mRNA with therapeutic catalase mRNA to the brain, attenuating neurotoxicity and neuroinflammation.

Above all, ELNs' properties can be tailored by researchers for specific applications with precise controlling. ELNs hold significant potential as a novel approach to meet medical needs, including immunologic therapy, anti-tumor, anti-aging and regeneration.
