= Premature chromosome condensation =

Premature mitosis

The hierarchical folding model of chromosome condensation

Premature chromosome condensation (PCC), also known as premature mitosis, occurs in eukaryotic organisms when mitotic cells fuse with interphase cells. Chromatin, a substance that contains genetic material such as DNA, is normally found in a loose bundle inside a cell's nucleus. During the prophase of mitosis, the chromatin in a cell compacts to form condensed chromosomes; this condensation is required in order for the cell to divide properly. While mitotic cells have condensed chromosomes, interphase cells do not. PCC results when an interphase cell fuses with a mitotic cell, causing the interphase cell to produce condensed chromosomes prematurely.

The appearance of a prematurely condensed chromosome depends on the stage that the interphase cell was in. Chromosomes that are condensed during the G_{1} phase are usually long and have a single strand, while chromosomes condensed during the S phase appear crushed. Condensation during the G_{2} phase yields long chromosomes with two chromatids.

PCC was first reported in 1968, of viral-infected cells showing strange appearance of chromosomes. It was found that the strange appearance was selectively observed in S-phase nuclei, and therefore concluded that the nuclei of cells fused in mitotic cells condensed prematurely by unknown material which accumulated in mitotic cells, and observed chromosome structures that are equivalent to those in cell fusion. This material was named as the mitosis promoting factor (MPF).

The precise mechanism of chromosome condensation, as well as the premature condensation, is still in question. It is only known that the enzyme MPF induces PCC in somatic cells or oocytes, as they play a key role in cell cycle regulation and cell growth control. When the interphase nuclei is exposed to activated MPF, which is supplied from the mitotic nuclei, PCC is induced.
