= Extrachromosomal rDNA circle =

Extrachromosomal rDNA circles (a.k.a. ERC) are pieces of extrachromosomal circular DNA (eccDNA) derived from ribosomal DNA (rDNA). Initially found in baker's yeast, these self-replicating circles are suggested to contribute to their aging and found in their aged cells. Like ordinary eccDNA, they are created by intra-molecular homologous recombination of the chromosome. The process for intra-molecular homologous recombination is independent of chromosomal replication. The de novo generated circles had exact multiples of tandem copies of 2-kb fragments from cosmid templates. The tandem organization is essential to circle formation. Looping out of organized ribosomal genes in intergenic nontranscribed spacers yielded either large or small repeat circles dependent on large or short repeats of the spacer.

== In yeast strains ==
The Sgs1 gene mutations in yeast mother cells were shown to have accelerated aging, suggesting their function to cellular senescence. ERCs accumulate in old cells and mutations of Sgs1 were found to increase this accumulation, leading to the idea that ERCs lead to shorter lifespan of cells. Vice versa, deletion of Fob1 slows down ERC accumulation and increases lifespan. Accumulated ERCs impair cell proliferation in old cells by interfering with the expression of important cell cycle genes at the G1/S transition and thus delay cell cycle progression. The ERC accumulate in the mother cell during the budding process. Sinclair et al. mentioned a suggested common mechanism between the Sgs1 and WRN genes since they both had age related effects on yeast and human aging respectively.

Borghouts et al., resolved the two mechanisms, retrograde response and the increase in cellular content of ERCs, that affected longevity in yeast. They determined that the generation of ERCs negatively influence the life spans of grande (cells with fully functional mitochondria) and petite (cells with dysfunctional mitochondria) yeast strains.

== In Xenopus laevis ==
Circular extrachromosomal DNA are not only found in yeast but other eukaryotic organisms. A regulated formation of eccDNA in preblastua Xenopus embryos has been developed. The population of circular rDNA is decreased in embryos, indicative of the circular rDNA migrating to linear DNA, as was shown in their analysis on 2D gel electrophoresis. The decrease in circular rDNA and the degradation of the amplified rDNA population in early embryo development indicated that the small circular molecules are homologous to the rDNA gene cluster, meaning that an abundance of rDNA sequences are not prone to generating circular chromosomes from random events like breakage of ligation.

== In retrograde response ==
Retrograde response or (regulation) is the general term for mitochondrial signaling and broadly defined as the cellular responses to changes in the functional state of the mitochondria. Poole et al. provided a model that resolves the role of retrograde response in lifespan. They depict a process in which ERC production occurs and shortens lifespan in the TAR1 gene.

== See also ==
- Senescence and Gene Regulation
- Extrachromosomal DNA
