= Chromoplexy =

Chromoplexy refers to a class of complex DNA rearrangement observed in the genomes of cancer cells. This phenomenon was first identified in prostate cancer by whole genome sequencing of prostate tumors. Chromoplexy causes genetic material from one or more chromosomes to become scrambled as multiple strands of DNA are broken and ligated to each other in a new configuration. In prostate cancer, chromoplexy may cause multiple oncogenic events within a single cell cycle, providing a proliferative advantage to a (pre-)cancerous cell. Several oncogenic mutations in prostate cancer occur through chromoplexy, such as disruption of the tumor suppressor gene PTEN or creation of the TMPRSS2-ERG fusion gene.

Chromplexy was originally inferred by statistically analyzing the location of DNA breaks across the genome. Its prevalence across cancers is not known, because only a few types of tumors have been analyzed for chromoplexy in the published literature. However, it was detected in the majority of 57 prostate tumors analyzed, and has been reported in non-small cell lung cancers, melanoma and head and neck cancers. It has also been reported to generate the canonical gene fusion, EWSR1-FLI1 and EWSR1-ERG, in Ewing sarcoma.

Along with chromothripsis, and break-fusion-bridge cycles, chromoplexy is an example of chromoanagenesis, a catch-all term for events that generate complex structural chromosomal abnormalities.

== Proposed mechanism ==
The mechanism underlying complex rearrangements in chromoplexy has not been identified. A proposed model is that DNA is brought together in nuclear transcription hubs where genes across multiple chromosomes are co-regulated by transcription factors such as the Androgen receptor. This DNA may then sustain multiple transient breaks during transcription and sets of broken DNA ends may be ligated to one another in an incorrect configuration.

This model has not been demonstrated experimentally. Its merit is that it may account for the fact that chromoplexy appears to cause DNA breaks in regions of the nucleus that are actively transcribed and correspond to open chromatin. It also may explain how DNA from multiple chromosomes may be involved in a single complex rearrangement due to the nuclear co-localization of genes from multiple chromosomes at transcription hubs.

== Relation to chromothripsis ==
Chromoplexy is similar to, but distinct from chromothripsis, a phenomenon whereby a single catastrophic event causes “shattering” of a chromosome. The precise delineation between chromothripsis and chromoplexy is unclear, however general distinctions are

1. Chromoplexy often involve segments of DNA from multiple chromosomes (e.g., five or more), while chromothripsis usually involves clustered regions of one or two chromosomes.
2. A single instance of chromoplexy often involves fewer rearrangements than the hundreds described in chromothripsis.
3. In prostate cancers containing ETS+gene fusions (such as TMPRSS2-ERG), chromoplexy breakpoints are generally clustered within actively transcribed DNA and open chromatin.
4. While chromothripsis is often associated with loss of DNA (“deletions”), regions of lost DNA may be smaller and less common in chromoplexy. However, “deletion bridges” may be seen in chromoplexy that represent lost DNA at the fusion junctions of rearrangements.
5. In at least some instances of prostate cancer, chromoplexy can occur in multiple subsequent rounds. In contrast, multiple independent chromothripsis events have not been identified in single tumors.

== Relation to cancer evolution ==
Chromoplexy has been proposed as a means by which cancer genomes may undergo bursts of evolution by altering multiple cancer genes across the genome in a single “hit”. For example, in at least one prostate tumor, a single chromoplectic event generated the TMPRSS2-ERG fusion while inactivating other tumor suppressor genes such as SMAD4.
